= List of compositions by John Cage =

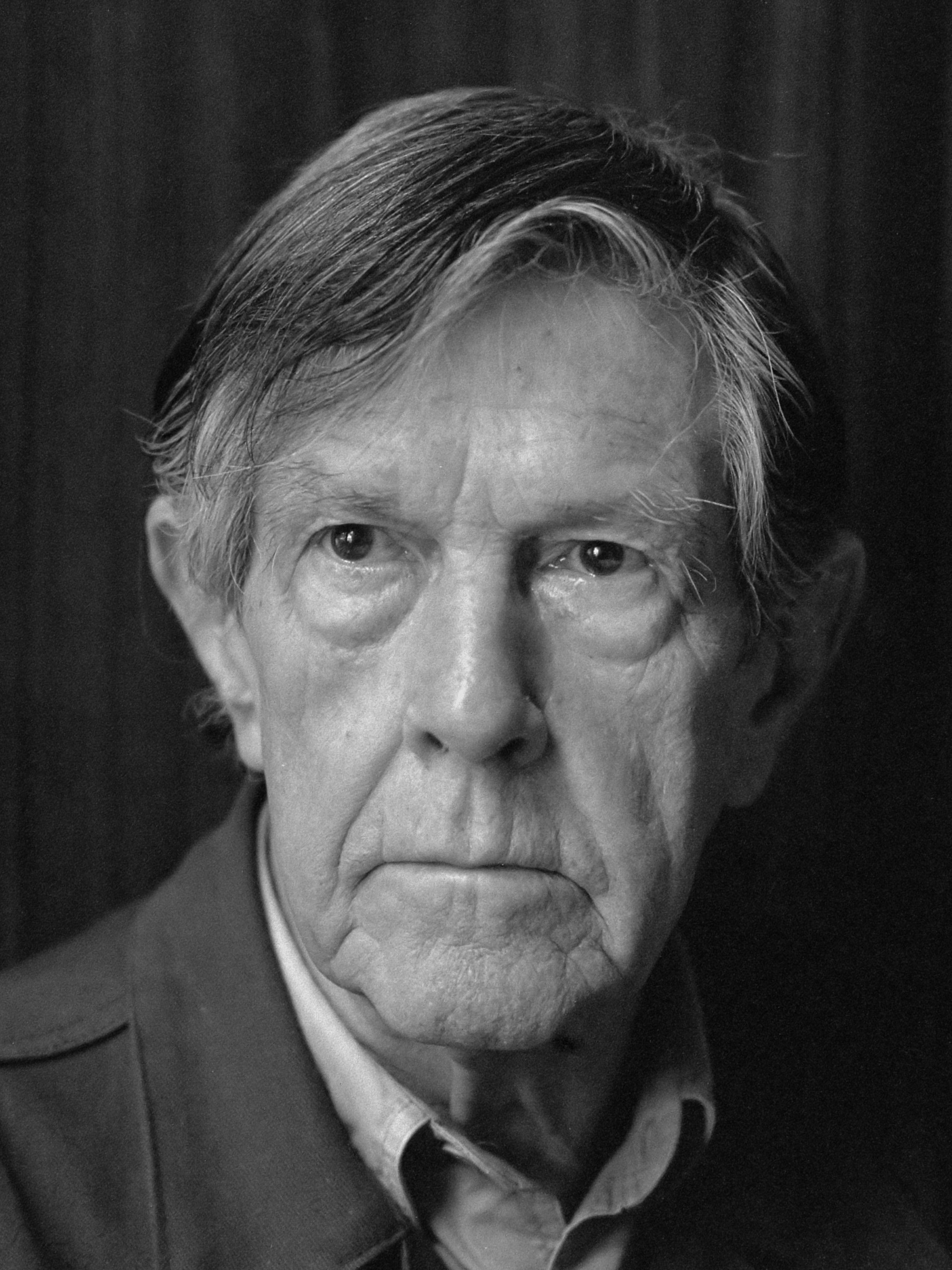
John Cage (1988)

This is a list of compositions by John Cage (1912–1992), arranged in chronological order by year of composition.

== List of works ==
=== Apprenticeship period (1932–1936) ===
- Greek Ode, for voice and piano (1932)
- First Chapter of Ecclesiastes (The Preacher), for voice and piano (1932, possibly incomplete)
- Three Easy Pieces (1. Round in A minor, 2. Duo in G major, 3. Infinite canon in F minor), for piano (1933)
- Three Songs for voice and piano, (1932–33)
- Sonata for Clarinet (1933)
- Sonata for Two Voices, for two instruments with specified ranges (1933)
- Composition for 3 Voices for three unspecified instruments (1934)
- Solo with obbligato accompaniment of two voices in canon, and six short inventions on the subjects of the solo, for three or more instruments (1934, six inventions revised [orchestrated] 1958)
- Three pieces, for two flutes (1935)
- Quartet, for any four percussion instruments (1935)
- Two pieces, for piano (1935?, revised 1974)
- Trio, for three percussionists (1936)

=== Modern dance, prepared piano, and the transition to chance (1937–1951) ===
- Metamorphosis, for piano (1938)
- Five Songs, for contralto soloist and piano (1938)
- Music for Wind Instruments, for wind quintet (1938)
- Bacchanale, for prepared piano (1938)
- Imaginary Landscape No. 1, for two variable-speed phono turntables, frequency recordings, muted piano and cymbal (1939)
- First Construction (in Metal), for six percussionists and an assistant (1939)
- Second Construction, for four percussionists (1940)
- Third Construction, for four percussionists (1941)
- Dance to the West, for piano (1942)
- Forever and Sunsmell, for voice and two percussionists (1942)
- Totem Ancestor, for prepared piano (1942)
- Jazz Study, for piano (1942, spurious work possibly not by Cage)
- Imaginary Landscape No. 3, for six percussionists (1942)
- Imaginary Landscape No. 2 (March No. 1) (1942, first title Fourth Construction)
- The City Wears a Slouch Hat, for narrator and six percussionists (1942)
- Credo in Us, for four performers with various objects (1942)
- And The Earth Shall Bear Again, for prepared piano (1942)
- The Wonderful Widow of Eighteen Springs, for voice and closed piano (1942)
- Primitive, for prepared piano (1942)
- In the Name of the Holocaust, for prepared piano (1942)
- Ad lib, for piano (1943)
- Our Spring Will Come, for prepared piano (1943)
- A Room, for piano or prepared piano (1943, originally third part of She is Asleep)
- She Is Asleep: 1. Quartet for percussion, 2. Duet for voice and prepared piano (1943)
- Amores, for percussion and prepared piano (1943)
- Four Dances (What So Proudly We Hail), for voice and prepared piano (1943)
- Tossed As It Is Untroubled, for prepared piano (1943, first title Meditation)
- Triple-Paced No. 1, for piano (1943)
- Four Walls, for piano and voice (in one of the movements) (1944)
- Prelude for Meditation, for prepared piano (1944)
- Root of an Unfocus, for prepared piano (1944)
- Spontaneous Earth, for prepared piano (1944)
- The Unavailable Memory of, for prepared piano (1944)
- Triple-Paced No. 2, for prepared piano (1944)
- The Perilous Night, suite for prepared piano (1944)
- A Valentine Out of Season, for prepared piano (1944)
- A Book of Music, for two prepared pianos (1944)
- Crete, for piano (1944–45)
- Dad, for piano (1944–45)
- Mysterious Adventure, for prepared piano (1945)
- Soliloquy, for piano (1945, originally part of Four Walls)
- Experiences No. 1, for two pianos 4 hands (1945)
- Three Dances for two prepared pianos (1945)
- Daughters of the Lonesome Isle, for prepared piano (1945)
- Ophelia, for piano (1945)
- Prelude for six instruments in A minor for flute, bassoon, trumpet, violin, cello and piano (1946, an arrangement of the second piece from Two Pieces for piano of 1946)
- Two Pieces, for piano (1946)
- Music for Marcel Duchamp, for prepared piano (1947)
- Nocturne, for violin and piano (1947)
- Ballet The Seasons, versions for piano and for orchestra (1947)
- Dream, for piano or viola and ensemble of 4 violas (1948)
- Experiences No. 2 for voice (1948)
- In a Landscape for piano or harp (1948)
- Sonatas and Interludes, for prepared piano (1946–48)
- Suite for Toy Piano, for toy piano or piano (1948)
- A Flower, for voice and closed piano (1950)
- Works of Calder, film score for prepared piano and tape (1950)
- String Quartet in Four Parts, for string quartet (1949–50)
- Six Melodies, for violin and keyboard instrument (1950)
- Concerto for prepared piano, for prepared piano and chamber orchestra (1950–51)
- Haiku [5], for piano (1950–51)

=== First chance works (1951–1959) ===
- Sixteen Dances for flute, trumpet, 4 percussionists, piano, violin and cello (October 1950 – January 1951)
- Imaginary Landscape No. 4 (March No. 2), for 12 radios, 24 performers and a conductor (April 1951)
- Music of Changes, for piano (May – December 1951)
- Seven Haiku, for piano (July 1951 – 1952)
- Waiting, for piano (January 7, 1952)
- Imaginary Landscape No. 5 for any 42 recordings (January 12, 1952)
- Two Pastorales, for piano or prepared piano (January 31, 1952)
- Water Music for pianist using various objects (Spring 1952)
- For M.C. and D.T., for piano (1952, before August)
- Music for Carillon No. 1, for carillon (July 10, 1952; 2- and 3-octave transcriptions made in 1958 and 1961, respectively)
- 4′33″ for any instrument or combination of instruments (August 1952)
- Music for Piano 1, for piano (December 1952)
- Williams Mix, for tape (1952–53, finished on January 16, 1953)
- Music for Piano 2, for piano (May 1953)
- Music for Piano 4–19, for any number of pianos (May 1953)
- Music for Piano 3, for piano (June 1953)
- 59½" For a String Player, for any 4-string instrument (July 2, 1953)
- Music for Piano 20, for piano (August 20, 1953)
- Music for Carillon No. 2, for carillon (January 1954; 2-octave version made in January 1961)
- Music for Carillon No. 3, for carillon (January 1954; 2-octave version made in January 1961)
- 34'46.776" For a Pianist, for prepared piano (1954, before October 17)
- 31'57.9864" For a Pianist, for prepared piano (1954, before October 17)
- 45' for a Speaker (1954)
- 26'1.1499" For a String Player, for string instrument (1953–55, finished in August – September 1955)
- Music for Piano 21–36, 37–52, for piano solo or in an ensemble (1955, finished on October 11)
- Speech 1955, for news reader and 5 radios (November 1955)
- 27'10.554" For a Percussionist, for percussion (January 14, 1956)
- Music for Piano 53–68, for piano solo or in an ensemble (May 1956)
- Music for Piano 69–84, for piano solo or in an ensemble (May 1956)
- Radio Music, for 1 to 8 performers using radios (May 1956)
- Winter Music, for piano (January 1957)
- For Paul Taylor and Anita Dencks, for piano (September 1957)
- Haiku, for any instruments or objects (January 1958)
- Variations I, for any number of performers and any kind and number of instruments (January 20, 1958)
- Concert for piano and orchestra (1957–58, finished before May 15)
- Solo for Voice 1, for voice (1958, before May 25)
- Music Walk, for piano and various objects (September 24, 1958)
- TV Köln, for piano, optionally with other objects (October 1958)
- Fontana Mix, for tape (November 1958)
- Aria, for voice (November or December 1958)

=== Happenings, theater (1959–1968) ===
- Sounds of Venice, for television set (one performer) (1959)
- Water Walk, a work for a TV show for one performer with a variety of objects (1959)
- Cartridge Music, for amplified sounds (1960)
- Music for Amplified Toy Pianos, for any number of toy pianos (1960)
- Music for "The Marrying Maiden" (music for a play), for tape (1960)
- Solo for Voice 2, for solo voice or chorus (1960)
- Theatre Piece, for 1 to 8 performers (1960)
- WBAI (1960) – auxiliary score for performance with other works
- Where Are We Going? And What Are We Doing?, composed lecture, tapes (1960–61)
- Atlas Eclipticalis for an ensemble of 86 instruments (1961–62)
- Music for Carillon No. 4, for electronic instrument with accompaniment (1961)
- Variations II, for any number of performers and any kind and number of instruments (1961)
- Music for Piano 85, for piano and electronics (1962)
- Variations III, for any number of people performing any actions (1962)
- 0′00″ (4′33″ No. 2), solo for any performer with maximum amplification (no feedback) (1962)
- Variations IV for any number of performers, any sounds or combinations of sounds produced by any means, with or without other activities (1963)
- Electronic Music for Piano, for solo piano (or any number of pianos) with electronics (1964)
- Rozart Mix, tape loops (1965)
- Variations V (1965)
- Variations VI, for a plurality of sound systems (1966)
- Music for Carillon No. 5, for a four-octave instrument (1967)
- Variations VIII, no music or recordings (May 1967; revised 1978)
- Assemblage, for electronics (1968)

=== Return to composition (1969–1986) ===
- HPSCHD, for 1 to 7 amplified harpsichords and 1 to 51 tapes (1967–69, accompanied with Program (KNOBS) for the listener, an instruction for playing back the recording of the piece)
- Cheap Imitation, for piano (1969; orchestrated 1972, violin version 1977)
- Sound Anonymously Received, for an unsolicited instrument (1969, possibly 1978)
- Untitled (Work for Antoinette Vischer), for harpsichord (before 1969)
- Dialog, for two performers with various objects (1970, possibly 1977; also known as Dialogue)
- Song Books (Solos for Voice 3–92), for one or more voices (August – October 1970, Solo for Voice 85 arranged for violin as Chorals in 1978)
- Mureau, for one or more speakers and tape ad lib (November 1970)
- WGBH-TV, for composer and technicians (1971)
- Bird Cage, for 12 tapes (April 1972)
- Etcetera, for small orchestra, tape and, optionally, 3 conductors (August 1973)
- Exercise, for an orchestra of soloists (November 1973, based on Etcetera; second version completed in December 1984)
- Etudes Australes, for piano (1974–75, finished in December)
- Score (40 Drawings by Thoreau) and 23 Parts, for 23 performers; any instruments and/or voices (August 1974)
- Child of Tree (Improvisation I), for percussion made of plants and/or plants used as percussion (1975, before March 8)
- Lecture on the Weather, lecture for 12 voices and tapes (September 1975)
- Renga, 78 parts for any instruments and/or voices (1975–76, finished in April)
- Quartets I–VIII, for orchestra (1976, after August. Three versions for 24, 41, and 93 performers. Arranged for 12 amplified voices and concert band in 1978)
- Branches, for percussion made of plants or plants used as percussion (1976)
- Telephones and Birds, for three performers (1977, before January 18)
- 49 Waltzes for the Five Boroughs, for performer(s), or listener(s), or record maker(s) (1977, before October 6)
- Freeman Etudes, for violin (1977–80, 1989–90)
- Inlets (Improvisation II), for four performers with conch shells and the sound of fire (September 1977)
- Cassette for five performers with any number of tapes (1977, before December 7. Used in Address, see Happenings)
- Alla ricerca del silenzio perduto (Il Treno), for "prepared train" (December 1977)
- A Dip in the Lake: Ten Quicksteps, Sixty-two Waltzes, and Fifty-six Marches for Chicago and Vicinity, for performer(s) or listener(s) or record maker(s) (1978, before May)
- Some of the "Harmony of Maine", for organist and three assistants (November 12, 1978)
- Etudes Boreales, for cello and/or piano (1978)
- Hymns and Variations, for twelve amplified voices (January 1979)
- Roaratorio, an Irish circus on Finnegans Wake, tape (April – September 1979; a realization of ____,____ ____ circus on ____, a set of instructions on transcribing any book for any ensemble)
- Improvisation III, for four or more cassette players (February 1980)
- Furniture Music Etcetera, for two pianos (April 27, 1980; partly based on Etcetera)
- Litany for the Whale, for two voices (July 1980)
- Thirty Pieces for Five Orchestras, for five orchestras (1981, before November 22)
- Instances of Silence, for any number of cassette players and tapes (1982, before March 16)
- Postcard from Heaven, for 1 to 20 harps (June 1982)
- Improvisation IV (Fielding Sixes), for three cassette players (1982, before June 30)
- Dance/4 Orchestras, for four orchestras (1982, before August 22)
- Fifteen Domestic Minutes, for record players at different radio stations (August 1982)
- An Alphabet, radio play (1982)
- ear for EAR (Antiphonies), for voices (possibly January 20, 1983)
- Ryoanji, for double bass, trombone, oboe, voice, percussion, small orchestra (1983; parts added in 1983–85, and an unfinished cello part survives from 1992)
- R/13 (where R=Ryoanji), for percussionist with thirteen found objects (July 26–28, 1983)
- Souvenir, for organ (September 1983)
- Thirty Pieces for String Quartet, for string quartet (September 1983)
- HMCIEX, tape for radio (1983–84)
- Perpetual Tango, for piano (February 1984)
- Haikai, for flute and zoomoozophone (July 1984)
- Nowth upon Nacht, for voice and piano (July 1984)
- A Collection of Rocks, for choir and orchestra (October 1984)
- Eight Whiskus, for low voice (November 21, 1984; reworked for violin in March 1985)
- Mirakus², for voice (November or December 1984)
- Selkus², (November or December 1984)
- ASLSP, for piano or organ (January 1985)
- Sonnekus², for voice (February 1985)
- The first meeting of the Satie society the socie satiety, for two speakers, one female singer, musicians and/or tapes (January – March 1985)
- But what about the noise of crumpling paper which he used to do in order to paint the series of "Papiers froissés" or tearing up paper to make "Papiers déchirés?" Arp was stimulated by water (sea, lake, and flowing waters like rivers), forests, for percussion ensemble (August 1985)
- Etcetera 2/4 Orchestras, for four orchestras and tape (December 1985)
- Voiceless Essay, for four computer-generated tapes (1985–86)
- Wishing Well, for four speakers (early 1986)
- Hymnkus, for voice and chamber ensemble (1986, probably before May 14)
- Improvisation A+B, for voice, clarinet, trombone, percussion and orchestra (1986, before May 14)
- Rocks, for various electronic devices (May 5, 1986)
- Haikai, for gamelan ensemble (October 1986)

=== Number Pieces and other late works (1987–1992) ===
- Music for ________, seventeen parts with no score, for a variable chamber ensemble (1984–87)
- Essay (Writing through the Essay "On the Duty of Civil Disobedience"), for computer-generated tapes (1987–88)
- Two, for flute and piano (April 1987)
- Organ²/ASLSP, for organ (June 1987)
- One, for piano (December 1987)
- Europeras 1 & 2, for 19 voices and 21 musicians (1987, Europeras include a piece for tape called Truckera, also 1987)
- Five, for any five instruments or voices (January 1988)
- Solos for Voice 93–96 (Four Solos for Voice), for voice(s) (April 1988)
- Seven, for flute, clarinet, percussion, piano, violin, viola and cello (May 1988)
- Twenty-Three, for 13 violins, 5 violas and 5 cellos (1988, before June 21)
- Five Stone Wind, for three performers with clay drums, electronics and unspecified instruments (June – July 1988)
- 1O1, for orchestra (1988, before November 13)
- Four, for string quartet (1989, before May 9)
- One², for 1 to 4 pianos (summer 1989)
- Three, for three recorders (July 1989)
- Two², for two pianos (1989, after July 28)
- One³ = 4′33″ (0′00″) + , for solo performer (late 1989)
- Sculptures Musicales, for electronics (1989, before September 23)
- Sports: Swinging, after Satie, for piano (1989)
- The Beatles 1962–1970, piano and, optionally, tape (1990, possibly 1989)
- c Composed Improvisations, for bass guitar, snare drum and one-sided drums with or without jangles (1987–90)
- One⁴, for solo drummer (1990)
- Fourteen, for piano, flute/piccolo, bass flute, clarinet, bass clarinet, horn, trumpet, 2 percussionists, 2 violins, viola, cello and double bass (1990, before May 12)
- One⁵, for piano (May 1990)
- Europeras 3 & 4, for 6 voices, 2 pianos, 12 victrolas and tape (1990, Europeras include a piece for tape called Truckera, composed 1987)
- One⁶, for violin (June 1990)
- Seven², for bass flute, bass clarinet, bass trombone, two percussionists with unspecified instruments, cello and contrabass (1990, before July 23)
- One⁷, for any sound-producing object (late 1990)
- Scottish Circus, for Scottish folk band of any number of musicians and any instruments/voices (September 1990)
- Four², for SATB choir (October 1990)
- One⁸, for cello (April, 1991)
- 108, for orchestra (April 1991)
- Europera 5, for 2 voices, piano, victrola, tape/TV/radio (1991, before April 12)
- Eight, for flute, oboe, clarinet, bassoon, horn, trumpet, tenor trombone and tuba (1991, before May 14)
- Three² for three percussionists with unspecified instruments (May 1991)
- Four³, for one or two pianos, twelve rainsticks and violin/oscillator, all operated by four performers (May 1991)
- Five², for English horn, 2 clarinets, bass clarinet and timpani (May 1991)
- Lullaby, for musical box (May 1991)
- One⁹, for shō (July 1991)
- Two³, for shō and five conch shells (July 1991)
- Two⁴, for violin and piano or shō (July 1991)
- Six, for six percussionists with unspecified instruments (September 1991)
- 103, for orchestra (September 1991)
- Two⁵, for piano and tenor trombone (October 1991)
- Four⁴, for percussionists with unspecified instruments (October 1991)
- Four⁵, for four saxophones (October 1991)
- Five³, for trombone and string quartet (October 1991)
- Five⁴, for soprano saxophone, alto saxophone and 3 percussionists (October 1991)
- Five⁵, for flute, 2 clarinets, bass clarinet and percussion (October 1991)
- Five Hanau Silence, for tape (October 1991)
- Ten, for flute, oboe, clarinet, trombone, percussion, piano, 2 violins, viola and cello (October – November 1991)
- Twenty-Six, for 26 violins (December 1991)
- Twenty-Eight, for wind ensemble (December 1991)
- Twenty-Nine, for two timpani, two percussionists, piano and strings (December 1991)
- Twenty-Eight, Twenty-Six and Twenty-Nine, for orchestra (December 1991, a combination of Twenty-Six, Twenty-Eight and Twenty-Nine)
- Mozart Mix, for five cassette players (1991)
- One¹⁰, for violin (February 1992)
- Sixty-Eight, for orchestra (February 1992)
- Eighty, for orchestra (February 1992)
- Four⁶, for four performers with any means of producing sounds (March 1992)
- Seventy-Four, for orchestra (March 1992)
- Fifty-Eight, for wind orchestra (March 27, 1992)
- Two⁶, for violin and piano (April 1992)
- Thirteen, for flute, oboe, clarinet in B-flat, bassoon, trumpet in C, tenor trombone, tuba, 2 percussionists, 2 violins, viola and cello (May 14, 1992)
- Muoyce II (Writing through Ulysses), for speaker and tapes (May 1992)
- One¹¹, for solo cinematographer (1992)
- One¹², for solo lecturer (1992, before June 22)

== Happenings ==
- Black Mountain Piece, mixed-media performance (1952, only a fragment survives)
- Variations V, audio-visual performance (1965)
- Variations VII, mixed-media performance (1966)
- Musicircus, mixed-media performance (1967)
- Newport Mix, event with audience-provided tape loops (1967)
- Reunion, event (1968)
- Mewantemooseicday, event (1969)
- 33⅓, installation with record players (1969)
- Demonstration of the Sounds of the Environment, event (1971)
- Les chants de Maldoror pulvérisés par l'assistance même, event (1971)
- Apartment House 1776, mixed-media event (1976)
- Address, mixed-media event (1977)
- Sounday (Toneday), radio event (1978)
- Concerto Grosso, installation (1979)
- Paragraphs of Fresh Air, radio event (1979)
- Silent Environment (1979)
- Evéne/Environne METZment (1981)
- A House Full of Music, for 200 performers from music schools (1982)
- Musicircus for Children (1984, based on A House Full of Music)

== Collaborations ==
- Marriage at the Eiffel Tower, for two pianos and various objects (1939) – with Henry Cowell, George Frederick McKay, Silvestre Revueltas, and Amadeo Roldán
- Double Music, for four percussionists (1941) – with Lou Harrison
- Party Pieces: Sonorous and Exquisite Corpses, for any melodic and/or keyboard instruments (1945) – with Henry Cowell, Lou Harrison and Virgil Thomson
- Music for "Museum Event No. 5", mixed-media performance (1967) – with Toshi Ichiyanagi, Gordon Mumma and David Tudor
- "HPSCHD", for harpsichord and computer-generated sounds (1967–1969) – with Lejaren Hiller
- Vis-à-vis, for two performers (1986) – with Toru Takemitsu

== Arrangements ==
- Arrangement of Socrate (Erik Satie) (1944 or 1947)
- Adaptation of Ixion (Morton Feldman) for chamber ensemble or 2 pianos (1958)
- Collage of some Studies for Player Piano (Conlon Nancarrow) on tape (1964)
- Adaptation of some Studies for Player Piano (Conlon Nancarrow) (1969)

== Unfinished and incomplete works ==
- Quest, for various objects (first movement) and piano (second movement) (1935, only the second movement survives)
- Chess Pieces, for piano (1943)
- Encounter, for piano (1946)
- Unfinished work for voice (1953)
- Unfinished work for magnetic tape (c. 1952–53)
- One¹³, for one live cello and recordings of three cellos (1992)
- Sixteen, for flute, oboe, clarinet, bassoon, horn, trumpet, trombone, bass trombone, piano, 2 percussionists, 2 violins, viola, cello and double bass (1992)

== Lost works ==
This section lists works for which the location of manuscript is unknown, or which possibly were not notated.

- Untitled composition, 1931
- Etudes, for piano (1932, possibly same as the untitled composition of 1931)
- Duet, for two flutes (1934)
- Music for Xenia, for piano (1934)
- Allemande for clarinet (1934)
- String Quartet (1936)
- Music for an Aquatic Ballet (1938)
- 25 Ballets in 1 act for a solo dancer (1939)
- Ho to AA, for voice and piano (1939)
- America was promises, for voice and piano 4 hands (1940)
- Four songs of the moment, for piano (1940)
- Prelude to Flight, for piano? (1940)
- Spiritual, for piano (1940)
- Opening dance, for piano (1942)
- Shimmera, for prepared piano (1942)
- Lidice, for prepared piano (1943)
- The Feast, for piano (1945)
- Thin Cry, for piano (1945)
- Foreboding, for piano (1946)
- Orestes, for piano? (1948)
- Music for Carillon No. 6, dedicated to Morton Feldman (1961)
- First Week of June (1970)
- Untitled (work for Joao Miró), for piano (1970)
- 52/3 (1972)
- Music for "Westbeth", for piano? (1974)
- Pools, for a single performer (1978, based on Inlets)
- Seventeen, (1992, possibly similar to Sixteen or does not exist)
- Otte, for violin (1992, spurious, probably not by Cage or does not exist)

== Literary works ==
- Silence: Lectures and Writings (1961)
- A Year from Monday (1968)
- M (1973)
- Empty Words (1979)
- X (1983)
