= Works for prepared piano by John Cage =

List of prepared piano solos by John Cage

American avant-garde composer John Cage (1912–1992) began composing pieces for solo prepared piano around 1938–40. The majority of early works for this instrument were created to accompany dances by Cage's various collaborators, most frequently Merce Cunningham. In response to frequent criticisms of prepared piano, Cage cited numerous predecessors (such as Henry Cowell). In the liner notes for the very first recording of his most highly acclaimed work for prepared piano, Sonatas and Interludes, Cage wrote: "Composing for the prepared piano is not a criticism of the instrument. I'm only being practical." This article presents a complete list of Cage's works for prepared piano, with comments on each composition. All of Cage's indeterminate works for unspecified forces (the Variations series, Fontana Mix, Cartridge Music, etc.) can also be performed on or with Prepared Piano.

== Solo ==
=== Bacchanale ===
In interviews conducted in 1974 and 1982, Cage specified that this piece was composed in 1938. However, the manuscript used for Edition Peters' edition of Bacchanale specified 1940 as the date, and this has been used by numerous scholars since. The circumstances of the piece's composition are much clearer: it was created for a choreography by the American dancer Syvilla Fort. Cage and Fort were both working at the Cornish School in Seattle, Washington at the time. The room where the dance was to be performed was not large enough to allow for a percussion ensemble, but had enough space for a grand piano. Cage decided to try placing various objects on the strings of the instrument in order to produce percussive sounds, inspired by Henry Cowell's experiments with extended piano techniques. In 1982 Cage mentioned that the whole piece was completed in just three days. Twelve notes are prepared, mostly using weather strippings. In the score, in 11 cases out of 12, the performer is instructed to "determine position and size of mutes by experiment."

=== Totem Ancestor ===
Composed in 1942 for a dance by Merce Cunningham. Eleven notes are prepared, eight of them by screws. This is the only Cage-Cunningham collaboration from the 1940s for which original choreography has survived.

=== And the Earth Shall Bear Again ===
Composed in 1942 for a dance by Valerie Bettis. Ten individual notes are prepared, mostly with small screws, and a whole range from G1 to C3 is prepared using "two thicknesses of woolen material". This material is placed between the strings in the following manner: over the first string, under the second, over the third, under the fourth, etc.

=== Primitive ===
Composed in 1942 for a dance by Wilson Williams. Thirteen notes are prepared, all using screws or bolts.

=== In the Name of the Holocaust ===
Composed in late 1942 for a dance by Merce Cunningham. The title references World War II (like in the lost prepared piano work Lidice (see Lidice) from 1943). Piano preparation involves only screws or bolts. Various extended techniques are used, such as producing sound by plucking strings. The piece starts with quiet, muted tones and gradually becomes louder, climaxing in several successions of large tone clusters, executed using the entire length of the forearm.

=== Our Spring Will Come ===
Composed in 1943 for a dance by Pearl Primus. Piano preparation involves bamboo strips, as well as screws and nuts. The music and the dance were to be accompanied by a speaker reading a poem by Langston Hughes about the condition of Black people in the United States.

=== A Room ===
Composed in 1943, originally conceived as the third part of She Is Asleep (see below). May be performed with or without preparations, which involve 11 notes. Most are to be prepared using bolts, one new material is a penny. The music is written down on a single staff and follows the structure 4, 7, 2, 5, 4, 7, 2, 3, 5 (numbers denote the number of bars dedicated to a particular part of the section), repeated twice.

=== Tossed As It Is Untroubled ===
Composed in 1944 for a dance by Merce Cunningham, and dedicated to Valerie Bettis. Originally titled Meditation. Only eight notes are prepared, mostly with weather strippings. Roughly two thirds of the piece are written down on a single staff; the melodic line which makes up most of the piece uses just five tones, all prepared with weather strippings. The two heavily prepared notes are only used for a trill at the very end of the work.

=== A Valentine Out of Season ===
A suite of three pieces, composed in 1944. Choreographed by Merce Cunningham as Effusions avant l'heure / Games / Trio. The title references Cage's separation from his wife Xenia, which happened in 1945.

=== Prelude for Meditation ===
Composed in 1944. A very short work that only uses four tones.

=== Root of an Unfocus ===
Composed in 1944 for a dance by Merce Cunningham. A work in three sections: Section 1 contains seven parts, seven bars each; Section 2 juxtaposes bars in 4/4 and 3/4 metres; Section 3 divides 100 half notes into three groups of 23 and a coda. According to Cunningham, the subject of the work is fear: it describes "awareness of the unknown, struggle, and the final defeat".

=== Spontaneous Earth ===
Composed in 1944 for a dance by Merce Cunningham.

=== The Unavailable Memory of ===
Composed in 1944 for a dance by Merce Cunningham. Written entirely on a single staff, primarily scored as a single melodic line.

=== Triple-Paced No. 2 ===
This work, composed in 1944, is a revision of a 1943 piano piece titled Triple-Paced. The 1944 version was choreographed by Merce Cunningham.

=== The Perilous Night ===
Composed in 1944. This is Cage's first large-scale work for prepared piano. Twenty-six notes are prepared with various materials. The piece contains six separate sections with different rhythmic structures. According to Cage, The Perilous Night expresses "the loneliness and terror that comes to one when love becomes unhappy". All of the six movements of this work are untitled. 38 years after its composition, his longtime friend artist Jasper Johns included a silkscreen of the score in a large mixed-media diptych which itself is also titled “Perilous Night.”

=== Mysterious Adventure ===
Composed in 1945 for a dance by Merce Cunningham. This is another large-scale work with moderately complex piano preparation, involving 27 notes. It contains five sections.

=== Daughters of the Lonesome Isle ===
Composed in 1945 for a dance by Jean Erdman. Contains nineteen sections. Thirty-nine notes are prepared.

=== Music for Marcel Duchamp ===
Screenshots of the Dreams That Money Can Buy segment Cage wrote music for.

Composed in 1947 for a segment of Hans Richter's surrealist film Dreams That Money Can Buy. The film contains several segments designed by different artists, and Cage's music was composed for a segment designed by Marcel Duchamp. The segment—a dream one of the characters is having—is titled "Discs" and consists mostly of Duchamp's rotoreliefs. These are designs painted on flat cardboard circles, which are to be spun on a phonographic turntable. The work was later choreographed by Merce Cunningham. The global structure is 11x11 (eleven sections of eleven bars each), the rhythmic proportion is 2, 1, 1, 3, 1, 2, 1. Similarly to Tossed As It Is Untroubled and The Unavailable Memory of, the work mostly builds on a single melodic line, which uses notes muted by weather strippings. This piece is one of the first to explore the idea of silence systematically: empty bars are juxtaposed with melodic passages throughout the piece.

=== Sonatas and Interludes ===
Part of the table of preparations of Sonatas and Interludes.

A cycle of 20 short works (16 sonatas and 4 interludes) composed in 1946–48. Dedicated to pianist Maro Ajemian. This is Cage's most famous work for prepared piano, and also the most complex: piano preparation takes about 2–3 hours and involves forty-five notes, and the proportions governing the structure of individual pieces include fractions as well as natural numbers. Sonatas and Interludes was inspired by Cage's interest in Indian philosophy and the Rasa aesthetic as explained in Ananda K. Coomaraswamy's writings. The pieces express the eight "permanent" emotions (the humorous, the wondrous, the erotic, the heroic, anger, fear, disgust and sorrow) and their common tendency toward tranquility.

=== Music for Works of Calder ===
Composed in 1950 for Herbert Matter's short film on sculptor Alexander Calder, Works of Calder. The idea of the film was suggested by Burgess Meredith, whom Calder met in spring 1948. The decision to ask Matter to direct was Calder's: the two had worked with each other previously when Matter made photographs of Calder's works. The 20-minute color film, produced and narrated by Meredith (narration by John Latouche) and photographed and directed by Matter, was completed in 1949, but since Matter insisted on asking Cage to compose the music, the team had to wait for about a year until Cage returned from Europe. The piece consists of three sequences, two of which (numbers 1 and 3) are for prepared piano, and one (number 2) is for tape: Cage recorded the sounds of Calder's studio while the sculptor was working —mobiles bumping into one another, etc.—then edited the resulting two-hour recording in order to produce the desired sequence of sounds.

=== Two Pastorales ===
Composed in November 1951 (first piece) and January 1952 (second piece). Both pastorales use chance operations applied using charts of layers, sounds, durations, etc. and the I Ching, similarly to Music of Changes. Because the number of layers was smaller than in the latter work (specifically, there are just two layers), the texture of Two Pastorales is thinner, with long silences between notes. Like in Music of Changes, the notation is proportional, one inch equals one quarter note. Extended techniques are used: strings are sometimes plucked by fingers or cymbal sticks, or muted by hand.

=== 34'46.776" For a Pianist ===
An excerpt from the score of 34'46.776" For a Pianist.

Composed in 1954, this work is one of the so-called "time length" pieces, in which the title refers to the length of the work. The piece was composed using chance operations and written down in proportional graphic notation. The rhythmic structure is 3, 7, 2, 5, 11. Piano preparation is defined only by specifying the strings to be prepared and the materials to be used, the actual choice of objects and their position on the strings is left to the performer. This piece was composed for David Tudor and is very difficult to play; its companion piece, 31'57.9864" For a Pianist, shares the same techniques but is much easier. Both works may be performed solo or together with other "time length" compositions.

=== 31'57.9864" For a Pianist ===
Composed in 1954. A companion piece to 34'46.776" For a Pianist, it uses similar notation and compositional techniques, but is much easier to play. The rhythmic structure is also identical to 34'46.776".

== Two prepared pianos ==
=== A Book of Music ===
Composed in 1944. Like the later work, Three Dances (1945), A Book of Music was commissioned by pianists Robert Fizdale and Arthur Gold. It was Cage's first work written on request from professional performers. There are two movements, each divided into several smaller sections (four in the first movement, three in the second). The music makes much use of scales and arpeggios and features much virtuosic writing. According to Cage, this was inspired by his ideas on Mozart's music, which "strictly adheres to three different kinds of scales: the chromatic, the diatonic, and that consisting of the larger steps of thirds and fourths". The technique of rhythmic proportions is used in a new way: the proportion for each piece is defined for a particular tempo. A change in the tempo causes a change in the proportion.

=== Three Dances ===
Composed in 1945. This work is similar in style (large-scale virtuosic writing) and technique (rhythmic proportions dependent on the tempo) to A Book of Music and too was commissioned by Fitzdale and Gold.

== Ensemble ==
=== Second Construction ===
Composed in 1939–40. This piece is scored for various percussion instruments and piano. The score instructs the performer to insert a screw and a strip of cardboard between several strings, but the piano part is written essentially for the string piano technique. The rhythmic proportions — 16 groups of 16 bars divided 4, 3, 4, 5 — are defined in the score, but the music doesn't always rely on them.

=== She Is Asleep ===
An unfinished suite of different pieces, composed in 1943. The two completed movements are:

1. Quartet for 12 tom-toms
2. Duet for voice and prepared piano

The piano/prepared piano piece A Room (1943, see above) was intended to be third part of She Is Asleep. This piece is one of the earliest instances of the use of rhythmic proportions to govern the structure of individual movements and/or whole works. The proportion is 4, 7, 2, 5; 4, 7, 2, 3, 5 and it affects only the microstructure of the pieces.

=== Amores ===
Composed in early 1943 after Cage moved to New York City, as a concert piece. Choreographed by Merce Cunningham in 1949. Amores contains four movements:

1. Solo for prepared piano
2. Trio for 9 tom-toms and a pod rattle
3. Trio for 7 wood blocks
4. Solo for prepared piano

Eighteen notes are prepared using 9 screws, 8 bolts, 2 nuts and 3 strips of rubber. Similarly to Bacchanale, the performer is instructed in the score to "determine position and size of mutes by experiment". This was one of Cage's earliest works to use Cage's rhythmic proportions technique. The structure of the second movement, for example, is based 10-bar units each divided into four sections: 3, 2, 2, 3. The proportion 3, 3, 2, 2 is used similarly in the second solo for prepared piano.

=== Four Dances ===
Composed in 1943–44 for a choreography by Hanya Holm. Original title What So Proudly We Hail, also known as Suite of four dances. The four dances are:

1. Dance No. 1 for percussion and piano
2. Dance No. 2 for tenor soloist (wordless) and piano
3. Dance No. 3 for piano
4. Dance No. 4 for tenor soloist (wordless), percussion and piano

=== Concerto for Prepared Piano ===
Composed in 1950–51. The work is scored for a prepared piano and a chamber orchestra and was written using the gamut technique Cage developed in String Quartet in Four Parts (1950). Independently created sonorities (single notes, chords, aggregates) are arranged into rectangular charts; the music is composed by tracing geometric patterns on them. There are three movements. The piano part develops from free composition (movement 1) to following the orchestra using a parallel chart (movement 2) and then to sharing the same chart with the orchestra (movement 3). Piano preparation in the Concerto is rather complex and involves, among other things, a moveable plastic bridge that makes possible microtonal effects.

== Lost works ==
=== Shimmera ===
Composed in late 1942 for a dance by Merce Cunningham.

=== Lidice ===
Composed in 1943 for a dance by Marie Marchowsky. The title refers to Lidice, a Czech village destroyed by German forces in 1942.

== See also ==
- List of compositions by John Cage

== References and further reading ==
- Cage, John. 1973. Silence: Lectures and Writings, Wesleyan Paperback (first edition 1961). ISBN 0-8195-6028-6
- Ishii, Reiko. 2005. The Development of Extended Piano Techniques in Twentieth-Century American Music, pp. 38–41. The Florida State University, College of Music. Available online:
- Kostelanetz, Richard. 1974. John Cage, Allen Lane; University of California, . ISBN 0713907622
- Kostelanetz, Richard. 2003. Conversing with John Cage, Routledge. ISBN 0-415-93792-2
- Nicholls, David (ed.), 2002. The Cambridge Companion to John Cage. Cambridge University Press. ISBN 0-521-78968-0
- Pritchett, James, and Kuhn, Laura. "John Cage", Grove Music Online, ed. L. Macy, grovemusic.com (subscription access).
- Pritchett, James. 1993. The Music of John Cage. Cambridge University Press. ISBN 0-521-56544-8
- Revill, David. 2014. The Roaring Silence: John Cage: A Life (Revised Edition), Skyhorse Publishing, Inc. ISBN 9781628723960
