= M (John Cage book) =

Book by American avant-garde composer John Cage

M: Writings ’67–’72
- Author: John Cage
- Publisher: Wesleyan University Press
- Publication date: 1973
- Pages: 217 pp.
- ISBN: 978-0-8195-4058-4
- OCLC: 520710

M: Writings ’67–’72 is a book of essays by American avant-garde composer John Cage (1912–1992), first published in 1973 by Wesleyan University Press.

M was Cage's third full-length book, after Silence: Lectures and Writings and A Year from Monday. All of the essays in it were written between 1967 and 1972. Charles Hamm, a biographer of Cage, has said "virtually his entire career as composer, poet and visual artist was counterpointed by his own words", including this volume in the middle of his most productive years. Henahan, writing for The New York Times Book Review, contrasted the "uncollectable and unpreservable, gaily but deliberately writ on water" form of his music with "slight chance of outliving him by much" to the solid permanence of his writing, including M. In 1981, Henahan predicted that only Cage's four books of essays, including M and that year's For The Birds, would be remembered in 2001.

== Thoreau's influence on Cage ==
M was Cage's first work after his exposure to Thoreau, considered possibly "a decisive moment in Cage's artistic life" by Thoreau scholar Jannika Bock. Bock also analyses the book's title to be not as Cage said, chosen randomly, but taken from the title of one of Cage's works in the collection, "Mureau", a portmanteau of "music" and "Thoreau". Cage wrote about the importance of the word Mureau in the book's foreword in which he said that it was both one of the more unconventional texts contained in it, and that vocalization of the word itself formed the basis of many of his then-recent musical performances.

Bock further notes that seven out of eleven of the poetic works in M mention Thoreau by name, and she and another scholar counted between 27 and 30 direct or indirect references to Thoreau in the book.

== Contents ==
The book contains the following writings:

- "Foreword" (1973)
- "Diary: How to Improve the World (You Will Only Make Matters Worse)" (continued 1968; revised version)
- "62 Mesostics re Merce Cunningham" (1973, originally a musical composition)
- "36 Mesostics Re and Not Re Marcel Duchamp" (1970, also known as "36 Acrostics re and not re Marcel Duchamp")
- "Mureau" (1971–72)
- "Diary: How to Improve the World (You Will Only Make Matters Worse") (continued 1969)
- "Song" (1973)
- "Six Mesostics":
  - "Present" (1970, also known as an untitled "Poem for Edwin Denby")
  - "On the windshield of a new Fiat for James K. (who had not made up his mind where to go) and Carolyn Brown" (1973)
  - "In Memoriam S.W." (1973)
  - "July 13, 1972" (1972)
  - "For A.C. on his 70th birthday" (1973)
  - "Ten years before sixty-seven" (1967)
- "Diary: How to Improve the World (You Will Only Make Matters Worse)" (continued 1970–71)
- "Mushroom Book" (1972, collaboration with Lois A. Long and Alexander H. Smith)
- "25 Mesostics Re and Not Re Mark Tobey" (1973)
- "Diary: How to Improve the World (You Will Only Make Matters Worse)" (continued 1971–72)
