= Credo in Us =

- by John Cage
- Genre: Experimental, Percussion ensemble, Contemporary dance music
- Style: Satirical, avant-garde
- Form: Dramatic playlet for two characters
- Written: July 1942, revised October 1942

Premiere
- Location: Bennington College, Vermont
- Performers: Merce Cunningham, Jean Erdman, pianist, percussionists, phonograph/radio operator

Credo in Us is a musical composition by the American experimental music composer, writer and visual artist John Cage. It was written in July 1942 and revised in October of that year. In the wake of Pearl Harbor, this piece avoided the populist tendencies of fellow American composers at the time, while the piece's title is thought to be a call to collective unity.

Styled as "a dramatic playlet for Two Characters", Cage described Credo in Us as "a suite with a satirical character". It was composed to accompany a piece of contemporary dance choreographed by his partner and collaborator Merce Cunningham and choreographer Jean Erdman, who performed the piece at its premiere in Bennington College, Vermont on August 1, 1942.

== Instrumentation ==
One of a number of Cage's percussive works, Credo in Us is unusual in using sound samples from recordings of other works, fragments of radio broadcast, popular music, tin cans and tom toms.

The instrumentation for the original performance included four performers: a pianist; two percussionists playing muted gongs, tin cans, electric buzzer and tom-toms; and a fourth performer operating a radio and a phonograph. For the phonograph, Cage suggests using something "classic" such as Dvořák, Beethoven, Sibelius or Shostakovich; and for the radio, to use any station but avoid news programs in the case of a "national emergency". Jean Erdman recalls that for the first performance a 'tack-piano' was used—one of Cage's prepared pianos, though the pianist is also called upon to play the soundbox of the instrument as a percussionist.

== Structure ==
Four tutti “Facades” are separated by three “Progressions.” The Facades feature the use of polyrhythms that create a dense and, especially when the phonograph or radio is sounding, cacophonous sonic landscape. The First Progression, a cowboy song (and the first of two extended piano solos), was a solo for Cunningham. The Second Progression, a solo for Erdman, uses an “Indian” tom-tom rhythm as its background. The Third Progression, a duet for the dancers, is set to an extended “boogie-woogie” piano solo. The work ends in the same manner in which it begins – a solo for the phonograph/radio player.

== Historical Context ==
Looking at Credo in Us though the lens of history, we are able to view Credo as a sort of microcosm of Cage’s output. Many typical Cagean aspects are found in this work: the use of piano and percussion (both standard and found instruments) to accompany a dance; the use of radio and electronic sounds (foreshadowing many later works, including Radio Music and Imaginary Landscape No. 4); and the inclusion of random events (whatever happens to be playing on the radio) are all representative of the Cage aesthetic.

== Recordings ==
- 1971 : Musica Negativa, conducted by Rainer Riehn - Credo in Us (Cortical Foundation 14)
- 1995 : Mainz Percussion Ensemble - Music for Percussion Quartet (Col Legno WWE 1CD 20015)
- 1996 : The Eos Ensemble, conducted by Jonathan Sheffer - Music for Merce (Catalyst BMG 09026-68751-2)
- 2000 : Quatuor Helios - Credo in us...: More Works for Percussion (WERGO WER 6651 2)
- 2001 : Cikada Duo & Tomas Nilsson - Will You Give Me to Tell You (Albedo ALBCD021)
- 2013 : Giancarlo Simonacci & Ars Ludi - Music for Piano and Percussion (Brilliant Classics 94745)

"Credo in US (for 4 percussionists)" at MusicBrainz (information and list of recordings)

== See also ==
- List of compositions by John Cage
