= Music for Piano (Cage) =

Music for Piano is a series of 85 indeterminate musical compositions for piano by American avant-garde composer John Cage. All of these works were composed by making paper imperfections into sounds using various kinds of chance operations.

== General information ==
The use of paper imperfections was suggested by fast techniques in painting. Cage recounts that using the I Ching was always a very slow process. In 1952 a dancer (probably Jo Anne Melcher, the dedicatee of Music for Piano 1) made a request for a piece of music which was needed urgently, and Cage had to find a way to speed up the process:

Certainly I intended to continue working [...] by consulting the I Ching as usual. But I also wanted to have a very rapid manner of writing a piece of music. Painters, for example, work slowly with oil and rapidly with water colors [...] I looked at my paper, and I found my "water colors": suddenly I saw that the music, all the music, was already there.

A description of the process of composing these pieces can be found in Cage's book Silence: Lectures and Writings.

Cage composed the work by creating a "master page" in which two staves (one "system") have enough space above and below to allow each staff to be either treble or bass clef, so that all the notes on the piano can be included. He then used transparent paper and marked the imperfections in the paper according to various chance operations, then inscribing the staves of the master sheet on the page, making the imperfections into whole notes, adding ledger lines (where needed), accidentals, clefs, and other indications (such as M for "muted" and P for "pizzicato") selected using the I Ching.

The Music for Piano series comprises the following works:

Music for Piano 1 (1952)
Dedicated to dancer Jo Anne Melcher, who commissioned the work for her choreography "Paths and Events". The score (six pages) only specifies pitches (using whole notes), leaving the durations to the performer. Cage composed the piece one staff at a time. First, he set up a time interval within which to work. Then he would mark as many paper imperfections as he could find during that time. The piece is played at a prescribed tempo (each system = 7 seconds). In all subsequent pieces the tempo is freely determined by the performer.
Music for Piano 2 (1953)
Composed for dancer Louise Lippold, as were In a Landscape (1948) and A Flower (1950). The pitches are again derived from paper imperfections, but this time a predefined rhythmic controls the density of notes. Chance operations (with the I Ching) are used to determine methods of sound production (on the keyboard, muting [string muted with fingers or hand and played on the keyboard] or plucked.) Tempo and dynamics are left to the performer. The score is four pages long.
Music for Piano 3 (1953)
Dedicated to Morton Feldman. Starting with this piece, all subsequent entries in the series are exactly one page long, and the number of notes and/or sounds is determined by the I Ching chance operations. In this and subsequent pieces dynamics and durations are free.
Music for Piano 4–19 (for any number of pianos) (1953)
Composed for Merce Cunningham's choreography titled Solo Suite in Space and Time. Starting with these sixteen pieces, all subsequent entries in the series may be performed together, either in sequence or simultaneously, by any number of pianists. Overlapping of and silences between pieces are allowed.
Music for Piano 20, for piano (1953)
Composed for the same Cunningham choreography as in Music for Piano 4-19.
Music for Piano 21–36, Music for Piano 37-52 (for piano solo or in an ensemble) (1955)
Composed for the same Cunningham choreography as in Music for Piano 4-19 and Music for Piano 20. This time methods of sound production include noises produced by playing on the body of the piano in various places. In the versions recorded by Steffen Schleiermacher (see below) he employs a "superball" which he rubs on exterior parts of the piano, creating various groaning or moaning sounds. The two groups of sixteen pieces are different in that the limits for chance operations using the I Ching are 1–127 for the first group and 1-32 for the second group, numbers corresponding to relative difficulty of performance. Cage described the compositional process in full in a 1957 article, which was later reprinted in his first book, Silence.
Music for Piano 53–68 (for piano solo or in an ensemble) (1956)
Dedicated to Grete Sultan.
Music for Piano 69–84 (for piano solo or in an ensemble) (1956)
Both collections were composed for the same Cunningham choreography, Solo Suite in Space and Time. Music for Piano 53–68 is dedicated to, and was first performed by, Grete Sultan.
Music for Piano 85 (for piano and electronics) (1962)
Dedicated to Moriyasu Harumi and composed in Osaka. This last piece in the series is different from the others: it is to be performed on its own, and live electronics are to be used. Glissandi are used and feedback instructions are given in the score.

The complete set of pieces, including several versions for multiple pianos, was recorded by pianist Steffen Schleiermacher for Musikproduktion Dabringhaus Und Grimm and released in a 2-CD set in 1998. The set includes "Electronic Music For Piano" in a version for two pianos.

Another complete set of the pieces was issued in 2012 by Brilliant Classics, performed by Giancarlo Simonacci. This set does not include versions for multiple pianos, or the "Electronic Music For Piano".

== See also ==
- Indeterminacy in music
- Chance music
- Prepared piano
- List of compositions by John Cage
- Silence: Lectures and Writings

== Editions ==
- Edition Peters 6729-36. (c) 1960 by Henmar Press. (not including Music for Piano 85)
