= Silence: Lectures and Writings =

Book by John Cage

- First edition
- Author: John Cage
- Language: English
- Genre: Non-fiction
- Publisher: Wesleyan University Press
- Publication date: 1961

Silence: Lectures and Writings is a book by American avant-garde composer John Cage (1912–1992), first published in 1961 by Wesleyan University Press. Silence is a collection of essays and lectures Cage wrote during the period from 1939 to 1961.

Into the 21st-century, Silence has continued interest from artists, with British music journalist Paul Morley calling it "a timeless book about ideas that is itself full of ideas" in 2017.

== Contents ==
The contents of the book are as follows:

- "Foreword" (1961)
- "Manifesto" (1952)
- "The Future of Music: Credo" (1937)
- "Experimental Music" (1957)
- "Experimental Music: Doctrine" (1955)
- "Composition as Process" (1958), essay in three parts:
  - "Changes"
  - "Indeterminacy"
  - "Communication"
- "Composition" (1952–1957), essay in two parts:
  - "To Describe the Process of Composition Used in Music of Changes and Imaginary Landscape No. 4" (1952)
  - "To Describe the Process of Composition Used in Music for Piano 21–52" (1957)
- "Forerunners of Modern Music" (1949)
- "History of Experimental Music in the United States" (1959)
- "Erik Satie" (1958)
- "Edgar Varèse" (1958)
- "Four Statements on the Dance" (1939–1957)
  - "Goal: New Music, New Dance" (1939)
  - "Grace and Clarity" (1944)
  - "In This Day..." (1956)
  - "2 Pages, 122 Words on Music and Dance" (1957)
- "On Robert Rauschenberg, Artist, and His Work" (1961)
- "Lecture on Nothing" (1959)

Note that in the "Afternote" to the Lecture on Nothing (Silence, p. 126) Cage states that it was first delivered in 1949 or 50. Most sources give the date of 1950.

- "Lecture on Something" (1951)
- "45' for a Speaker" (1954)
- "Where Are We Going? and What Are We Doing?" (1961)
- "Indeterminacy" (1958)
- "Music Lovers' Field Companion" (1954)

Most of the works are preceded by a short commentary on their origins, some have an afterword provided. Several works feature unorthodox methods of presentation and/or composition. "The Future of Music: Credo" juxtaposes paragraphs of two different texts. The text of the first part of "Composition as Process" is presented in four columns, the text of "Erik Satie" in two. "45' for a Speaker" is similar to Cage's "time length" compositions: it provides detailed instructions for the speaker as to exactly when a particular sentence or a phrase should be said. "Where Are We Going? and What Are We Doing?" is presented in several types of typeface to better reflect the concept of the lecture, which was originally presented as four tapes running simultaneously. "Indeterminacy" is a collection of various anecdotes and short stories taken from life or books Cage read: the concept is to tell one story per minute, and to achieve the speaker has to either speed up or slow down, depending on the length of the story.

== In popular culture ==
In Paul Auster's novel 4 3 2 1, a friend introduces the protagonist to Silence, telling him "You have to read this, Archie, or else you'll never learn how to think about anything except what other people want you to think." Auster provides a short quote from Cage's book: "The world is teeming: anything can happen".

== See also ==
- List of compositions by John Cage
