= Empty Words (disambiguation) =

Empty Words is a 1979 book by John Cage.

Empty Words may also refer to:

== Songs ==
- "Empty Words" (song), a 2026 song by Corey Kent
- "Empty Words", by Blackmore's Night from Secret Voyage
- "Empty Words", by Bowery Electric from Beat
- "Empty Words", by Breed 77 from In My Blood (En Mi Sangre)
- "Empty Words", by Christina Aguilera from Lotus
- "Empty Words", by Death from Symbolic
- "Empty Words", by The Groop
- "Empty Words", by Quasi from Field Studies
- "Empty Words", by Rich Kids

== Other uses ==
- Empty Words, the official website of Death founder Chuck Schuldiner
- Empty Words, a 2000s series of graphic novels by Benjamin Rivers
- Empty words (Chinese: 虛字; pinyin: Xū zì), a class of words in Classical Chinese grammar

== See also ==
- "Leere Worte" ("Empty Words"), a song by Böhse Onkelz from Viva los tioz
