= Atlas Eclipticalis =

Atlas Eclipticalis may refer to:

- Atlas eclipticalis, 1950.0 a 1958 atlas of stars by Antonín Bečvář
- Atlas Eclipticalis, a 1961–1962 composition by John Cage
