= X (Cage book) =

1983 book by John Cage

- Author: John Cage
- Published: 1983
- Pages: 187 pp.
- ISBN: 0819550906

X: Writings ’79–’82 is a book by American avant-garde composer John Cage (1912–1992), first published in 1983. The book includes mesostics on the names of various people. In the forward to X, Cage writes that the volume's texts represent an attempt "to find a way of writing which comes from ideas, is not about them, but which produces them." The book contains the following works:

- "Foreword" (1983)
- "Writing for the Fourth Time through Finnegans Wake" (1983)
- "'There is not much difference between the two.' (Suzuki Daisetz)." (1979)
- "Toyama 1982" (1982)
- "James Joyce, Marcel Duchamp, Erik Satie: An Alphabet" (1981–83)
- "Another Song" (1981)
- "Writing through the Cantos" (1983)
- (untitled) (1979, also known as "Correction")
- "B.W. 1916–1979" (1979, also known as "Ben Weber, 1916–1979")
- "For her first exhibition with love" (1982)
- "Diary: How to Improve the World (You Will Only Make Matters Worse)" (continued 1973–82)
- "Wishful Thinking" (1983)
- "Muoyce (Writing for the Fifth Time through Finnegans Wake)" (1982, also published earlier as "Muoyce")

== See also ==
- List of compositions by John Cage
