= Roaratorio =

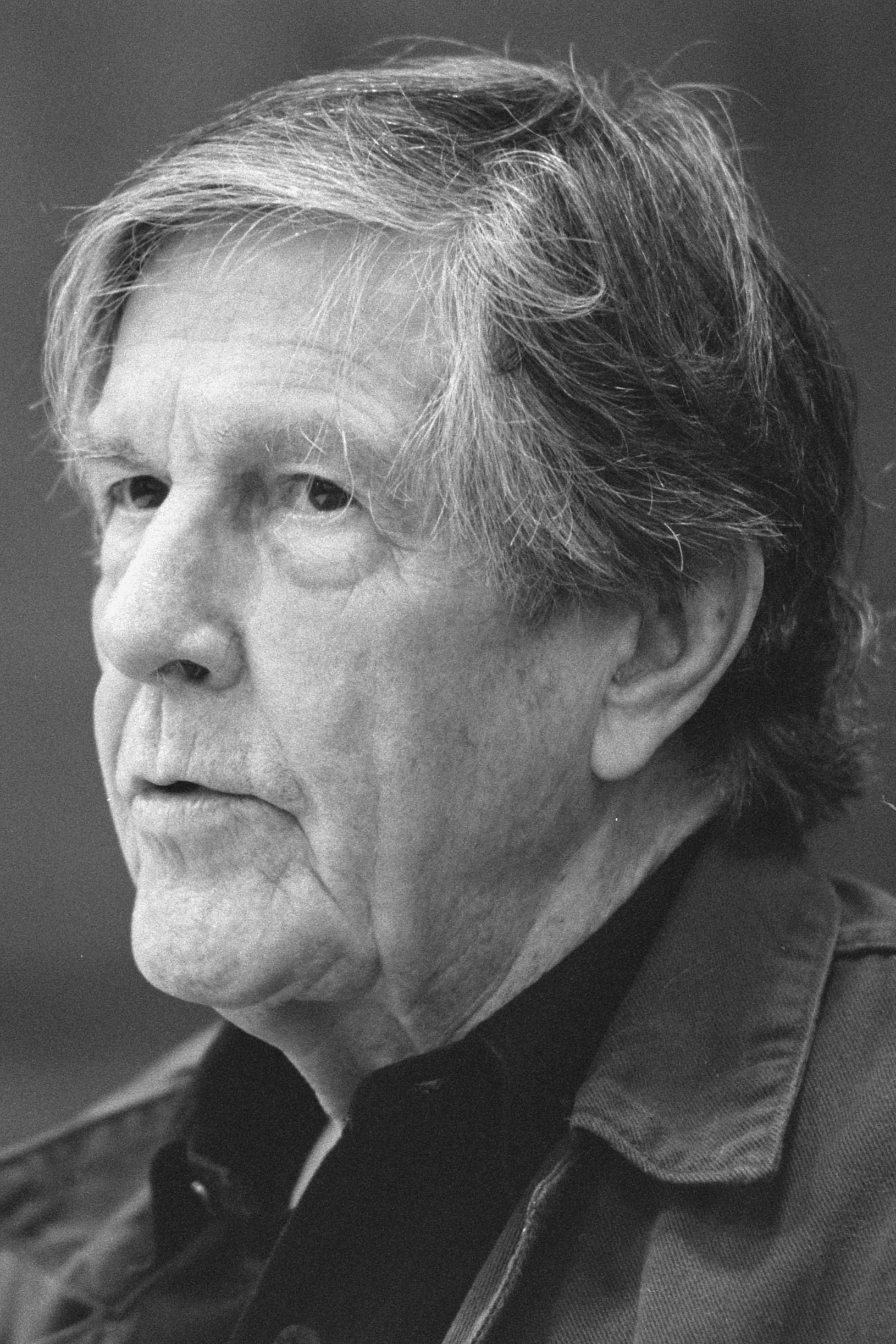
John Cage in 1988

Roaratorio, an Irish circus on Finnegans Wake is a musical composition by American avant‑garde composer John Cage. It was composed in 1979 for Klaus Schöning of West German Radio and premiered as one of the entries in his radio series. The piece realizes Cage’s indeterminate conceptual score “_____, _____ Circus on _____”, which provides instructions on translating any book into performance; for Roaratorio, the source text is James Joyce’s novel Finnegans Wake. Texts from it also appear in Cage’s songs “The Wonderful Widow of Eighteen Springs” (1942) and “Nowth upon Nacht” (1984). The mesostic text of Roaratorio was published separately as Writing for the second time through Finnegans Wake.

== Text source and structure ==
Cage reduced Joyce’s 626‑page novel to a 41‑page mesostic, Writing for the second time through Finnegans Wake, by centre‑column acrostics spelling “JAMES JOYCE” (no repeated syllables).

== Composition ==
The recorded mesostic recital is interwoven with:

- environmental field recordings, selected by I Ching chance operations from the 626 place‑names in Joyce’s novel (mapped via Louis Mink’s A Finnegans Wake Gazetteer) and gathered by radio stations and private individuals;
- improvisations by six Irish musicians.

Cage aligned spatial coordinates (page and line) of each Wake reference with temporal markers (minutes and seconds) in his recording—for example, “Jiccup” (p. 4 l. 11) occurs at 14 seconds into the recital.

== Publication of text ==
Athenäum (Königstein) published the mesostic text in book form in 1982.
