= Empty Words =

1979 book by John Cage

- First edition
- Author: John Cage
- Language: English
- Subject: Music
- Publisher: Wesleyan University Press
- Publication date: 1979
- Publication place: United States
- Media type: Print
- Pages: 199
- ISBN: 978-0819550323

Empty Words: Writings '73–'78 is a book by American avant-garde composer John Cage, first published in 1979 by Wesleyan University Press.

== Contents ==
- "Foreword" (1978)
- "Preface to Lecture on the Weather" (1979)
- "How the Piano Came to be Prepared" (1973)
- "Empty Words" (1974–75)
- "Where Are We Eating? and What Are We Eating? (38 Variations on a Theme by Alison Knowles)" (1975)
- "Series re Morris Graves" (1974)
- "Sixty-One Mesostics Re and Not Re Norman O. Brown" (1979)
- "Writing for the Second Time through Finnegans Wake" (1978)
- "The Future of Music" (1974)

Also included are the following mesostics:

- "Many Happy Returns" (1979)
- "A Long Letter" (1977)
- "Song" (1979)
- "For S. Fort, Dancer" (1979)
- "For William Mc N. Who studied with Ezra Pound" (1979)
- "Wright's Oberlin House Restored by E. Johnson" (1979)
- "'I'm the happiest person I know' (S.W.)" (1975)

== See also ==
- List of compositions by John Cage
