= Prepared harp =

Harp performance

Prepared harp is a method of harp performance, similar in concept to prepared piano, in which foreign objects such as pieces of paper are interwoven into the strings to change the tone of the instrument. Among the pioneers of this technique was harpist Anne LeBaron.

Three sketches for harp solo (1972) by Polish composer Witold Szalonek and harpist Urszula Mazurek are also worth mention.
