= Europeras =

Series of operas by John Cage

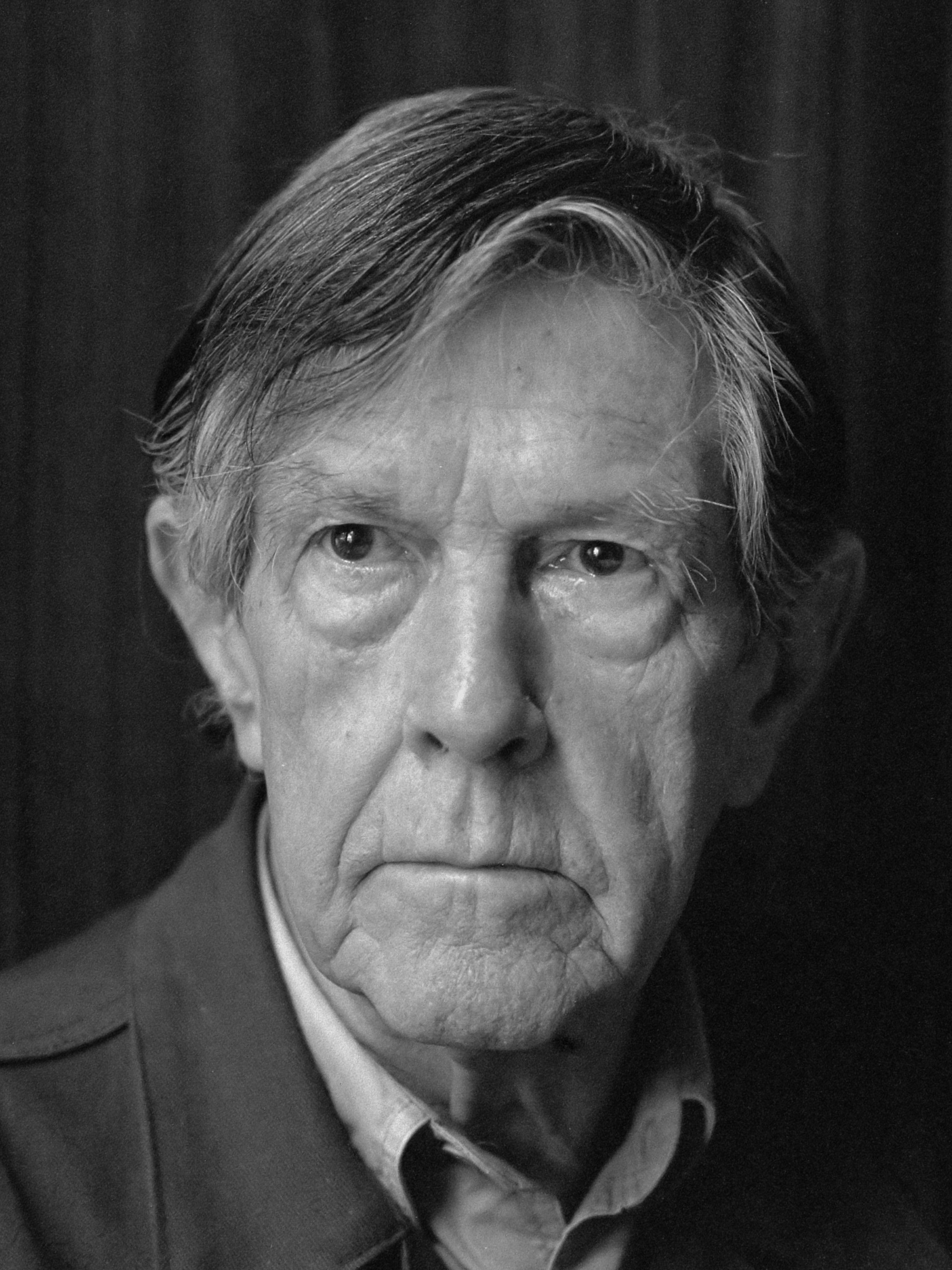
John Cage in 1988

Europeras is a series of five operas by the composer John Cage. Cage explained the punning title thus: "For two hundred years the Europeans have been sending us their operas. Now I'm sending them back."

== Europeras I and II ==
Europeras I and II were premiered by the Frankfurt Opera in December 1987 after a delay caused by fire; both call on the full resources of the house and apply the technique of indeterminacy to plot, stage directions, lighting, costuming, props, and sets, as well as to the music, drawn from fragments of the 18th and 19th century repertoire and intermittently drowned out by a taped Opera Mix, "as if you were shouting to someone on the opposite side of the street and a large truck passes by."

The libretto, in twenty-four scenarios, likewise juxtaposes traditional operatic episodes: the libretto begins "Dressed as an Irish princess, he gives birth; they plot to overthrow the French." The area of the stage is divided into 64 quadrants corresponding to the I Ching and the nineteen singers share the space with dancers. Cage said "What I wanted to do was to have the programs such that if twelve people were sitting in a row each one would be looking at a different opera."
There is no conductor; performers are instead guided by large projections of a digital clock according to strict time intervals. Cage even went so far as to hand out two separate sets of librettos to the audience at the premiere, themselves culled from previous operatic works.

No recordings have yet been released of "Europeras I and II."

== Europeras III and IV ==
Europeras III and IV were commissioned by the Almeida Festival in London and premiered in 1990, subsequently touring. Both prominently feature gramophones, the former in combination with two pianists (replacing the orchestra). The latter is a chamber piece for singer, gramophone and table lamp.

Mode Records issued a 2-CD set of "Europeras III and IV" in 1995: catalog # 37/38.

== Europera V ==
The 60' Europera V, a commission of Yvar Mikhashoff for pianist, two singers, lighting and tape, premiered May 21, 1991 in Amsterdam. The production in the garden of the Museum of Modern Art in New York was the last performance attended by Cage before his death on August 12, 1992.

Mode Records issued a CD of 'Europera V" in 1994: catalog #36.

On May 20, 2025, director of the Detroit Opera Yuval Sharon led a new production of Europera V as the culmination of his "Anarchy at the Opera" 2025 Berlin Family Lecture series at the University of Chicago.

== Sources ==
- Revill, David. 1993. The Roaring Silence: John Cage – a Life. Arcade Publishing. ISBN 1-55970-220-6, ISBN 978-1-55970-220-1
