= Neely Bruce =

American composer, scholar

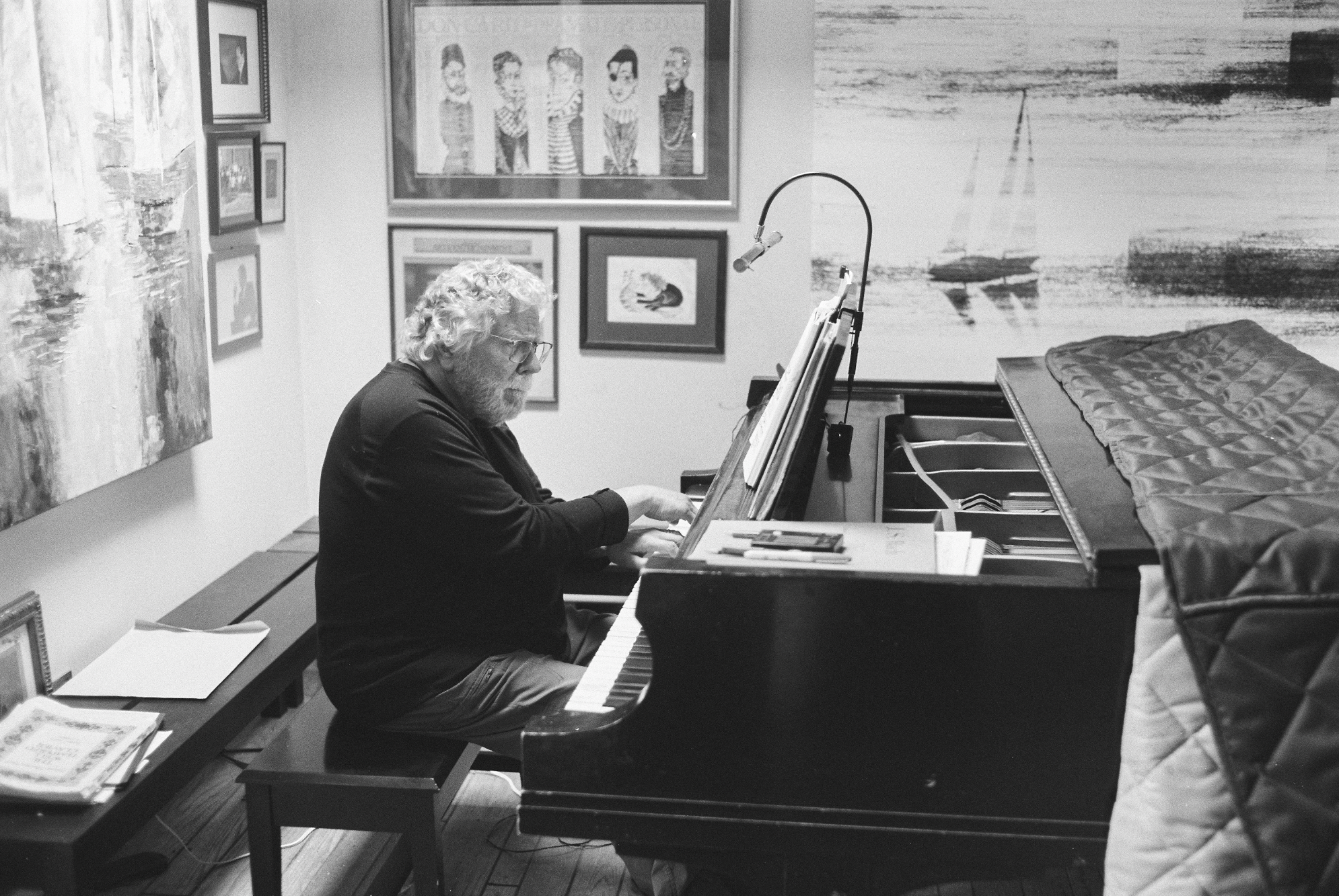
- Neely Bruce at the piano, 2025

Background information
- Born: January 21, 1944; Memphis
- Occupations: Musician, Composer, Scholar
- Instrument: Piano
- Website: www.neelybrucemusic.com

(Frank) Neely Bruce (born January 21, 1944) is an American composer, conductor, pianist, and scholar of American music. He is the composer of over 800 works including three full-length operas. Currently, he is John Spencer Camp Professor of Music and American Studies at Wesleyan University, where he has taught since 1974.

== Life and career ==
Bruce's undergraduate degree is from the University of Alabama at Tuscaloosa. His DMA is from the University of Illinois at Urbana-Champaign. Bruce also received an MAA from Wesleyan University and an MMU from the University of Illinois at Urbana-Champaign. His principal teachers were Ben Johnston, Hubert Kessler, J. F. Goossen, Lara Hoggard, Charles Hamm, Byrnell Figler, Roy McAllister, Soulima Stravinsky and Sophia Rosoff. Bruce was one of the seven keyboard players in the 1969 premiere of John Cage's HPSCHD.

He has been visiting professor and artist-in-residence at Middlebury College, Bucknell University, the University of Michigan, and at Brooklyn College. He was the founder and director of the American Music/Theatre Group, chorus director for the Connecticut Opera, and was director of music at South Congregational Church in Middletown, Connecticut.

He is the first pianist ever to play the entire song oeuvre of Charles Ives. He performed with several singers as part of the Ives Vocal Marathon.

== Works ==
Bruce has written more than 800 works, including three full-length operas, choral works in all major genres, orchestral works, chamber music, a voluminous quantity of piano music, and music for mixed media, including seven documentary scores for public television. He has also written a variety of music for young people, including a new adaptation of the Brothers Grimm fairy tale Hansel and Gretel, which uses American popular music, such as rock and roll, pop, and rap.

=== Flora, Hansel and Gretel, and Americana, or A New Tale of the Genii ===
Flora is an opera in two acts and six scenes based on the libretto and surviving tunes of what is thought to be the first piece of musical theater performed in colonial North America. The historical work premiered in Charleston, South Carolina in 1735, and played again at the newly built Dock Street Theatre in 1736.

The modern score was commissioned by the Spoleto Festival USA and premiered by the company on May 29, 2010, to celebrate the reopening of the new Dock Street Theatre. Writing for the New York Times, James R. Oestreich praised the work and performance, stating: Bruce "did a remarkable job . . . evoking the musical world of the 18th century . . . the rest of the production is of similarly high quality." "Mr. Bruce conducted, from the harpsichord, members of the festival orchestra and a strong cast." (A complete live recording of the work can be found online at NPR's World of Opera.)

Hansel and Gretel, an opera in two acts and nine scenes, based on a libretto adapted by the composer from the Brothers Grimm, was commissioned by Connecticut Opera and premiered by the company on March 20, 1998, in Hartford, Connecticut. The company toured a condensed version for children in 1997. In an enthusiastic review of the full premiere, Hartford Courant music critic Steve Metcalf commented on Bruce's creating a new operatic Hansel and Gretel:

“temerity has never been a problem for Neely Bruce . . . by blending a careful fidelity to the original Grimm story with his own manic imagination, [the composer] has created a clever and deeply entertaining new operatic journey into the woods . . . in a dizzying range of musical styles . . . about as far away from Engelbert Humperdinck as it would be possible to get. . . . [Hansel and Gretel] danced, skipped, roller-skated, high- fived and also sang their way through their troubles with unfailing and non-cloying freshness."

Americana, or, A New Tale of the Genii, an opera in four acts, is based on a libretto adapted by Tony Connor from an anonymous 18th century source, which recounted the colonies' secession as allegorical parody. It was premiered in 1985 in a concert version by the American Music/Theatre Group, conducted by James Sinclair, in Hartford and Stamford, Connecticut, and New York City. Commenting on the premiere at Symphony Space for the New York Times, Will Crutchfield wrote:

Bruce's new score "evinced its own quirky appeal . . . Now Boyce and Arne, now Stravinskian “wrong-note” classicism, now modestly chaotic improvisation, then hymnody, bluegrass, blues . . . the concept [of the work] is one for which pastiche has meaning. . . . The piece is odd enough and lively enough to merit a fully professional production.”

=== Circular 14: The Apotheosis of Aristides ===
Bruce's two-hour oratorio Circular 14: The Apotheosis of Aristides, for eight soloists, two choruses and large orchestra, was written to dramatized the life of Aristides de Sousa Mendes, a Portuguese diplomat in Bordeaux during World War II who saved many people by issuing life-saving visas, in defiance of the Salazar regime. Neely states: "He has taught me that one person makes a big difference; that genuine courage can still be found; that you can do the right thing for the right reason; that you can suffer the slings and arrows of outrageous fortune with grace and humility; and that the petty dictators of this world do not have the last word. He was a truly great man, and his story needs to be shouted from the rooftops."

It received its first full-scale production in Salt Lake City on January 27, 2018. An early version, orchestrated for chamber music forces, was premiered in Los Angeles on January 24, 2016. About the performance Eric A. Gordon writes: "Circular 14 contains music of great variety and often unearthly transcendence...One can compare it to the great masterpieces in this form."
