= Mineko Grimmer =

Japanese-American artist (born 1949)

- 美音子グリマー
- Born: 1949 (age 76–77); Hanamaki, Iwate Prefecture, Japan
- Education: Otis College of Art and Design

Mineko Grimmer (美音子グリマー, born 1949) is a Los Angeles–based installation sound artist. Her work is influenced by both Eastern and Western cultures. She is inspired by the chance elements of John Cage as well as notions of time in Shinto shrines and Zen Gardens. Sound and silence are key elements in her work. The sculptures are finely crafted out of materials like bamboo, redwood, stone and water.

== Education and early work ==
Grimmer was born and raised in northern Japan and received her B.F.A and M.F.A from Otis College of Art and Design.

In the 1970s as a student at Otis she photographed the passage of time by photographing natural phenomena like shadows, waves and wind. At this time Grimmer started photographing blocks of ice and then freezing objects in blocks of ice The sound element intrigued her and in 1980's Grimmer started adding the sound element of melting ice in her installations. The first ice sculpture was shown at the Japan America Community Culture Center in downtown Los Angeles.

== Work and career ==
Grimmer collaborated with the composers Carl Stone, Mamoru Fujieda and John Cage. Cage and Grimmer collaborated on a project at MOCA in 1993. John Cage described her work as "beautiful and beautiful to listen to". Her sculpture is also included in John Cage's Number Pieces. Her work has been included in the SoundCulture Festival held in Japan in 1993.

== Collections ==
- Singlewheel, 1984, mixed media. Smithsonian Museum of Art.
- Remembering Plato, 1992, mixed media. Menil Collection.

== Public projects ==
- CMC Medical Plaza Foundation, 1989
