= Syvilla Fort =

American dancer, choreographer, and dance teacher

- Born: July 3, 1917
- Died: November 8, 1975 (aged 58)
- Occupation(s): Dancer, dance educator

Syvilla Fort (July 3, 1917 – November 8, 1975) was an American dancer, choreographer, and dance teacher. Born in Seattle, she drew on her African-American heritage in her original dance works. American composer John Cage wrote his first piece for prepared piano, Bacchanale (1940), for a dance by Fort. She died from breast cancer at the age of 58.

== Biography ==
Born in Seattle, Washington, Syvilla Fort began studying dance when she was three years old. After she was denied admission to several ballet schools because 'whites' practiced a system of color-based discrimination, Fort's early dance education took place in her home and in private lessons. By the time she was nine years old, Fort was teaching ballet, tap, and modern dance to small groups of neighborhood children who could not afford private lessons.

Fort attended the Cornish School of Allied Arts in Seattle as their first black student after graduating from high school in 1932. After spending five years at the Cornish School, Fort decided to pursue her dance career in Los Angeles, and in 1939 her neighbor, black composer William Grant Still, introduced Fort to dancer Katherine Dunham. Several weeks later, Fort began dancing and touring with the Katherine Dunham Company and learning the Dunham technique, which was rooted in the dance traditions of Africa, Haiti, and Trinidad. Fort danced with the company until 1945 and was included in the well-known film Stormy Weather (1943).

While dancing with the Dunham Company, Fort neglected a serious knee injury which prevented her from performing professionally by the mid-1940s. In 1948, Dunham appointed Fort as chief administrator and dance teacher of the Katherine Dunham School of Dance in New York, a position Fort retained until 1954 when the school closed because of financial problems. In 1955, Fort joined her husband Buddy Phillips to open a dance studio on West 44th Street in New York. In this studio Fort developed what she called the "Afro-Modern technique" which fused the Dunham approach with modern styles of dance that Fort learned in her early education. She continued to use this method in her work as a part-time instructor of physical education at Columbia University's Teachers College from 1967 to 1975.

The studio on 44th Street thrived until 1975 when Fort began struggling against breast cancer and was unable to solve the school's financial problems. Her staff and students found a new studio for Fort on West 23rd Street where she taught through the summer of 1975. Fort shaped three generations of dancers and among her best-known students were Marlon Brando, James Dean, Jane Fonda, James Earl Jones, Eartha Kitt, José Limón, Chita Rivera, and Geoffrey Holder.

== Death and legacy ==
Five days before her death from breast cancer on November 8, 1975, Fort attended a tribute to her life's work which was organized by the Black Theater Alliance and hosted by her student Alvin Ailey and by Harry Belafonte. In 1992, Fort's work was honored again when dancers from several companies performed an evening of her choreography at New York's Symphony Space.

Buddy Phillips' son Sabur Abdul-Salaam, Syvilla's stepson, published a book, Spiritual Journey of An American Muslim, that includes additional information about her.

A short film was made of her by Ayoka Chenzira, Syvilla: They Dance to Her Drum (Short) (1979).
