= Six Melodies (Cage) =

Six Melodies is a collection of six pieces for violin and keyboard instrument by John Cage. It was composed in 1950, shortly after Cage completed his String Quartet in Four Parts. The work uses the same techniques: the gamut technique and the nested rhythmic proportions. First, a fixed number of sonorities (single tones, intervals and aggregates) is prepared, each created independently of the other. These sonorities are called gamuts. Sequences of gamuts are then used to create melodies with harmonic backgrounds that are in no way connected to functional harmony, which Cage sought to avoid. The collection of gamuts used in Six Melodies is nearly identical to the one used in the String Quartet (Cage called Six Melodies "a postscript" to that work). The structure of each piece, and that of each phrase, is defined by the same rhythmic pattern: 3 1/2, 3 1/2, 4, 4, 3, 4. The violinist is instructed in the score to play without vibrato and with minimum weight on the bow.

== Editions ==
- Edition Peters 6748. (c) 1960 by Henmar Press.
- Edition Peters EP68526. (c) 2015 – Violin & Guitar by Aaron Larget-Caplan

== See also ==
- List of compositions by John Cage
