= Music of Changes =

Music of Changes is a piece for solo piano by John Cage. Composed in 1951 for pianist and friend David Tudor, it is a ground-breaking piece of indeterminate music. The process of composition involved applying decisions made using the I Ching, a Chinese classic text that is commonly used as a divination system. The I Ching was applied to large charts of sounds, durations, dynamics, tempo and densities.

== History of composition ==
I Ching divination involves obtaining a hexagram by random generation (such as tossing coins), then reading the chapter associated with that hexagram.

Music of Changes was the second work Cage composed to be fully indeterminate in some sense (the first is Imaginary Landscape No. 4, completed in April 1951, and the third movement of Concerto for prepared piano also used chance), and the first instrumental work that uses chance throughout. He was still using magic square-like charts to introduce chance into composition, when, in early 1951, Christian Wolff presented Cage with a copy of the I Ching (Wolff's father published a translation of the book at around the same time). This Chinese classic text is a symbol system used to identify order in chance events. For Cage it became a perfect tool to create chance-controlled compositions: he would "ask" the book questions about various aspects of the composition at hand, and use the answers to compose. The vast majority of pieces Cage completed after 1951 were created using the I Ching.

The title of Music of Changes is derived from the title sometimes given to the I Ching, "Book of Changes." Cage set to work on the piece almost immediately after receiving the book. The dates of composition are as follows: Book I completed on May 16, Book II on August 2, Book III on October 18 and Book IV on December 13. Cage's former mentor Henry Cowell remarked that Cage had not freed himself from his tastes in the new work, and so for a short while Cage worked simultaneously on Music of Changes and Imaginary Landscape No. 4, which was to do what Cowell suggested. Apparently Cage felt that by using the random sounds of the radio he would avoid personal taste. It is very likely that Cowell came to the conclusion that Cage had not freed himself from his personal tastes because the individual elements of the work (notes, chords, sound complexes, etc.) were composed freely according to Cage's whim, without regard to chance operations. Chance operations with the I Ching were employed to arrange these previously composed elements.

The piece is dedicated to David Tudor, a pianist and friend with whom Cage would have a lifelong association. The two met in 1950 through Morton Feldman and Music of Changes was a sort of a collaboration between them. Tudor would learn parts of the score as soon as they were completed, although it was very hard for the pianist: Cage recalls that Tudor had to learn "a form of mathematics which he didn’t know before", and that this was "a very difficult process and very confusing for him." Music of Changes was premièred in its complete form by Tudor on 1 January 1952 (although the pianist had played Book I in public earlier, on 5 July 1951). Tudor also recorded Music of Changes in its complete form, in 1956.

Cage also composed several "spin-offs" of Music of Changes, shorter pieces using the same methods and even the same charts. These include Two Pastorales (1951–52), Seven Haiku (1951–52), For M.C. and D.T. (1952). The process Cage was using at the time to create music with the I Ching proved to be rather slow, so the composer would soon create a faster method in his Music for Piano series.

== Analysis ==
Music of Changes comprises four "books" of music. Cage used a heavily modified version of his chart system (previously used in Concerto for prepared piano). Every chart for Music of Changes is 8 by 8 cells, to facilitate working with the I Ching which has a total of 64 hexagrams. The I Ching is first consulted about which sound event to choose from a sounds chart, then a similar procedure is applied to durations and dynamics charts. Thus, a short segment of music is composed. Silences are obtained from the sounds charts: these only contain sounds in the odd-numbered cells. To introduce new material, all charts alternate between mobile and immobile states (the alteration governed by the I Ching as well); in the latter the chart remains unchanged, but in the former, once a particular cell is used, its contents are immediately replaced by something new.

Furthermore, a density chart is used in the same way to add "polyphony" to the piece. The above procedure results in a layer—a string of sound events—and then the I Ching is used to determine how many layers should there be in a given phrase. The layers are then simply combined with one another. There may be anywhere from one to eight layers in a phrase.

The structure of the piece is defined through the technique of nested proportions, just like in most of Cage's pieces from the 1940s. The proportion remains the same for the entire work: 3, 5, 6 3/4, 6 3/4, 5, 3 1/8. So there are 29 5/8 sections, each divided into phrases according to the overall proportion: 29 5/8 by 29 5/8. This is then divided into four large parts of one, two, one and two sections respectively. The tempo is varied throughout the piece, using the I Ching and a tempo chart. The rhythmic proportion is expressed, then, not through changing time signatures as in earlier works, but through tempo changes.

Excerpt from Book IV
Recording by David Tudor, the dedicatee of the work

Excerpt from Book IV of Music of Changes in Cage's calligraphic score. The number 104 indicates current tempo. The vertical lines are not barlines in the conventional sense, but simply indicate the middle of the staff length. A cross indicates the moment when sound stops; diamond-shaped notes are depressed but not sounded.

The notation of the piece is proportional: Cage standardized the horizontal distance between notes with the same rhythmic value. A quarter note is equal to two and a half centimeters (almost exactly one inch) in the score. Each sound begins at a precise position indicated by the stem of the note, rather than its note head. The tempo is indicated using large numbers above the staves, accompanied with instructions: whether to accelerate from a given value or to slow down. Various other alterations to standard notation are used to indicate unconventional performance techniques: some notes are depressed but not sounded, some are played on the strings rather than the keys, occasionally the pianist hits various parts of the instrument with specially provided beaters, or snaps the lid to produce a sharp percussive sound. Cage remarks in the foreword to the score that in many places "the notation is irrational; in such instances the performer is to employ his own discretion." The dynamics of the piece range from ffff to pppp.

== Notes ==
=== Sources ===
- Edition Peters 6256-6259 (books 1–4). (c) 1961 Henmar Press. This is a facsimile of Cage's original, handwritten score. Each book is published separately.
- Kostelanetz, Richard. 2003. Conversing with Cage, 2nd edition. New York: Routledge. ISBN 0-415-93792-2.
- Pritchett, James. 1988. "From Choice to Chance: John Cage's Concerto for Prepared Piano." Perspectives of New Music 26, no. 1 (Fall): 50–81.
- Pritchett, James. 1993. The Music of John Cage. Cambridge University Press. ISBN 0-521-56544-8.
