= Number Pieces =

Body of compositions by John Cage

Two time brackets from Five (1988), the first one flexible, the second fixed

The term Number Pieces refers to a body of late compositions (40, or 41 if Seventeen was actually composed) by John Cage. Each piece is named after the number of performers involved: for instance, Seven is a piece for seven performers, One^{9} (read "One Nine") is the ninth work for one performer, and 1O1 is a piece for an orchestra of 101 musicians. The vast majority of these works were composed using Cage's time bracket technique: the score consists of short fragments (frequently just one note, with or without dynamics) and indications, in minutes and seconds, during which the fragment can start and by what time it should end. Time brackets can be fixed (e.g. from 1.15 to 2.00) or flexible (e.g. from anywhere between 1.15 and 1.45, and to anywhere between 2.00 and 2.30).

All of the Number Pieces were composed during the last six years of Cage's life, 1987–1992. Most are for traditional instruments, with six exceptions that range from works for rainsticks, the Japanese aerophone shō and conch shells to an electronically amplified version of 4′33″. This article lists all Number Pieces, organized by number of performers.

== List of Number Pieces ==
=== One ===
| Title | Instrumentation | Date of composition | Dedicatee(s) | Details |
|---|---|---|---|---|
| One | piano | December 1987 | Juan Allende-Blin | 10 time brackets, all flexible except for the ninth. Each contains music written on two staves, but the content of one staff can be played in any relation with that of the other staff. |
| One^{2} | 1–4 pianos | Summer 1989 | Margaret Leng Tan | The pianist moves between several pianos (in 1992 Cage advised Margaret Leng Tan to use the I Ching to coordinate her movements). All instruments have their damper pedals wedged, so that the strings vibrate freely throughout the piece. |
| One^{3} | unspecified (amplified ambient sound) | late 1989 | | Full title: One^{3} = 4′33″ (0′00″) + 𝄞. There are no time brackets. The performer is to arrange a sound system so that "the whole hall is on the edge of feedback, without actually feeding back." Thus the composition consists entirely of electronically amplified sound of the hall and the audience. |
| One^{4} | percussion | 1990 | Fritz Hauser | 6 time brackets for the left hand and 8 for the right. Each contains a numeral on a stave, referring to an instrument — the piece is to be performed on "cymbals and/or drums chosen by the drummer." Cage adds that the sounds produced should be either very long or very short. |
| One^{5} | piano | May 1990 | Ellsworth Snyder | 21 time brackets for the left hand and 24 for the right. Each contains a single chord or a single note. The performer is instructed to either hold the pedal throughout, or make as many overlappings as possible (again, using the pedal if necessary). |
| One^{6} | violin | June 1990 | János Négyesy | The time brackets are extremely long in this piece, up to 7 minutes, many overlap, and all contain just a single tone. Performances of the piece can be accompanied by a sound sculpture by Mineko Grimmer, which is made of ice with pebbles in it. When the ice melts, the pebbles fall and strike wires, producing sound, and then fall into a pool of water. One^{6} was initially intended for Paul Zukofsky. |
| One^{7} | unspecified | Fall 1990 | Pauline Oliveros | This piece is the first part from Four^{6}. The performer chooses 12 different sounds and plays within flexible time brackets. |
| One^{8} | cello with curved bow | April 1991 | Michael Bach | There are 53 time brackets, each with a single sound produced on one, two, three or four strings. This Number Piece is microtonal. It may be performed with 108. |
| One^{9} | shō | July 1991 | Mayumi Miyata | Ten movements, amounting to maximum total duration of 121 minutes. Any three movements of this piece may be performed with 108. |
| One^{10} | violin | February 1992 | | Each time bracket contains a single sound. Like One^{6}, this piece can be performed simultaneously with a sound sculpture by Mineko Grimmer; the sculpture is essentially the same as in the earlier piece, but in a different configuration. |
| One^{11} | unspecified (film) | 1992 | | This Number Piece is a film that consists of chance-determined play of electric light. It is scored for "solo cameraman." It may be performed with 103. |
| One^{12} | voice | 1992 | Alfonso Fratteggiani Bianchi and the Quaderni Perugini di Musica Contemporanea | Possibly not a separate work, but a performing score for One^{7}. The score contains instructions for creating a chance-determined series of 640 numbers between 1 and 12. The numbers are then interpreted as vowels or consonants (numbers 2–11), words (12) or "empty words" (1; pronouns, articles, etc.). The choice of words is left to the performer. |
| One^{13} | cello with curved bow 1 live and 3 recorded cellos | July–August 1992 | co-author is Michael Bach Bachtischa | The work remained incomplete at the time of John Cage's death but was published in 2009 as a collaborative composition with Michael Bach Bachtischa. The work has four voices, all playing the same note, but with various differences. |

=== Two ===
| Title | Instrumentation | Date of composition | Dedicatee(s) | Details |
|---|---|---|---|---|
| Two | flute and piano | December 1987 | Roberto Fabbriciani and Carlo Neri | This was the first Number Piece. Both parts contain 9 flexible time brackets and one fixed. Originally devised for flute and vibraphone, the flute part has only three different pitches and is quiet throughout, dynamics ranging from mp to pp. The piano part is notated on two staves, with the content of one played in any relation to that of the other. Each piano time bracket consists of 7 to 10 sounds. |
| Two^{2} | 2 pianos | Summer 1989 | For "Double Edge": Edmund Niemann and Nurit Tilles | This piece does not use time brackets. The score consists of 36 lines of music, 5 bars each. There are 31 sound events per each line, divided 5, 7, 5; 7, 7 as in Renga poetry. The pianists play one bar at a time in different tempi, both have to finish playing the bar at hand before moving to the next one. |
| Two^{3} | shō and five conch shells | July 1991 | | The shō part is the solo shō Number Piece, One^{9}. There are 10 movements in this work, amounting to 121 minutes total duration. The conch shell parts contain only fixed time brackets. Within each time bracket there are two numbers: the first refers to the conch, the second, in superscript, refers to the intended number of bubbles to be produced (the shells are filled with water and "played" by carefully tipping them until a bubble forms inside, producing a sound). Any three movements of this piece may be performed with 108. |
| Two^{4} | violin and piano or shō | July 1991 | Commissioned by the McKim Fund of the Library of Congress | Only flexible time brackets are used. The violin part is microtonal and consists for the most part of long sounds. It is divided into three movements. The piano/shō part contains mostly short sounds and is in four movements. |
| Two^{5} | tenor trombone and piano | October 1991 | Hildegard Kleeb and Roland Dahinden | The trombone part is microtonal. Both parts include silences (up to 5 minutes). |
| Two^{6} | violin and piano | April 1992 | Ami Flammer and Martine Joste | The time brackets of Two^{6} are empty and the performers have to fill them themselves. The pianist's material consists of parts of Extended Lullaby (chance-determined variations of Erik Satie's Vexations) and sequences of ascending pitches. The violinist chooses between silence, microtonal passages, or dyads from chance-determined pitches. |

=== Three ===
| Title | Instrumentation | Date of composition | Dedicatee(s) | Details |
|---|---|---|---|---|
| Three | a variety of recorders | July 1989 | Trio Dolce: Christine Brelowski, Geesche Geddert, and Dorothea Winter | The three performers all use several instruments: the first uses sopranino, soprano, alto and tenor recorders, the second sopranino, soprano, alto, basset, tenor and bass, the third soprano, alto, basset, tenor and double bass. The outer movements are to be performed "as legato as possible." |
| Three^{2} | unspecified percussion | May 1991 | Michael Pugliese and the Talking Drums | |

=== Four ===
| Title | Instrumentation | Date of composition | Dedicatee(s) | Details |
|---|---|---|---|---|
| Four | string quartet | 1989, before May 9 | Arditti Quartet | There are three five-minute sections: A, B, and C. All parts contain 10 time brackets, 9 flexible and one fixed. The structure of the piece varies depending on how long the desired duration is. For a 10-minute performance, section B is played once, then the performers exchange their parts according to the instructions in the score, and then section B is played again. For a 20-minute performance, only sections A and C are played, without pause, but again with the performers exchanging parts between sections. Finally, a complete 30-minute performance requires the sections played in the ABC order twice. Time brackets contain only single tones at low dynamics (p to ppp). |
| Four^{2} | SATB chorus | October 1990 | Madrigal Choir of the Hood River Valley High School | There are 3 time brackets for sopranos, 4 for altos, 6 for tenors, and 6 for the basses. The score also supplies a pronunciation table. Each section of the chorus (sopranos, altos, etc.) may be divided into two or more groups, so that one group started the sound and the other continued it. |
| Four^{3} | 1–2 pianos, violin or oscillator, 12 rainsticks (three for each performer) | May 1991 | Merce Cunningham Dance Company | There are 24 empty flexible time brackets, to be filled by the performers. The piano part is to be constructed from Extended Lullaby, 48 chance-determined variations on Erik Satie's Vexations. Each of these consists of 12 eighth notes. Sounds other than the piano are silence, a high frequency sine wave played on an oscillator or on a violin (without vibrato), and the sound of rainsticks (played by tilting them). |
| Four^{4} | percussion | October 1991 | Amadinda Percussion Group | The four performers have 22, 16, 10 and 15 time brackets respectively. Instruments are chosen by the performers; the time brackets only contain numerals to refer to different instruments. |
| Four^{5} | four saxophones | October 1991 | John Sampen | |
| Four^{6} | unspecified | March 1992 | Pauline Oliveros, Joan La Barbara, William Winant and Leonard Stein | Each performer chooses 12 different sounds and plays within flexible time brackets. The sounds must have fixed amplitude, overtone structure, etc. The first performer's part may be performed solo, as One^{7}. |

=== Five ===
| Title | Instrumentation | Date of composition | Dedicatee(s) | Details |
|---|---|---|---|---|
| Five | unspecified instruments or voices | January 1988 | Wilfried Brennecke and the Wittener Tage für neue Kammermusik | One of the earliest Number Pieces. Although the instruments are unspecified, pitches and dynamics are provided. Each part contains five time brackets, and each time bracket contains one, two, or three sounds. |
| Five^{2} | English horn, 2 clarinets, bass clarinet, timpani | May 1991 | Mauricio Kagel | A birthday present for Mauricio Kagel. Every part contains five time brackets; the parts are nearly identical in the durations of the brackets (except for time bracket no. 3). The first two brackets for timpani and the last two for English horn are silences; all others contains one, two, or three sounds. |
| Five^{3} | trombone and string quartet | October 1991 | James Fulkerson and the Mondriaan Quartet | |
| Five^{4} | two saxophones and percussion | October 1991 | In Memoriam Stefan Wolpe | |
| Five^{5} | flute, 2 clarinets, bass clarinet and percussion | October 1991 | Thomas Nee | Every time bracket contains a single sound. |

=== Six to Twenty ===
| Title | Instrumentation | Date of composition | Dedicatee(s) | Details |
|---|---|---|---|---|
| Six | percussion | September 1991 | Slagwerk Den Haag (Percussion The Hague) | Time brackets contain single sounds. Long sounds should be played softly, using tremolo and/or with brushes. |
| Seven | flute, clarinet, percussion, piano, violin, viola and cello | May 1988 | Boston "Musica Viva", "The Voices of Change" in Dallas, and the San Francisco Contemporary Music Players | Each part contains 20 time brackets, all but one flexible. The duration of the brackets is the same, but again, always with one exception. Flute, clarinet, and percussion play single sounds, brackets for strings contain from one to three sounds, and the piano part has three to five sounds per bracket. |
| Seven^{2} | bass flute, bass clarinet, bass trombone, unspecified percussion, cello and contrabass | 1990, before July 23 | Heinz-Klaus Metzger and Rainer Riehn | Percussionists should use "any very resonant instruments." |
| Eight | flute, oboe, clarinet, bassoon, horn, trumpet, tenor trombone and tuba | 1991 | Trisha Brown Dance Company | This large (more than 80 time brackets per each part) piece was choreographed by Trisha Brown as Astral Converted. |
| Ten | flute, oboe, clarinet, trombone, percussion, piano, 2 violins, viola and cello | October–November, 1991 | Ives Ensemble | The percussionist uses any ten different instruments, which must be able to produce both long and short sounds. The piano is played both normally and using extended techniques, i.e. on the strings, or hitting parts of the instrument, etc. All other instruments play microtonal passages. |
| Thirteen | flute, oboe, clarinet in B-flat, bassoon, trumpet in C, tenor trombone, tuba, two percussionists, 2 violins, viola and cello | May 1992 | Manfred Reichert and the Ensemble 13, commissioned by the City of Gütersloh | The number of time brackets per part ranges from 39 (clarinet) to 89 (xylophones). The piece is some 30 minutes long. Long sounds should be played softly. |
| Fourteen | flute/piccolo, bass flute, clarinet, bass clarinet, horn, trumpet, two percussionists, bowed piano, 2 violins, viola, cello and double bass | 1990 | Commissioned by the Zürcher Oberland for Werner Bärtschi and René Müller | The number of time brackets per part ranges from 5 (bass flute) to 22 (piano). The piece is some 20 minutes long. Percussionists use "any very resonant instruments." |
| Sixteen | flute, oboe, clarinet, bassoon, horn, trumpet, trombone, bass trombone, piano, percussion, 2 violins, viola, cello and double bass | Spring 1992 | | Unfinished. Manfred Reichert reported that this was the original version of Thirteen. |
| Seventeen | N/A | N/A | N/A | No score known. Mentioned by Cage in an interview; possibly a mistake on his part. See Sixteen. |

=== Twenty to 108 ===
Cage's late orchestral works are to be performed without a conductor.

| Title | Instrumentation | Date of composition | Dedicatee(s) | Details |
|---|---|---|---|---|
| Twenty-Three | upper strings (13-5-5-0) | 1988, before June 21 | Commissioned by the Yellow Barn Music Festival | Each performer has their own chronometer, and decides when to start. |
| Twenty-Six | 26 violins | December 1991 | Rundfunk-Sinfonieorchester Saarbrücken and the Alte Oper | This piece may be performed with Twenty-Eight (Fifty-Four), Twenty-Nine (Fifty-Five), or both (Eighty-Three). All time brackets contain a single sound. The first violin starts the videoclock. |
| Twenty-Eight | 3 flutes, 1 alto flute, 4 clarinets, 3 oboes, 1 English horn, 3 bassoons, 1 contrabassoon, 4 trumpets, 4 horns, 2 trombones, 1 bass trombone, 1 tuba | December 1991 | Rundfunk-Sinfonieorchester Saarbrücken and the Alte Oper | This piece may be performed with Twenty-Six (Fifty-Four), Twenty-Nine (Fifty-Seven), or both (Eighty-Three). All time brackets contain a single sound. The first flute starts the videoclock. |
| Twenty-Nine | 2 timpani, 2 percussionists, bowed piano, lower strings (0-10-8-6) | December 1991 | Rundfunk-Sinfonieorchester Saarbrücken and the Alte Oper | This piece may be performed with Twenty-Six (Fifty-Five), Twenty-Eight (Fifty-Seven), or both (Eighty-Three). All time brackets contain a single sound. The first viola starts the videoclock. |
| Fifty-Eight | 3 piccolos, 4 flutes, 3 alto flutes, 4 oboes, 3 English horns, 4 B-flat clarinets, 3 bass clarinets, 4 bassoons, 3 contrabassoons, 3 soprano saxophones, 3 alto saxophones, 3 tenor saxophones, 3 baritone saxophones, 4 horns, 4 trumpets, 4 tenor trombones and 3 tubas | March 1992 | Solf Schaefer and the Österreichische Rundfunk (Pannonisches Blasorchester) | This large work (some 60–70 time brackets per part) was composed to be performed at The Landhaus in Graz, a 16th-century Renaissance building. The Landhaus has 58 arches, in which the performers were to be positioned. |
| Sixty-Eight | 3 alto flutes, 3 Cor Anglais, 5 clarinets, 5 trumpets, 4 percussionists, 2 pianos, strings (14-12-10-10-0) | February 1992 | Ernstalbrecht Stiebler and the Sinfonieorchester des Hessischer Rundfunks | Each part has 15 time brackets, each with a single sound. The sequence of pitches is always the same, but time bracket durations are different. |
| Seventy-Four | 3333–4331, 2 pianos, 2 percussionists, harp and strings (14-10-8-8-6) | March 1992 | Francis Thorne, Dennis Russell Davies and the American Composers Orchestra | There are just two parts: one for high instruments, another for low. Performance notes suggest slight exaggeration of the usual imperfection of tuning, to give the impression of a microtonal work. |
| Eighty | 7 alto flutes, 7 English horns, 7 clarinets, 7 trumpets, upper strings (16-14-12-10-0) | February 1992 | András Wilheim | All parts are identical, only transposed for each instrument. Premiered on 28 October 2011 at Munich's Herkulessaal, with the Symphonieorchester des Bayerischen Rundfunks conducted by David Robertson. |
| 1O1 | 4 (picc, alto) 4 (2 cor anglais) 4 (bass clarinet) 4 (contrabassoon) – 6431, timpani, 4 percussionists, piano, harp, strings (18-16-11-11-8) | 1988, before November 13 | Boston Symphony Orchestra | The title is to be spelled with capital "O" (unlike 103 and 108). The instrumentation includes bullroarers and angklungs. Although the piece is scored for a large orchestra, the duration is approximately 12 minutes, and the maximum number of time brackets per part is 12. |
| 103 | 4 (+picc, +alto) 4 (+2 cor anglais) 4 (+bass clarinet) 4 (+contrabassoon) – 4441, 2 timpani, 2 percussion and strings | September 1991 | Henning Lohner, Wolfgang Becker-Carsten and the Kölner Rundfunk-Sinfonieorchester | All parts consist of series of single tones. The piece may be performed together with One^{11} (which is an abstract film). |
| 108 | 4 (+piccolo, +alto flute), 5 (+2 English horns), 5 (+2 Bass clarinets), 5 (+2 Contrabassoons) – 7551, 5 percussionists and strings (18-16-12-12-8) | April 1991 | Symphonie-Orchester des Süddeutschen Rundfunks | Similar in structure to a symphony, the work is in four movements (A, B, C, D) with silence occurring at the start, between each movement, and at the end. The percussion instruments are "distinguished from one another but not named" and should be "very resonant." The piece may also be performed as a cello concerto with One^{8} (109a), as a shō concerto with any three movements of One^{9} (109b), and as a double concerto for shō and five conch shells with any three movements of Two^{3} (110). The first performance of One^{8} and 108 (109a) was performed by the Stuttgart Radio Symphony Orchestra, November 30, 1991 with Michael Bach, cello soloist with curved bow. |
