= 27 minutes 10.554 seconds =

Composition by John Cage

27' 10.554"
- by John Cage
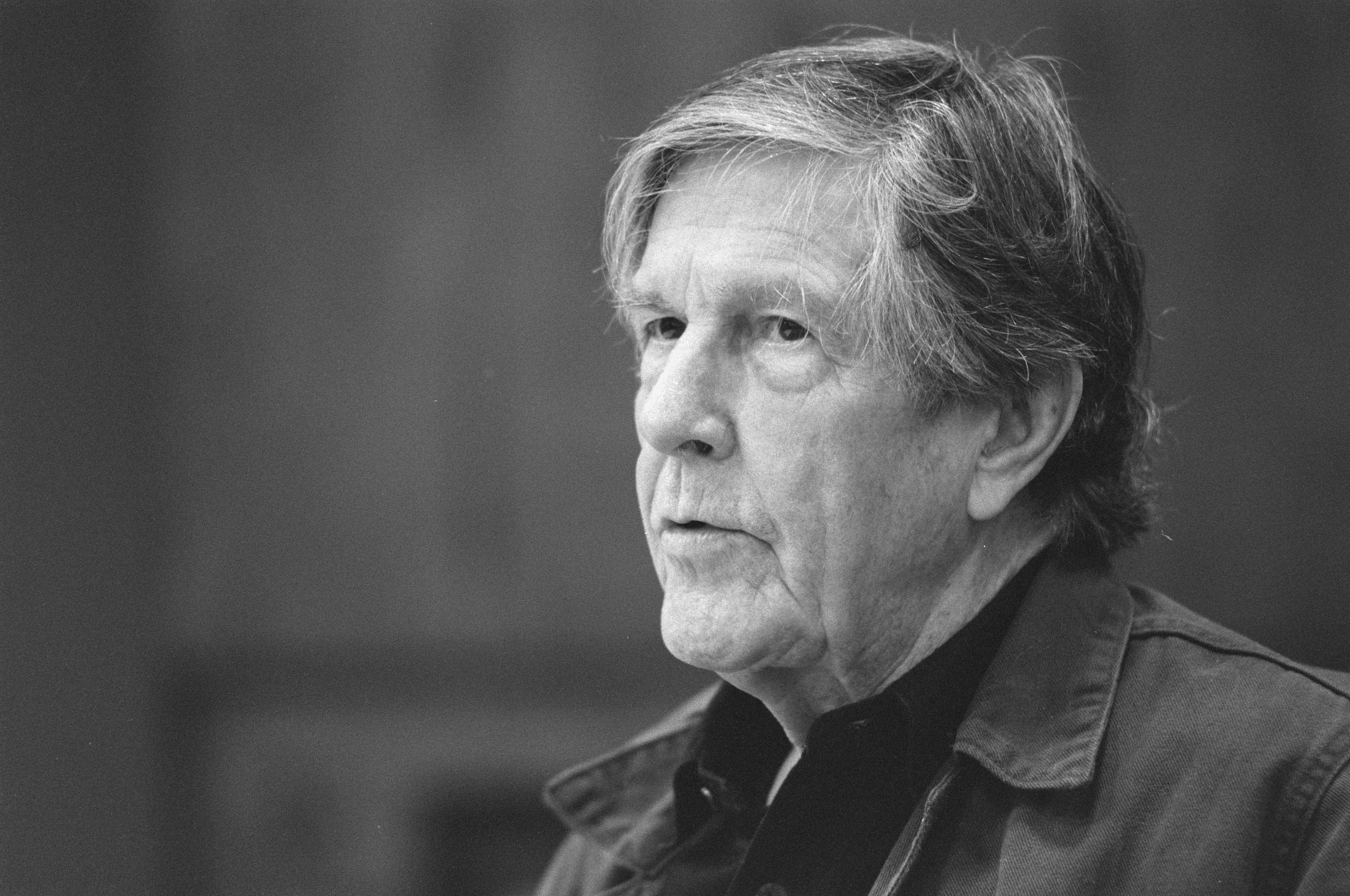
- John Cage
- Composed: 1956
- Performed: 1962 – Munich
- Published: 1960:
- Scoring: Percussionist, scoring ad libitum

27' 10.554" is a composition for percussion by American composer John Cage. It was finished in 1956.

== Background ==
=== The Ten Thousand Things ===
Initially entitled 27' 7.614", for a percussionist, it is the last work in The Ten Thousand Things project, an unfinished collection of works written by Cage between 1953 and 1956, which also included a collection of short pieces for panflute player, a piece for tape recorder, left unfinished in 1953, a piece for voice, also unfinished in 1953, 34' 46.776", for piano, finished in 1954, 31' 57.9864", for piano, finished in 1954, and 26' 01.41499", for a bow player, written in 1955. The original plan was to write a series of compositions for instruments and electronic devices that could be played one by one or superimposed one on top of the other.

The title was taken from Eastern philosophy, where that number is culturally significant (e. g., Ten thousand years), a culture which Cage was very fond of and referenced throughout his whole artistic career. The rhythmic structure of the work was meant to consist of a hundred musical phrases, each comprising a hundred sounds, which totals ten thousand sounds taking place.

Tao produced the One.

The One produced the two. The two produced the three.

And the three produced the ten thousand things.

— Lao Tzu, The Way of Lao Tzu

=== Composition ===
The composition process was largely based on random operations, much in the way the 5000-year-old Chinese technique of I Ching is devised. Most of the pieces Cage wrote in this period (including the ones from The Ten Thousand Things Project) approached random composition in the same way, in an attempt by Cage to remove himself from the creative process and allowing chance to take over. The piece was written in 1956 and published by Henmar Press in 1960, exclusively distributed by Edition Peters. It premiered in Munich on February 2, 1962.

== Structure ==
The piece is scored for one percussionist and has a total duration of 27 minutes and 10 seconds. The published score is a facsimile where each system consists of four lines: M, for Metal; W, for Wood; S, for Skin; and A, for All others (which includes electronic devices, mechanical arrangements, radios, whistles, etc.). Each line has different unspecified symbols, like dots and straight and curved lines, that the performer is mean to play ad libitum. Instrumentation is also entirely left to the performer. However, Cage specifically mentions that a "virtuoso performance" includes a "wide variety of instruments, beaters, sliding tones, and an exhaustive rather than conventional use of the instruments employed".

The score consists of 28 pages. Cage made a correspondence between time and space in the score so that one page equals one minute, with numbers above the systems being the seconds of the minute. Although the score includes the information needed by a performer to play the piece, Cage also implies that the performance can be carried out with the aid of a recording or rather as a recording by itself.

== Recordings ==
27' 10.554" is a Cage piece commonly performed by percussionists. Following is a list of recordings of the piece:

- Jonathan Faralli recorded the piece in 2011, in Montevarchi. The recording was released on CD by Brilliant Classics in 2012.
