= Marie Marchowsky =

American modern dancer and choreographer

- Born: 1916; The Bronx, New York City, United States
- Died: 1997 (aged 80–81); Manhattan, New York City, United States
- Occupations: Modern dancer, choreographer
- Known for: Work with the Martha Graham Dance Company

Marie Marchowsky (1916–1997) was an American modern dancer and choreographer who was one of the youngest dancers to train with modern pioneer Martha Graham.

== Early life ==
Marchowsky was born to two Russian immigrants and she grew up in The Bronx, New York. Her father was a pharmacist and her mother worked as a seamstress for additional income. Marchowsky's love for dance stemmed from an early age; enthralled by a ballet school near her house, she begged her mother to enroll her. Although her mother was not a fan of ballet and was a staunch supporter of Isadora Duncan, Marchowsky was allowed to practice at the ballet school until it was time for her to progress to dancing en pointe. At this time her mother pulled her from the school and took her to Anita Zahn to train in Duncan Dance at Carnegie Hall. However, it wasn't until Marchowsky attended a summer camp that she found the technique that would shape the rest of her career.

One of her dance counselors was Lily Mehlman, a company member with the Martha Graham Dance Company. Marchowsky continued her studies with Mehlman through the following winter, until at the age of 12, she attended a concert by Martha Graham, which enthralled the young dancer and exposed her to culture unlike she had seen before. Marchowsky convinced her counselor, Mehlman, to ask Graham for permission to train with the company and was allowed to on the condition that Marchowsky behaved in a mature fashion. Up until this point, the company allowed only adults and Marchowsky became the youngest student at Graham's school.

== The Martha Graham Company ==
After a few years of training, Marchowsky was asked by Graham to perform in her work Primitive Mysteries. She continued to balance her work with the company while attending high school. She danced with the Martha Graham company "from 1934 to 1940 in this pioneering era," performing in many other works with the company such as Celebrations.

As a Jewish girl, Marchowsky felt that Graham and her modern dance technique steeped her in culture. She once remarked, “All jewish people want their children to be cultured. To have culture, that is a tradition. It's a very deep tradition. I have known this to be so, I must say. I think perhaps because you had to be something. You were nothing as a Jew, nothing. You had to be something, you had to have brains or talent. Had to be professional, you were striving for the whole family, simply because they were so deprived of position by being a Jew…”

== Legacy ==
Though Marchowsky was profoundly shaped by Graham's technique and choreography, she eventually began to expand into her own choreographic ventures. Initially, she began going on demonstrations with choreographer, composer, and pianist, Louis Horst. She auditioned for the 92nd Street Y, a cultural and community center on the Upper East Side of Manhattan, New York, 92nd Street Y where she became a part of a group called "the audition winners" It was with this group that she began her foray into choreography. She was also involved in the New Dance Group which is an organization for dance that was created during a politically progressive time by artists that were committed and motivated by social movements. The organization put on festivals and concerts that Marchowsky participated in.

She did establish her own company, the Marie Marchowsky Dance Theatre Company, which made their Broadway debut in a concert at the New York Times Hall, showcasing works to include: Image of Obsession by Herbert Haufrecht, Foreboding by John Cage, Labyrinth by David Diamond, and seven solo personal works. One of her best known solos was entitled Ebb Tide with a score from Isaac Nemiroff. She continued teaching in New York at her own studio and became the "director of dance at Caltech in Pasadena, California." Marchowsky was known for her excellent technique, dynamics and her virtuosity as a solo performer.

Marchowsky died at 80 years old in Manhattan, New York.
