= A Year from Monday =

Book by John Cage

- 1969 edition
- Author: John Cage
- Publisher: Wesleyan University Press
- Publication date: 1967

A Year from Monday: New Lectures and Writings is a collection of essays, lectures and journal entries from 1961 to 1967 by American avant-garde composer John Cage (1912–1992), first published in 1967 by Wesleyan University Press. Its contents are:

- Foreword
- "Diary: How to Improve the World (you will only make matters worse)" (1965)
- "Diary: Emma Lake Music Workshop" (1965)
- "Seriously Comma" (1966)
- "Happy New Ears!" (1967)
- "Two Statements on Ives" (1967)
- "Mosaic" (1965)
- "Diary: Audience 1966" (1966)
- "Diary: How to Improve the World (you will only make matters worse)" (continued 1966)
- "26 Statements Re Duchamp" (1963)
- "Jasper Johns: Stories and Ideas" (1964)
- "Miró in Third Person: 8 Statements" (1967)
- "Nam June Paik: A Diary" (1965)
- "Where Do We Go from Here?" (1963, previously published under the title "Dance Perspectives")
- "Juilliard Lecture" (1967)
- "Lecture on Commitment" (1967)
- "Rhythm Etc." (1966)
- "How to Pass, Kick, Fall and Run" (1967)
- "Talk I" (1967)
- "Diary: How to Improve the World (you will only make matters worse)" (continued 1967)
- "Afterword" (1967)

== Reviews ==
Kirkus Reviews felt that the work fell somewhere between genius and idiosyncratic. It praised Cage as a humourist and felt his "prose style is the finest since Gertrude Stein".

Dennis, writing in-depth on the works in the journal Tempo, felt a significant focus of Cage's was the importance of living solely in the present. While noting the brilliance and entertainment of reading the various essays, he felt that facets of religious, philosophical and sociological analysis were scattered throughout and were well worth reading on that basis as well.

== See also ==
- List of compositions by John Cage
