= HPSCHD =

Composition for harpsichord and computer sounds (1969)

HPSCHD (pronounced as initials: eɪtʃ-piː-ɛs-siː-eɪtʃ-di:, although Cage himself said the title is "Harpsichord") is a composition for harpsichord and computer-generated sounds by American avant-garde composers John Cage (1912–1992) and Lejaren Hiller (1924–1994). It was written between 1967 and 1969 and was premiered on May 16, 1969, at the Experimental Music Studios at the University of Illinois at Urbana–Champaign.

== History of composition ==
As part of the commemoration of the University of Illinois one hundredth anniversary in 1967, Hiller, the head of the computer music department, invited Cage (then a Visiting Associate in the Center for Advanced Studies) to submit two works related to the field of computing technology and chance procedures. Together with a piece called Atlas Borealis with Ten Thunderclaps, Cage submitted the idea for HPSCHD, which had been commissioned by the Swiss harpsichord aficionado Antoinette Vischer. The long and complex compositional process also involved the technical assistance of Jim Cuomo, Laetitia Snow, James Grant Stroud, and Max Mathews.

== Premiere ==
HPSCHD premiered before an audience of 6000 on May 16, 1969, at the Assembly Hall of Urbana Campus, University of Illinois. Conceived as a highly immersive multimedia experience, the performance featured David Tudor, Antoinette Vischer, William Brooks, Ronald Peters, Yūji Takahashi, Neely Bruce and Philip Corner playing harpsichords whose sounds were captured and amplified, 208 tapes playing computer-generated sounds through 52 monaural tape players, and an array of movie and slide projectors projecting 6400 slides and 40 movies onto rectangular screens, on a 340-foot circular screen, and on the domed ceiling of the Assembly Hall. Many of these images, selected by Ron Nameth and Calvin Sumsion, were borrowed from NASA (the premiere was just a month prior to the first human Moon landing).

The performance lasted for about 5 hours, not intended as a static, unidirectional event, but as a hypnotic environment with the audience encouraged to "move in and out of the building, around the Hall, and through the performing area." During the premiere an image of Beethoven wearing a University of Illinois jersey with Cage's face on it was silkscreened onto paper tunics distributed to members of the audience (and then on audience members' garments, including T-shirts, once the supply of tunics ran out). Three large silkscreened posters were created for the event, two of which featured images chosen by chance operations similar to those used in the composition of the music. Some copies were sold to support the event, each for a different price established using an I Ching chart.3

== Analysis ==
HPSCHD is composed of 7 solo pieces for harpsichord and 52 computer-generated tapes. The harpsichord solos were created from randomly processed pieces by Mozart, Beethoven, Chopin, Schumann, Gottschalk, Busoni, Schoenberg, Cage and Hiller, rewritten using a FORTRAN computer program designed by Ed Kobrin based on the I Ching hexagrams. Cage had initially turned down the commission (stating that he hated harpsichords because they reminded him of sewing machines) but Hiller's proposal reignited his interest in the piece, which provided an interesting challenge for both Cage's chance experiments and Hiller's use of computer algorithms in musical composition.

Twenty-minute solos for one to seven amplified harpsichords and tapes for one to fifty-two amplified monaural machines to be used in whole or in part in any combination with or without interruptions, etc., to make an indeterminate concert of any agreed-upon length having two to fifty-nine channels with loud-speakers around the audience. [...] In addition to playing his own solo, each harpsichordist is free to play any of the others.

Following the debut at Urbana, Cage acknowledged the chaotic nature of the piece and the performance, explaining: "When I produce a happening, I try my best to remove intention in order that what is done will not oblige the listener in any one way. I don't think we're really interested in the validity of compositions any more. We're interested in the experiences of things."

== Recordings ==
HPSCHD was released by Nonesuch Records in 1969 on an LP that featured a 21-minute-long recording of HPSCHD on side A and Ben Johnston's String Quartet No. 2 on side B. Each of the first run of 10,000 copies of the LP included a unique 37 cm x 55 cm printout of a program called KNOBS, written by the composers to enhance the listening experience of the record. These printouts, executed on a CDC 6400 computer at the State University of New York at Buffalo, in April 1969, offered a series of randomly generated settings for volume, treble and bass for each channel at intervals of 5 seconds. The album was reissued on CD by Nonesuch in 1998.

A new version was released on CD in 2003 by the Electronic Music Foundation. The first edition of the CD included a set of fifteen cards with liner notes which the listener can arrange as a poster. The liner notes feature texts by Johanne Rivest, Bill Brooks, David Eisenman, Joel Chadabe, and Robert Conant. The harpsichord parts were recorded in 2000 at the Foundation For Baroque Music, Inc., Greenfield Center, NY.
