= Prepared piano =

Musical instrument

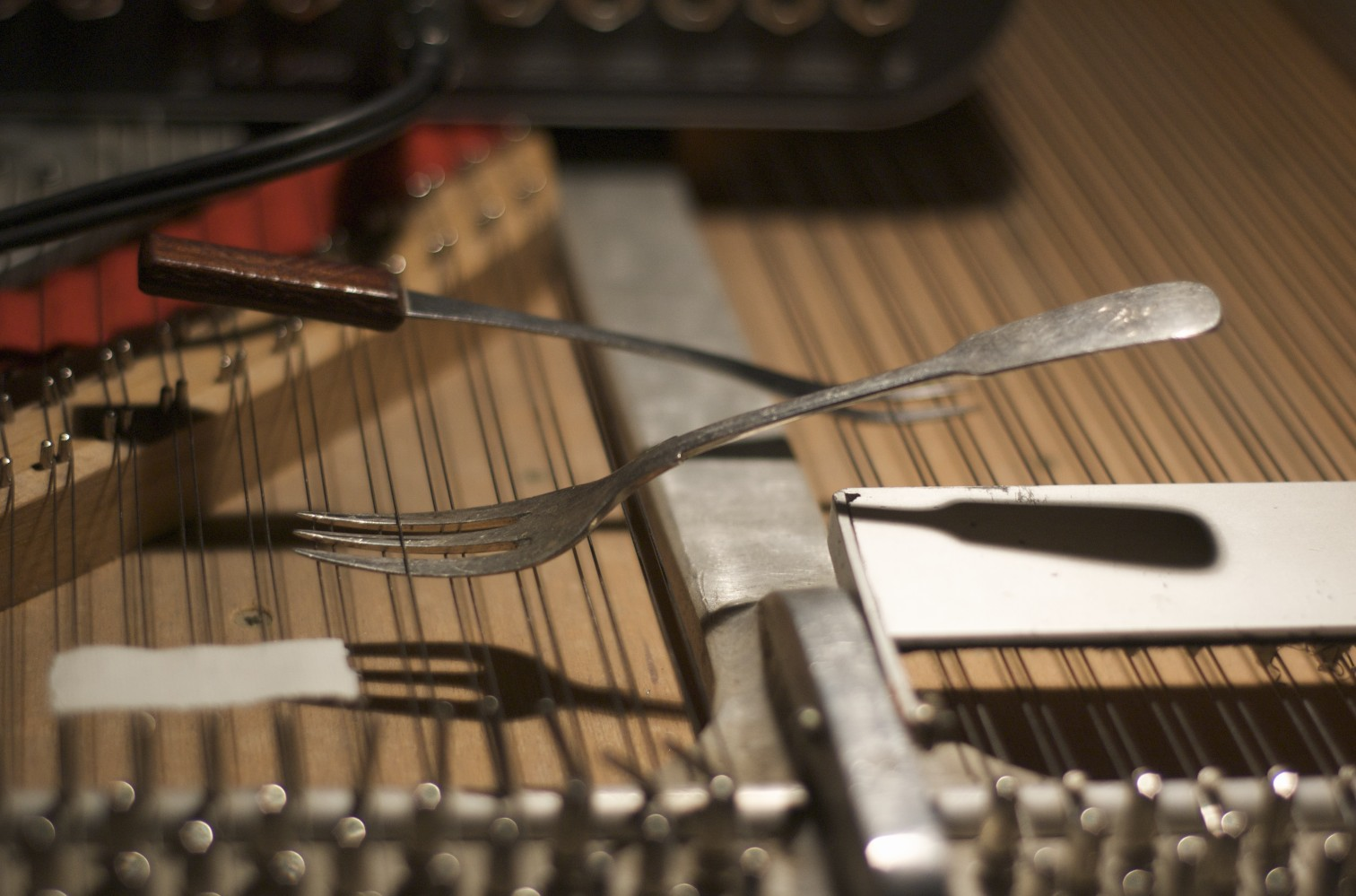
Andrea Neumann's preparations, where pieces of cutlery are placed between piano strings

Phillip Zoubek's prepared piano

A prepared piano is a piano that has had its sounds temporarily altered by placing bolts, screws, mutes, rubber erasers, and/or other objects on or between the strings. Its invention is usually traced to John Cage, who used the technique in his dance music for Bacchanale (1940), created for a performance in a Seattle venue that lacked sufficient space for a percussion ensemble. Cage has cited Henry Cowell as an inspiration for developing piano extended techniques, involving strings within a piano being manipulated instead of the keyboard. Typical of Cage's practice, as summed up in the Sonatas and Interludes (1946–1948), is that each key of the piano has its own characteristic timbre, and that the original pitch of the string will not necessarily be recognizable. Further variety is available with use of the una corda pedal.

Between 1950 and 1980, Ferrante & Teicher used partially prepared pianos for some of their tunes in their albums. Other musicians, such as Denman Maroney, use prepared piano for performances. Cor Fuhler and Roger Miller have developed their own ways of using prepared piano in their musical albums. Additionally, notable contributors to the subsequent repertoire include Lou Harrison, Pauline Oliveros, James Tenney, and Christian Wolff.

When a properly prepared piano has been "unprepared", it should be impossible for anyone to tell that it had ever been prepared. Changes causing less easily reversible damage can be served by permanently dedicating an instrument, such as the tack piano. Other techniques related to prepared piano include the Acoustisizer.

== Historical precedents ==
Cage frequently cited Henry Cowell (1897–1965) as the primary inspiration for the prepared piano. Cowell pioneered piano extended techniques for what he dubbed "string piano", involving reaching inside the piano and plucking, sweeping, scraping, thumping, and otherwise manipulating the strings directly, rather than using the keyboard. He developed these techniques in numerous pieces such as Aeolian Harp (1923) and The Banshee (1925). Pieces of paper were called for in several early 20th century works, the buzzing effect reminiscent of the parchment 'bassoon' pedal of early fortepianos. In his Ragamalika (1912–1922), based on the classical music of India, French composer Maurice Delage (1879–1961) calls for a piece of cardboard to be placed under the B♭ in the second line of the bass clef to dampen the sound, imitating the sound of an Indian drum.

In his Chôros No. 8, a 1925 work for large orchestra, Heitor Villa-Lobos instructs the 2nd pianist to insert pieces of paper between the strings Maurice Ravel's L'enfant et les sortilèges (1920-1925) calls for Luthéal, but allows piano with paper to substitute.

== John Cage ==
The invention of the "prepared piano", per se, is usually traced to John Cage. Cage first prepared a piano when he was commissioned to write music for Bacchanale, a dance by Syvilla Fort (its date is variously given as 1938 or 1940). For some time previously, Cage had been writing exclusively for a percussion ensemble, but the hall where Fort’s dance was to be staged had no room for a percussion group. The only instrument available was a single grand piano. After some consideration, Cage said that he realized it was possible "to place in the hands of a single pianist the equivalent of an entire percussion orchestra ... With just one musician, you can really do an unlimited number of things on the inside of the piano if you have at your disposal an exploded keyboard".

== Other composers, arrangers, performers, and compositions ==
- Ferrante & Teicher were an American piano duo who produced over a hundred albums of light classical and popular "easy listening" in their long careers (1947–1992). Between 1950 and 1980 they included partially prepared pianos on a number of their tunes to add percussive effects.
- On "All Tomorrow's Parties" from The Velvet Underground & Nico (1967), John Cale prepared his piano with a chain of paper clips.
- On his 1968 album Blues Roots, Dave Brubeck prepared a piano by laying copper strips across the strings to give the song "Blues Roots" a honky-tonk sound.
- Denman Maroney performs on what he has dubbed 'hyperpiano', which "involves stopping, sliding, bowing, plucking, striking and strumming the strings with copper bars, aluminum bowls, rubber blocks, plastic boxes and other household objects."
- Cor Fuhler pioneered many inside piano techniques during the 1980s and recorded his first prepared piano solo album 7CC IN IO on GeestGronden in 1995; recorded The Hands of Caravaggio with John Tilbury and M.I.M.E.O. on the USA label Erstwhile Records; and in 2007 he released Stengam on the French label Potlatch.
- Since 1982, Roger Miller has developed his own take on prepared piano in his work, initially on Mission of Burma's single "Trem II". Miller has since released many albums (on labels including Ace of Hearts, SST, New Alliance, Atavistic and Matador) incorporating this technique. His concert hall compositions since 2009 have often utilized prepared piano.
- On his 1975 album Another Green World, composer Brian Eno employed prepared piano on the track "Little Fishes". He also played it on David Bowie's Lodger (1979) album.
- Hauschka, aka Volker Bertelmann, employed prepared piano techniques in his album The Prepared Piano in 2005, as well as in his score for the 2021 film Stowaway.
- Several Aphex Twin compositions from the 2001 album Drukqs make use of prepared piano.
- The third movement of John Mackey's wind symphony, Wine-Dark Sea, utilizes piano prepared with glass rods. The combination of the glass rods, as well as a spoon scraped over the strings, work to create a dissonant "fingernails on chalkboard," setting the scene of Odysseus in the underworld.
- Kristin Hayter, while on tour under the moniker Lingua Ignota, has performed on a piano prepared with forks, clothes pins, fishing wire with heavy rosin, bells, chains, and a clamp lamp. Her 2023 album Saved! (released under the alias Reverend Kristin Michael Hayter) was performed almost exclusively on a piano "prepared with bells and chains".
- Kelly Moran, an American composer and producer makes extensive use of prepared piano techniques on her 2017 album Bloodroot.

== Related techniques ==
=== Tack piano ===
Strictly speaking, a tack piano is not a prepared piano, since

- The technique involves placing objects between or on the strings or hammers of a piano;
- The strings' original pitches remain perceptible; and
- The preparation is not fully reversible.

Although the tacks can be removed from the hammers, inserting them causes permanent damage to the felt; for this and other reasons, the use of tacks is generally discouraged by piano technicians.

=== Acoustisizer ===
The Acoustisizer is an electroacoustic musical instrument built from a small grand piano with built-in speakers, magnetic guitar pickups, PZMs, and prepared piano strings. It was built as part of a graduate thesis project at California State University Dominguez Hills by Bob Fenger (1983), a student of Richard Bunger (author of the Well Prepared Piano). Speakers are built into the bottom of the instrument, redirecting its own amplified sound back onto the sounding board, with strings and magnetic pickups creating an amplitude intensity loop, which in turn drives and vibrates suspended kinetic oscillators (assemblages of vibration sensitive materials). Secondary control parameters allow extraction of vibration and sound phenomena from the kinetic oscillators through a series of proximity microphones and PZMs (piezo-electric contact mics). An article by the inventor was published in Experimental Musical Instruments Magazine April 1991, Nicasio, California. It includes pictures of the kinetic oscillators and stages of the construction process, including an underbody view of the speaker system configuration.

== See also ==
- Circuit bending
- The Finchcocks collection
- Fortepiano
- Luthéal
- Prepared guitar
- Prepared harp
- String piano
