= Mesostic =

Type of poem or text

A mesostic is a poem or other text arranged so that a vertical phrase intersects lines of horizontal text. It is similar to an acrostic, but with the vertical phrase intersecting somewhere in the midst of the line, as opposed to the beginning of each line.

The practice of using index words to select pieces from a preexisting text was developed by Jackson Mac Low as "diastics". It was used extensively by the experimental composer John Cage.

== Types ==
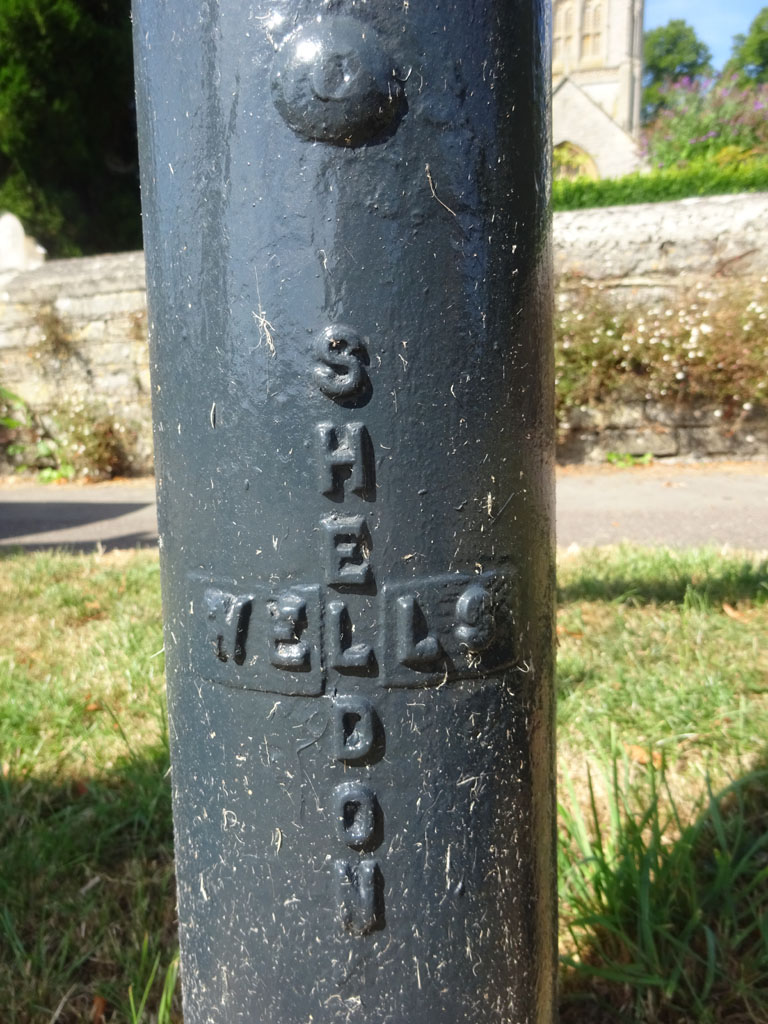
A mesostic maker's mark on a fingerpost

There are two types of mesostic:

- In a fifty-percent mesostic, according to Andrew Culver (John Cage's assistant), "Between any two [capitalized] letters, you can't have the second [letter]."
- In a one-hundred-percent mesostic, "Between any two [capitalized] letters, you can't have either [letter]."

An example of a one-hundred-percent mesostic:

        KITCHEN

  let us maKe
      of thIs
      modesT
        plaCe
    a room Holding
tons of lovE
       (&, Naturally, much good food, too)

It qualifies as a one-hundred-percent mesostic because there is no k or i in the text between the capital K of line 1 and the capital I of line 2 –

  let us maKe
      of thIs

– no i or t between the capital I and T –

      of thIs
      modesT

– and so on.

== See also ==
- Backronym
- Word square
