= Indeterminacy (music) =

Technique in musical composition

Indeterminacy is a composing approach in which some aspects of a musical work are left open to chance or to the interpreter's free choice. John Cage, a pioneer of indeterminacy, defined it as "the ability of a piece to be performed in substantially different ways".

== Definition ==
Describing indeterminacy, composer John Cage said: "My intention is to let things be themselves." Cage initially defined indeterminacy as "the ability of a piece to be performed in substantially different ways". Bryan Simms thus conflates indeterminacy with what Cage called chance composition when he claims that "Any part of a musical work is indeterminate if it is chosen by chance, or if its performance is not precisely specified. The former case is called 'indeterminacy of composition'; the latter is called 'indeterminacy of performance'."

== History ==
The earliest significant use of music indeterminacy features is found in many of the compositions of American composer Charles Ives in the early 20th century. Henry Cowell adopted Ives's ideas during the 1930s, in such works as the Mosaic Quartet (String Quartet No. 3, 1934), which allows the players to arrange the fragments of music in a number of different possible sequences. Cowell also used specially devised notations to introduce variability into the performance of a work, sometimes instructing the performers to improvise a short passage or play ad libitum. John Cage is regarded as a pioneer of indeterminacy in music. Beginning in the early 1950s, the term came to refer to the (mostly American) movement which grew up around Cage. This group included the other members of the so-called New York School: Earle Brown, Morton Feldman and Christian Wolff. Others working in this way included the Scratch Orchestra in the United Kingdom (1968 until the early 1970s) and the Japanese composer Toshi Ichiyanagi (born 1933). In Europe, following the introduction of the expression "aleatory music" by Werner Meyer-Eppler, the French composer Pierre Boulez was largely responsible for popularizing the term.

In 1958 Cage gave two lectures in Europe, the first at Darmstadt, titled simply "Indeterminacy", the second in Brussels called "Indeterminacy: New Aspect of Form in Instrumental and Electronic Music" (given again in an expanded form in 1959 at Teacher's College, Columbia). This second lecture consisted of a number of short stories (originally 30, expanded to ninety in the second version), each story read by Cage in exactly one minute; because of this time limit, the speed of Cage's delivery varied enormously. The second performance and a subsequent recording contained music, also by Cage, played by David Tudor at the same time. Subsequently, Cage added still more stories, and published a selection of them, partly as an article, "Indeterminacy", and partly as scattered interludes throughout his first collection of writings, Silence.

Between 2007 and 2013, the Dutch artist Iebele Abel developed an electronic instrument called Real-time Indeterminate Synthetic Music Feedback (RT-ISMF). The instrument was designed for empirical research on subjective experiences induced by real-time synthesized music, based on the output of electronic random number generators. The basic idea of this approach was that indeterminate music might evoke unique and exceptional human experience.

== Classification ==
Indeterminate or chance music can be divided into three groups: (1) the use of random procedures to produce a determinate, fixed score, (2) mobile form, and (3) indeterminate notation, including graphic notation and texts. The first group includes scores in which the chance element is involved only in the process of composition, so that every parameter is fixed before their performance. In John Cage's Music of Changes (1951), the process of composition involved applying decisions made using the I Ching, a Chinese classic text that is commonly used as a divination system. The I Ching was applied to large charts of sounds, durations, dynamics, tempo and densities. Cage himself, however, regarded Music of Changes as a determinate work, because it is completely fixed from one performance to another. Iannis Xenakis used probability theories to define some microscopic aspects of Pithoprakta (1955–56), that is the Greek for "actions by means of probability". This work contains four sections, characterized by textural and timbral attributes, such as glissandi and pizzicati. At the macroscopic level, the sections are designed and controlled by the composer, but the single components of sound are generated by mathematical theories. See: stochastic music.

In the second type of indeterminate music (the only type of indeterminate music according to Cage's definition), chance elements involve the performance. Notated events are provided by the composer, but their arrangement is left to the determination of the performer. According to Cage, examples include Johann Sebastian Bach's The Art of Fugue, Morton Feldman's Intersection 3, Earle Brown's Four Systems, and Christian Wolff's Duo for Pianists II. A form of limited indeterminacy was used by Witold Lutosławski (beginning with Jeux vénitiens in 1960–61), where extensive passages of pitches and rhythms are fully specified, but the rhythmic coordination of parts within the ensemble is subject to an element of chance. Earle Brown's Twenty-Five Pages, uses 25 unbound pages, and called for anywhere between one and 25 pianists. The score allowed the performers to arrange the pages in whatever order they saw fit. Also, the pages were notated symmetrically and without clefs so that the top and bottom orientation is reversible.

"Open form" is a term sometimes used for "mobile" or "polyvalent" musical forms, where the order of movements or sections is indeterminate or left up to the performer. Roman Haubenstock-Ramati composed a series of influential "mobiles" such as Interpolation (1958).

However, "open form" in music is also used in the sense defined by the art historian Heinrich Wölfflin (1915) to mean a work which is fundamentally incomplete, represents an unfinished activity, or points outside of itself. In this sense, a "mobile form" can be either "open" or "closed". An example of a "dynamic, closed" mobile musical composition is Karlheinz Stockhausen's Zyklus (1959), Terry Riley's In C (1964) was composed of 53 short sequences; each member of the ensemble can repeat a given sequence as many times as desired before going on to the next, making the details of each performance of In C unique. However, because the overall course is fixed, it is a closed form.

The greatest degree of indeterminacy is reached by the third type of indeterminate music, in graphic score pieces, in which the music is represented using symbols and illustrations suggesting how a work can be performed. Hans-Christoph Steiner's score for Solitude, created using Pure Data's data structures. This notation may be, like music on traditional staves, a time-pitch graph system. Earle Brown's December 1952 consists purely of horizontal and vertical lines varying in width, spread out over the page; it is a landmark piece in the history of graphic notation of music. The role of the performer is to interpret the score visually and translate the graphical information to music. In Brown's notes on the work he even suggests that one consider this 2D space as 3D and imagine moving through it. Cornelius Cardew's Treatise is a graphic musical score comprising 193 pages of lines, symbols, and various geometric or abstract shapes that generally eschew conventional musical notation. Although the score allows for absolute interpretive freedom (no one interpretation will sound like another), the work is not normally played spontaneously, as Cardew had previously suggested that performers devise in advance their own rules and methods for interpreting and performing the work. There are, however, infinite possibilities for the interpretation of Treatise that fall within the implications of the piece and general principles of experimental music performance in the late 1960s, including presentation as visual art and map-reading

== Discography ==
- Cage, John. 1959. Indeterminacy: New Aspects of Form in Instrumental and Electronic Music. Ninety Stories by John Cage, with Music. John Cage, reading; David Tudor, music (Cage, Solo for Piano from Concert for Piano and Orchestra, with Fontana Mix). Folkways FT 3704 (2 LPs). Reissued 1992 on Smithsonian/Folkways CD DF 40804/5 (2 CDs).

== See also ==
- Process music
- Aleatoric music
