= Cheap Imitation =

Composition for solo piano by John Cage (1969)

Cheap Imitation is a piece for solo piano by John Cage, composed in 1969. It is an indeterminate piece created using the I Ching and based, rhythmically, on Socrate by Erik Satie.

== History of composition ==
Like numerous other works by Cage, Cheap Imitation was a result of his collaboration with Merce Cunningham's dance company. However, in this case the original choreography relied not on Cage's music, but on a piano arrangement of Erik Satie's symphonic drama Socrate. In 1947 Cunningham choreographed a dance based on the first movement of Satie's work, and Cage provided a two-piano transcription of the music (since Cunningham's dances were usually accompanied by piano only). In 1968 it was decided to expand the choreography by two movements, based on the remaining two movements of the Satie work. Cage, who was at the time working on HPSCHD, a large multimedia work, requested help of an acquaintance from the University of Illinois, Arthur Maddox, and together they completed a two-piano arrangement of the remaining two movements. The new choreography was to be premiered in early 1970.

However, in December 1969 Cage received news from Satie's publisher, Éditions Max Eschig, that he had been refused the rights to perform the piece, although Eschig hadn't even requested to see the transcription. Because the choreography was based on the rhythms and structure of Socrate, Cage could not simply compose a new piece of music. He decided to imitate Satie's work in a piano solo. Cage titled the result Cheap Imitation, and Cunningham responded in kind, naming the choreography Second Hand.

Cheap Imitation became the last work Cage performed in public as a pianist: arthritis prevented him from doing any more performances. Nevertheless, even though his hands were painfully swollen, he still played it during the 1970s. Cage grew more and more fascinated with the piece, producing transcriptions for orchestra of a minimum of 24 performers and a maximum of 95 (1972) and for solo violin (1977) at the request of the violinist Paul Zukofsky (who in 1989–90 also assisted Cage in completing the Freeman Etudes, which had been started in 1977–80). The orchestral versions, however, were not performed until much later, because the musicians refused to rehearse and would subsequently discover the piece was too difficult for them.

Cheap Imitation became something of a departure for Cage, because it was his first "proper" composition, in the old sense of the word, since 1962. Furthermore, the open declaration of Cage's own feelings (about Satie's work) was something very unusual for his work, which was, since the late 1940s, almost entirely impersonal. Cage himself was well aware of the contradiction between the rest of his works and Cheap Imitation:

In the rest of my work, I'm in harmony with myself ... But Cheap Imitation clearly takes me away from all that. So if my ideas sink into confusion, I owe that confusion to love. ... Obviously, Cheap Imitation lies outside of what may seem necessary in my work in general, and that's disturbing. I’m the first to be disturbed by it.

Cage's fondness for the work resulted in a recording of him performing it in 1976 – a rare occurrence, given Cage's negative attitude to recordings.

== Analysis ==
Cheap Imitation has three parts consisting almost exclusively of a single melodic line, with occasional doublings. The rhythmic structure of the phrases is based on Satie's original, usually on the vocal line, occasionally on the orchestral parts. The pitches were determined using chance operations with the I Ching, through the following questions:

1. Which of the seven modes, if we take as modes the seven scales beginning on white notes and remaining on white notes, which of those am I using?
2. Which of the twelve possible chromatic transpositions am I using?
3. For this phrase for which this transposition of this mode will apply, which note am I using of the seven to imitate the note that Satie wrote?

Cage observed phrase and note repeats present in Satie's melodies, adding them to his imitation. The use of modes was unusual in that Cage used chromatic transpositions; the composer called Cheap Imitation a chromatic modal piece.

The violin version, completed in 1977, was a collaboration with Paul Zukofsky. This transcription is transposed a major third higher than the original (otherwise several notes would be out of range of the instrument) and is identical to it, except for a few passages.

Cage would subsequently write several more pieces based on other composers' works, similarly using chance procedures to alter the originals. These include several solos from Song Books (1970), "harmonies" from Apartment House 1776 (1976), Some of "The Harmony of Maine" (1978) and Hymns and Variations (1979).

== Editions ==
- Original version: Edition Peters 6805. (c) 1970 by Henmar Press.
- Solo violin version: Edition Peters 66754. (c) 1977 by Henmar Press.
- Orchestral versions: Edition Peters 6805 AR/BR/CR. (c) 1972 by Henmar Press.

== Notes ==
=== Sources ===
- Cage, John. 1973. M: Writings '67–'72. Middletown, Connecticut: Wesleyan University Press. ISBN 0-8195-6035-9
- Fetterman, William. 1996. John Cage's Theatre Pieces: Notations and Performances. New York: Routledge. ISBN 3-7186-5643-4
- Kostelanetz, Richard. 2003. Conversing with John Cage. New York: Routledge. ISBN 0-415-93792-2
- Pritchett, James. 1993. The Music of John Cage. Cambridge and New York: Cambridge University Press. ISBN 0-521-56544-8
- Pritchett, James. 1994. "The Completion of John Cage's Freeman Etudes". Perspectives of New Music 32, no. 2 (Summer): 264–270.
- Pritchett, James. 2004. "John Cage: Imitations/Transformations". In James Pritchett, Writings on John Cage (and others). (Online resource, accessed 5 June 2008)
