= Etudes Australes =

The cover of the first recording of Etudes Australes features the star maps used to compose the piece and the rubber wedges necessary during the performance.

Etudes Australes is a set of etudes for piano solo by John Cage, composed in 1974–75 for Grete Sultan. It comprises 32 indeterminate pieces written using star charts as source material. The etudes, conceived as duets for two independent hands, are extremely difficult to play. They were followed by two more collections of similarly difficult works: Freeman Etudes for violin (1977–90) and Etudes Boreales (1978) for cello, or piano, or both together.

== History of composition ==
Cage wrote Etudes Australes for pianist and friend Grete Sultan, whom he had known since 1946. When Cage found out that Grete Sultan was working on his Music of Changes, a piece which involved hitting the piano with beaters and hands, he offered to write some new music for her, because to him "it didn't seem [right] that an aging lady should hit the piano" (Sultan turned 68 in 1974). Cage started working in January 1974 and finished the etudes in 1975.

The pieces are built on two basic ideas. The first is writing duets for independent hands, inspired by the way Sultan played. Cage made a catalogue of what triads, quatrads (four-note aggregates) and quintads (five-note aggregates) could be played by a single hand without the other assisting it; overall some 550 four- and five-note chords were available for each hand. The second idea was to use star charts as source material, as Cage had already done with the orchestral Atlas Eclipticalis in 1961 and with Song Books in 1970. This time Cage used the maps in Atlas Australis, an atlas of the southern sky by Antonín Bečvář, which he acquired in Prague in 1964.

The process of composition ran as follows. First, Cage put a transparent strip of about three-quarter inch over the maps. The width of the strip limited the number of stars used. Within this width Cage was able to discern the twelve tones of the octave. Then through chance operations using the I Ching, he transferred these tones to the available octaves for the left and right hands. The resulting notes reflect only the horizontal positions of the stars, and not all stars are used, because the maps used a variety of colors, and Cage's chance operations limited the choices every time to specific colors. In the end Cage would have a string of notes and ask the I Ching which of them are to remain single tones and which are to become parts of aggregates. In the first etude this question is answered by a single number, in the second by two numbers, etc. So as the etudes progress, there are more and more aggregates: in the first, most sounds are single tones, in the final, thirty-second etude, roughly half of the sounds are aggregates. The aggregates themselves were selected from the list of available aggregates, described above. (Note: Descriptions of the method given in Kostelanetz 2003, 92, Nicholls 2002, 139, and also Kostelanetz n.d.. The latter are quoted in Dettmar 1992, 290.) Due to health problems, Cage himself was unable to prepare the manuscript; this was done for him by Carlo Carnevali (etudes I–VIII) and Wilmia Polnauer (etudes IX–XXXII).

For Cage the resulting etudes represented certain political and social views. Collecting and using the aggregates for independent hands was particularly important, because according to Cage, it

permitted the writing of a music which was not based on harmony, but it permitted harmonies to enter into such a nonharmonic music. How could you express that in political terms? It would permit that attitude expressed socially. It would permit institutions or organizations, groups of people, to join together in a world which was not nationally divided.

Furthermore, the immense complexity of the music also had a social function. "I'm interested in the use of intelligence and the solution of impossible problems. And that's what these Etudes [Australes] are all about"; and the difficulty would ensure that "a performance would show that the impossible is not impossible."

=== Reception ===
Grete Sultan was enthusiastic about the prospect of Etudes Australes and after playing more and more of Cage's new etudes in public, she recorded the complete cycle in 1978 (books 1 and 2) and 1982 (books 3 and 4). The premiere of all 32 Etudes Australes did not take place until April 1982 during the Wittener Tage für neue Kammermusik in Witten/Germany, when the 75-year-old Grete Sultan performed the complete cycle to international acclaim. Cage had received letters from virtuoso pianists from all over the world expressing interest in the etudes; examples include Marianne Schroeder and Roger Woodward. For violinist Paul Zukofsky Etudes Australes signalled Cage's return to conventional notation, and he commissioned the composer to write a similar cycle for the violin. Also, in 1978 Cage wrote a small set of etudes for piano, or cello, or both together, Etudes Boreales, which also utilized star charts as basic material.

European critic Heinz-Klaus Metzger was thrilled by the collection and told Cage that these etudes were composed not by Cage but by God, alluding to the stars from which the collection is derived. A critic for The New York Times made a similar observation, suggesting that if Etudes Australes were to last beyond Cage's life, they would do so because of the stars themselves. Negative reviews included, for example, one by David Burge, pianist and piano professor at the Eastman School of Music. Reviewing the then recently published edition of Etudes Australes in 1977, Burge doubted the possibility of performance and wrote that "even if a performance were possible, ... it would be more interesting to look at, rather than listen to, this music." Today, the work is still controversial. The Washington Post staff writer Tim Page, writing 6 years after Cage's death, dismissed the work as "an interesting idea, but a lousy piece, as it would have had to be", whereas a review of Steffen Schleiermacher's 2001 recording of the cycle in The Guardian is more neutral and Jed Distler's review of the same record at Classics Today is very well-disposed towards the piece.

== Structure ==
Etudes Australes comprise 32 etudes grouped in 4 books of 8 etudes each. The pieces are arranged in order of complexity of the materials—single tones and aggregates—involved, from simple (etude 1, single tones) to complex (etude 32, potentially half single tones, other half aggregates). The music is written on four staves: the upper two for the right hand, the lower two for the left. The hands are forbidden to assist each other. There are no barlines, and no traditional note values. Just two types of notes are used, closed and open noteheads. An open note is to be held as long as possible beyond the succeeding closed note (if there are many closed notes, a pedal-like notation indicates where the open note may be released). Aggregates appear as notes written with a stem: while an ordinary closed or open note's position in time is indicated by the center of the note head, the position in time of an aggregate is indicated by the stem. In later etudes certain passages are too dense to be included on the page; such passages are indicated by a beam with stems (referring to the rhythm of the passage) and a capital letter which refers to the Appendix. Each etude includes several keys that are to be depressed prior to playing, and held down using a rubber wedge.

Beginning of Etude 8, Book I
First recording by Grete Sultan, the dedicatee of the work

The beginning of Etude 8, Book I. The top two staves are for the right hand, the lower two are for the left hand. Diamond-shape notes indicate the notes that are to be held depressed by rubber wedges during the performance of this etude.

The pieces are notoriously difficult to play. The performer has to learn a specific technique to play "duets for two independent hands" (which even involves a particular sitting position;) also, because both hands' ranges cover the entire keyboard, the hands are continually crossing. There are no tempi specified, no dynamics and no pedal indications; all of these are left to the performer to decide on. To facilitate matters somewhat, every etude occupies exactly two pages of the score, so there is no need to turn the page.

== Editions ==
- Edition Peters 6816 a/b/c/d. 1975 by Henmar Press.

== Recordings ==
Although individual etudes have appeared on compilations, the complete cycle has only been recorded four times. This section lists, in chronological order, only the complete recordings. Years of recording are given, not years of release. Catalogue numbers are indicated for the latest available CD versions. For the complete discography with reissues and partial recordings listed, see the link to the John Cage database below.

- Grete Sultan – 1978–82, "Etudes Australes (complete)". Wergo. WER 61522.
- Claudio Crismani – 1994–96, "John Cage: Etudes Australes". Prestige 13.
- Steffen Schleiermacher – 2001, "John Cage: Complete Piano Music Vol. 9". MDG 613 0795-2. (3CD, part of John Cage: Complete Piano Works 18-CD series)
- Sabine Liebner – 2011, "Etudes Australes (complete)". Wergo. WER 67402.

== Notes and references ==
Notes

=== Sources ===
- Burge, David (March 1977). "Review of Etudes Australes, Books 1–2; 3–4 by John Cage". Notes. 2nd series. 33 (3): 690–692. doi:10.2307/897509. JSTOR 897509.
- Cage, John (1979). Empty Words: Writings '73–'78. Middletown, Connecticut: Wesleyan University Press. ISBN 0-8195-6067-7.
- Cage, John (1985). Etudes Boreales and Ryoanji (jacket notes). New York: Mode 1/2.
- Cage, John (1996). Joan Retallack (ed.). Musicage: Cage Muses on Words, Art, Music. Hanover, New Hampshire, and London: University Press of New England for Wesleyan University Press. ISBN 0-8195-5285-2. Reprinted: Hanover, New Hampshire: University Press of New England, 1997. ISBN 0-8195-6311-0
- Clements, Andrew (2 August 2002). "Cage: Etudes Australes (Steffen Schleiermacher DG Scene (three CDs))". The Guardian.
- Dettmar, Kevin J. H. (1992). "'Working in Accord with Obstacles': A Postmodern Perspective on Joyce's 'Mythical Method'". In Kevin J. H. Dettmar (ed.). Rereading the New: A Backward Glance at Modernism. Ann Arbor: University of Michigan Press. pp. 277–296. ISBN 0-472-10290-7.
- Distler, Jed. "John Cage: Complete Piano Music Vol. 9". Classics Today.
- Duckworth, William (1999). Talking Music: Conversations with John Cage, Philip Glass, Laurie Anderson, and 5 Generations of American Experimental Composers. Perseus Books Group. ISBN 0-306-80893-5.
- Kostelanetz, Richard (n.d.). Etudes Australes for piano (Complete) (Grete Sultan (1978–1982) jacket notes). Wergo. 61522.
- Kostelanetz, Richard (2003). Conversing with John Cage. New York: Routledge. ISBN 0-415-93792-2.
- Nicholls, David (2002). The Cambridge Companion to John Cage. Cambridge Companions to Music. Cambridge and New York: Cambridge University Press. ISBN 0-521-78348-8.
- Page, Tim (16 August 1998). "American Composers: John Cage: The Avatar of Avant". The Washington Post.
- Perloff, Marjorie; Junkerman, Charles (1994). John Cage: Composed in America. Chicago: University of Chicago Press. ISBN 0-226-66056-7.
- Revill, David (1993). The Roaring Silence: John Cage – a Life. Arcade Publishing. ISBN 978-1-55970-220-1.
