= Antonín Bečvář =

Czech astronomer (1901–1965)

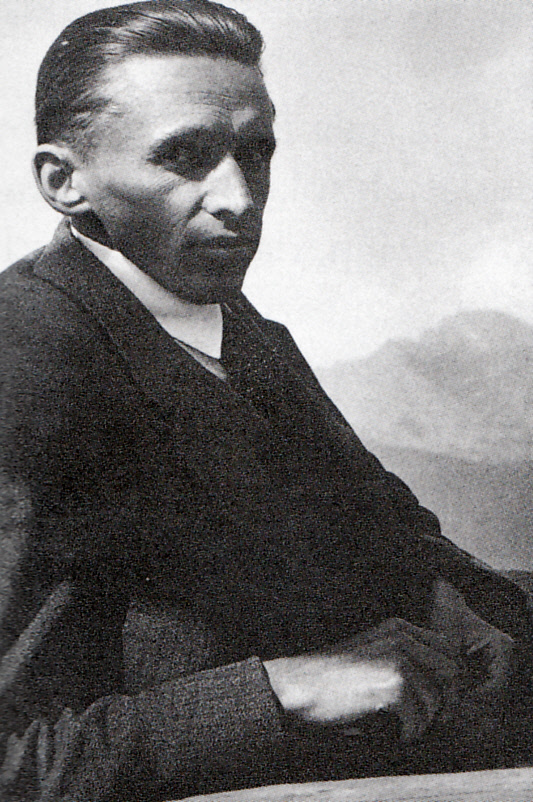

Antonín Bečvář (Czech pronunciation: [ˈantoɲiːn ˈbɛtʃvaːr̝̊]; 10 June 1901 – 10 January 1965) was a Czechoslovak astronomer.

== Biography ==
He was born and died in Stará Boleslav. Among his chief achievements is the foundation of the Skalnaté Pleso Observatory and the discovery of the comet C/1947 F2 (Bečvář) (also known by the designations 1947 III and 1947c). His lifelong illness led him to the High Tatras where he founded the observatory.

Bečvář is particularly important for his star charts: he led the compilation of the Atlas Coeli Skalnate Pleso (1951), published by Sky Publishing Corporation as the Skalnate Pleso Atlas of the Heavens, which was the state-of-the-art atlas of its kind until Wil Tirion's "Sky Atlas 2000.0" in 1981. A dozen star names in the atlas are of unknown origin, no connection to any language or previous source has been discovered despite an extensive search.

He also compiled Atlas eclipticalis, 1950.0 (1958), Atlas borealis 1950.0 (1962), and Atlas australis 1950.0 (1964).

The asteroid 4567 Bečvář and the crater Bečvář on the Moon were named in his honour. American Avant-garde composer John Cage used Bečvář's star charts as the basis of several works: Atlas Eclipticalis (1961–1962), Etudes Australes (1974–1975), Etudes Boreales (1978) and Freeman Etudes (1977–1980, 1989–1990).
