= Apartment House 1776 =

1976 composition by John Cage

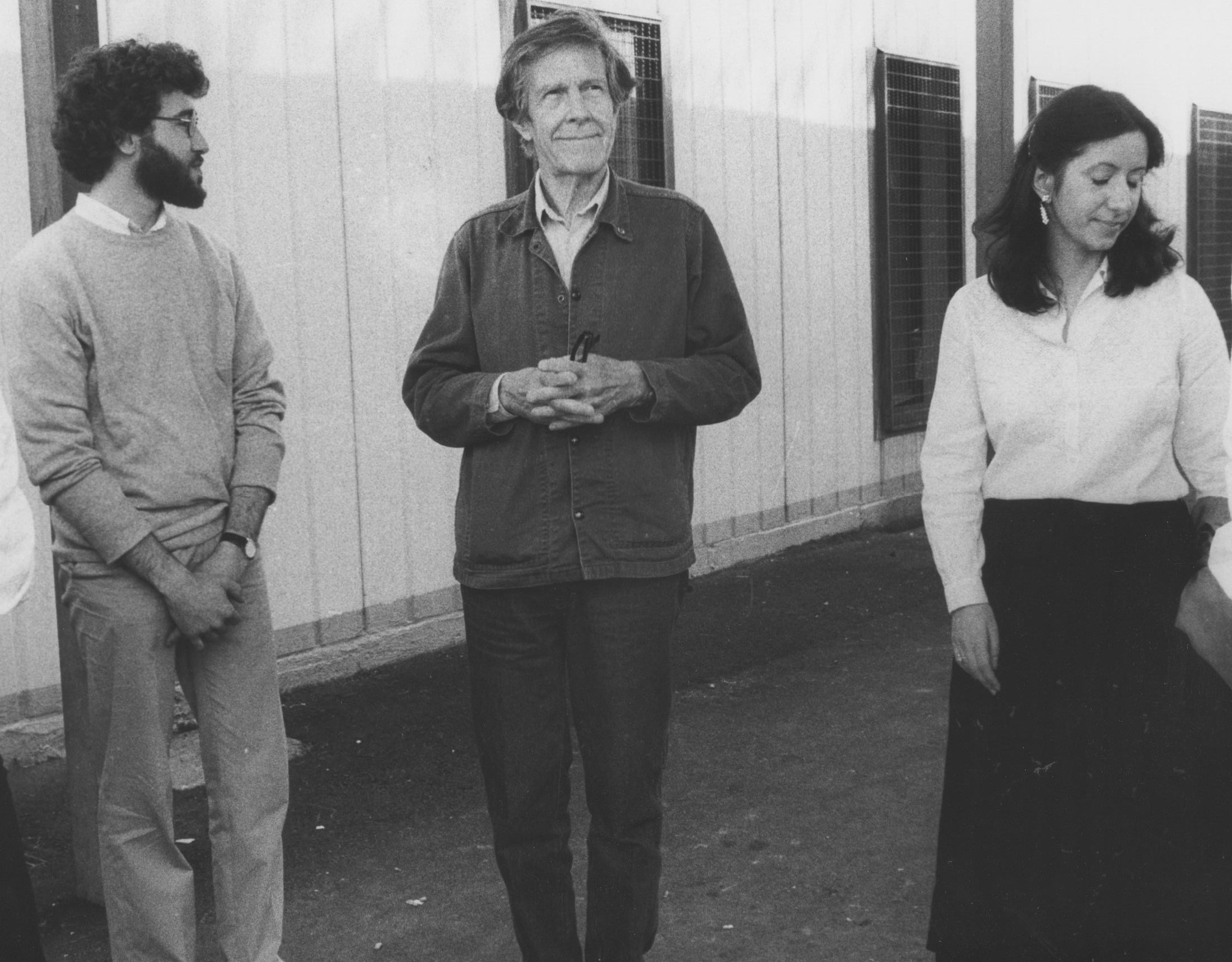
Giulio Castagnoli, John Cage, and Luisa Castellani in 1984

Apartment House 1776 is a 1976 composition by the American composer John Cage, composed for the United States Bicentennial and premiered by six orchestras across the country in 1976. The work was commissioned jointly by the orchestras of Boston, Chicago, Cleveland, Los Angeles, New York, and Philadelphia. In these performances, the work was performed together with Cage's 1975–76 orchestral work Renga.

== Structure ==
Following Cage's Musicircus principle (featuring what he called a "multiplicity of centers"), the work calls for four solo vocalists, each representing a different religious tradition in the United States: Protestant, Sephardic, Native American, and African American. The singers, who represent the four religious traditions practiced at the U.S.'s founding in 1776, select authentic songs from their respective traditions and sing them without attempting to match them to those of the other singers.

The soloists for the original performances were Helen Schneyer (Protestant), Nico Castel (Sephardic), Swift Eagle (Native American – Apache and Santo Domingo Pueblo), and Jeanne Lee (African American). The original performances were conducted by Seiji Ozawa (Boston), Pierre Boulez (New York) and Zubin Mehta (Los Angeles) .

The singers are accompanied by versions of anthems and congregational music written by composers who were at least 20 years old at the time of the American Revolution, which Cage recomposed by means of chance operations. The composers whose works are so used include William Billings, James Lyon, Jacob French, Andrew Law, and Supply Belcher. In addition, Cage provides four marches for solo drums (transcribed by James Barnes from Benjamin Clark's Drum Book of 1797) and 14 tunes for melody instruments, which are based on dance or military tunes of the period.

== Recordings ==
- 1994 – John Cage: Orchestral Works I (Mode)

== See also ==
- List of compositions by John Cage
