= Etudes Boreales =

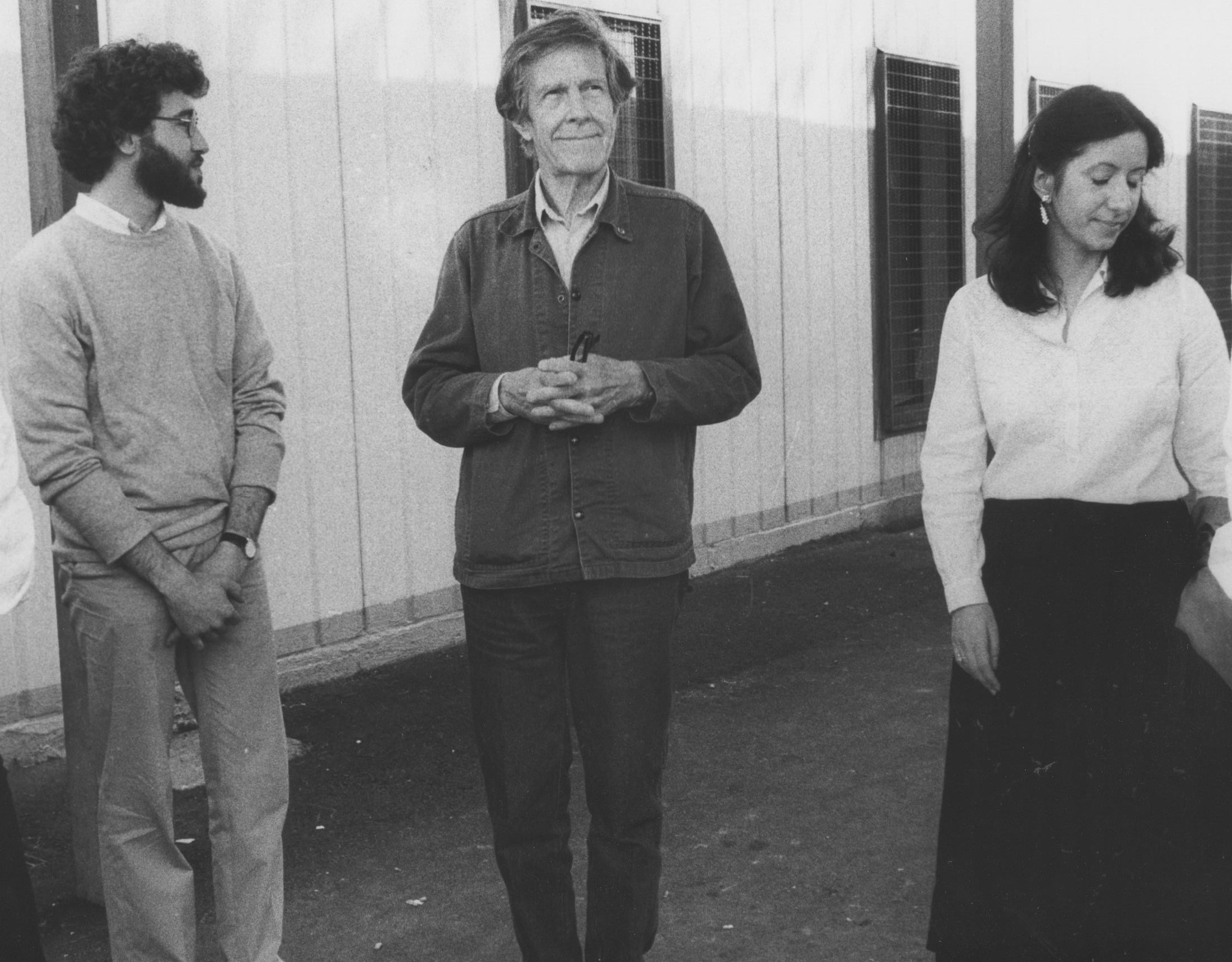
Giulio Castagnoli, John Cage, and Luisa Castellani in 1984

Etudes Boreales is a set of etudes for cello and/or piano composed by John Cage in 1978. The set is a small counterpart to Cage's other etude collections, Etudes Australes for piano and Freeman Etudes for violin.

Etudes Boreales were composed for, and dedicated to, the cellist Jack Kirstein (1921-1996) and his wife, the pianist Jeanne Kirstein (1924-1979). The latter performed Cage's piano works in the 1970s, but found Etudes Boreales unplayable; the first performer to find a way to play the pieces was percussionist Michael Pugliese (Pritchett, 199).

The set comprises four pieces. The cello parts are technically similar to Freeman Etudes: they are extremely demanding pieces composed using chance operations, every aspect of the work meticulously detailed in the score. The difference between the works is that in Etudes Boreales the pitch range is limited at any given time, and changes throughout the pieces, whereas in Freeman Etudes the range was unlimited. An excerpt from one of the etudes shows that the technique required involves the ability to jump accurately to any point on the fingerboard or beyond, which is particularly difficult in these pieces as they are to be played without vibrato (Stowell, 221):

The piano parts of Etudes Boreales were composed using star charts, as in Atlas Eclipticalis, Etudes Australes and Song Books (here Cage chose the maps of Atlas Boreales, an atlas of the northern sky by Antonín Bečvář, hence the title of the work). However, the charts were used not to determine actual pitches, as in those works, but to determine where on the piano the performer is to play (the keyboard, the frame, the strings, etc.). This effectively transforms the piano etudes into percussion works (Pritchett, 199).

Cello and piano parts may be performed separately, as Etudes Boreales for cello or Etudes Boreales for piano, or simultaneously as duets, although they were composed independently.

== Editions ==
- Edition Peters 66327-66328. (c) 1981 by Henmar Press.
