= Grete Sultan =

German-American pianist (1906–2005)

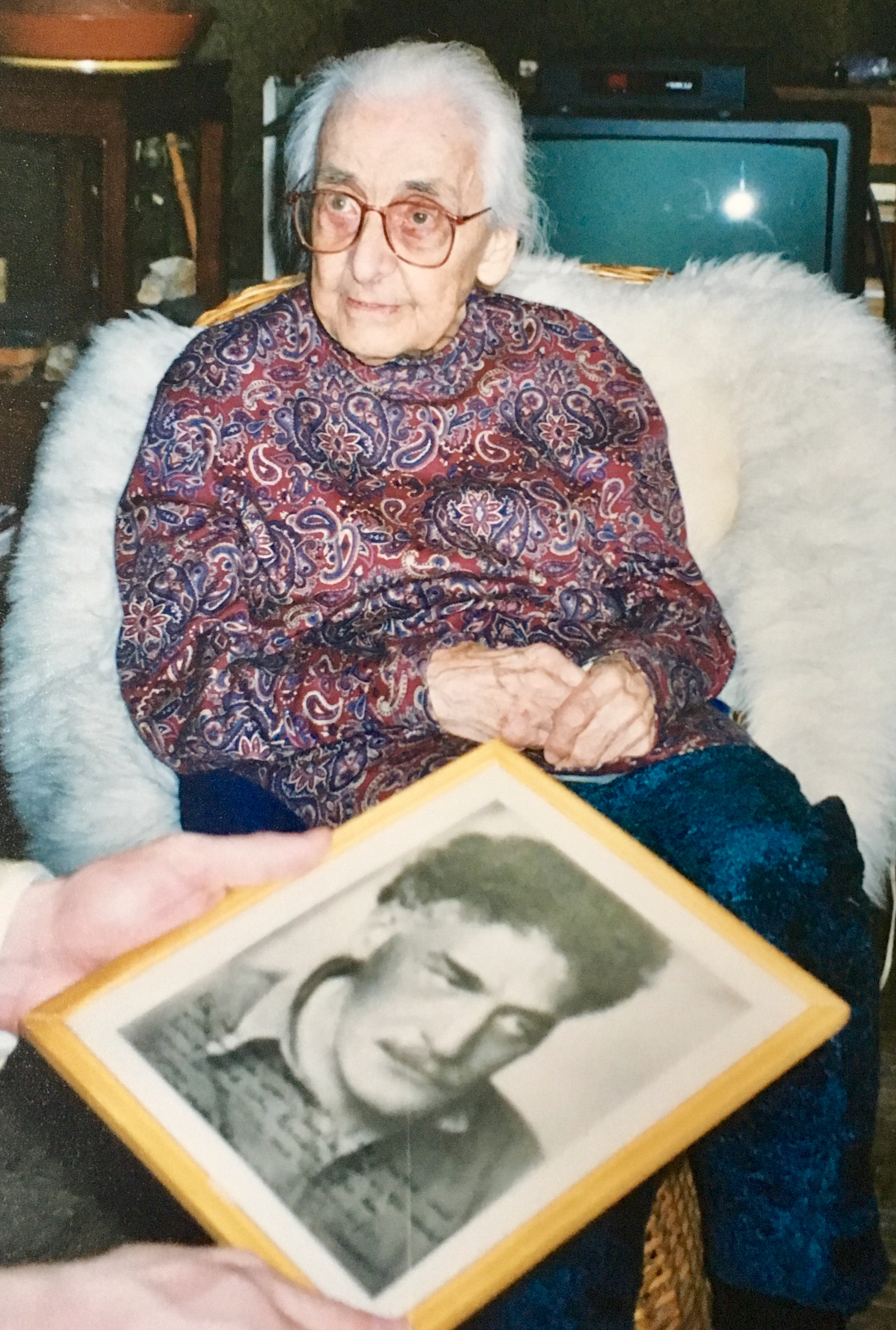
- Sultan sitting behind a portrait of Richard Buhlig
- Born: Johanna Margarete Sultan; June 21, 1906; Berlin, German Empire
- Died: June 26, 2005 (aged 99); Manhattan, New York, United States
- Occupation: Pianist

Grete Sultan (born Johanna Margarete Sultan) (June 21, 1906 – June 26, 2005) was a German-American pianist.

== Biography ==
Sultan was born in Berlin into a musical family of Jewish heritage. From an early age she studied piano with American pianist Richard Buhlig, and later with Leonid Kreutzer and Edwin Fischer. In 1933, after the Nazis came to power in Germany, her ethnicity led to her being banned from playing in public. She was allowed to only appear in concerts of the Jüdischer Kulturbund.

With Buhlig's help, Sultan fled Germany in 1941 via Lisbon, from where she emigrated to the United States by ship. She settled in New York City and took up piano teaching, first at Vassar College and the 92nd Street Y, then at the Masters School in Dobbs Ferry, New York. In the mid-1940s, she met the composer John Cage and became good friends with him. Sultan introduced Cage to one of her students, Christian Wolff; he gave Cage his first copy of the I Ching, which subsequently influenced his musical thinking.

Cage dedicated two pieces to Sultan. The first was part of his Music for Piano series, Music for Piano 53–68. In 1974, when Sultan was in the process of learning Cage's Music of Changes, the composer offered to write some new music for her, and the result was a monumental piano cycle, Etudes Australes. Sultan made the premiere recording of the work and played it in concerts worldwide. She also performed the music of Alan Hovhaness and Tui St. George Tucker, but contemporary composers were not the only ones that interested her. In the 1940s she helped popularize Johann Sebastian Bach's Goldberg Variations; her concert programs included music from Ludwig van Beethoven, Frédéric Chopin, and Franz Schubert to Igor Stravinsky, Earle Brown and Morton Feldman.

Grete Sultan gave her last recital in 1996, aged 90, at New York's Merkin Concert Hall, performing Bach's Goldberg Variations. She died in a Manhattan hospital on June 26, 2005.

In 2012, Schott Music published Rebellische Pianistin. Das Leben der Grete Sultan zwischen Berlin und New York (Rebellious Pianist: The Life of Grete Sultan Between Berlin and New York), a biography on Sultan by Moritz von Bredow.

== Discography ==
- John Cage: Etudes Australes [Wergo 60152/55 (Edition John Cage)]
- "Grete Sultan - The Legacy, Vol. 1": Bach (Goldberg Variations), Debussy, Schoenberg and Cage (Concord 42030)
- "Grete Sultan - The Legacy, Vol. 2": Beethoven (Diabelli Variations), Copland, Wolpe, Hovhaness, Cage u.a. (Labor 7038-20)
- Grete Sultan - Piano Seasons (1-Bach; 2-Beethoven; 3-Schubert/Schumann; 4-Schönberg/Copland/Weber/Wolpe/Hovhaness/Cage/Ichiyanagi) [Wergo WER 40432, 4 CDs]
