= Crete Cage =

American journalist and clubwoman

- Crete Cage, from a 1931 newspaper.
- Born: Lucretia Harvey; September 4, 1881; Iowa, U.S.
- Died: December 22, 1968 (aged 87); Upper Montclair, New Jersey, U.S.
- Occupation: Journalist
- Children: John Cage

Lucretia Harvey Cage (September 4, 1881 – December 22, 1968), known as Crete Cage, was an American journalist and clubwoman who worked at the Los Angeles Times. Her son was composer John Cage.

== Early life ==
Lucretia Harvey was born in Iowa, the daughter of James Cary Harvey and Minnie Puriton Harvey. (Some sources list 1885 as her birth year.)

== Career ==
Crete Cage played piano at a Protestant church in Colorado as a young woman. She was a "professional club woman" in the 1920s, state chair of press and publicity for the California Federation of Women's Clubs, until 1931, when she retired to become president of the Hostess Presidents' Club. In 1935 she was named to the executive committee of the Women's Civic Conference. She was heard on radio, giving reports on women's club activities in Southern California. She was part of a group of women who started an "arts and crafts" cooperative shop in downtown Los Angeles, to help unemployed craftsmen sell their work during the Depression. She was also active in leadership at the Ebell Club, and founder of the Lincoln Study Club chapters in Detroit and Los Angeles.

Cage worked at the Los Angeles Times from 1934 to 1939, as a society page editor, covering women's clubs. With her Times colleague, music critic Isabel Morse Jones, she worked for a new concert hall for the Los Angeles Philharmonic.

Her son John Cage wrote a composition for solo piano titled "Crete" (1944 or 1945), named for her.

== Personal life ==
Lucretia Harvey was married twice before she married John Milton Cage in 1908. They had a son, composer John Cage, born in 1912 in Los Angeles. They lived in the Eagle Rock neighborhood of Los Angeles in a home they shared with her parents and sometimes with her sisters Margaret, Josephine, and Phoebe. She died in Upper Montclair, New Jersey in 1968, aged 87 years. Her scrapbooks documenting her son's life from 1916 to 1954 are archived in the special collections library at Northwestern University.
