= Isabel Morse Jones =

American music critic (1892–1951)

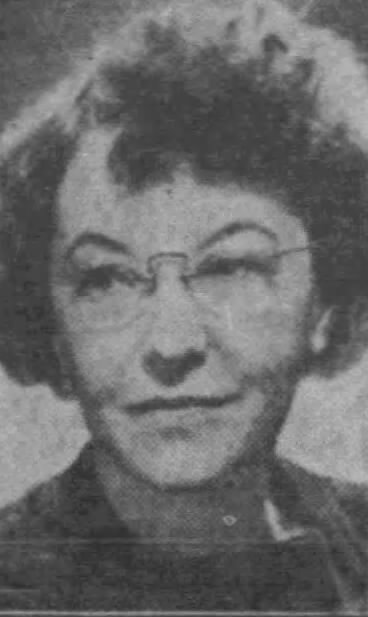
- Isabel Morse Jones in 1939
- Born: Isabel Morse; 1892; Cleveland, Ohio
- Died: September 4, 1951 (aged 58–59); Rome, Italy
- Occupations: Music critic, musician, clubwoman

Isabel Morse Jones (1892 – September 4, 1951) was an American musician, arts patron, and clubwoman. She was the music and dance critic at the Los Angeles Times, from 1925 to 1947.

== Early life ==
Isabel Morse was born in 1892 in Cleveland, Ohio, the daughter of Arthur Mason Morse. She was raised in Los Angeles, California. She attended Los Angeles High School and the University of California, Los Angeles. She was a descendant of painter and inventor Samuel Morse. By 1915, she was living in Hermosa Beach and hosting musical events at her home.

== Career ==
=== Music and dance ===
Morse Jones taught and played violin in the Los Angeles Women's Symphony Orchestra. From 1925 until 1947, she was music and dance critic at the Los Angeles Times. She worked with her friend, society page editor Crete Cage, to build support for a new concert hall for the Los Angeles Philharmonic. Morse Jones also wrote about music on the Pacific Coast for the Christian Science Monitor and the magazine Musical America.

Morse Jones lectured on music to community and professional groups, and spoke about music on Los Angeles radio programs. She was a founder of the Los Angeles Bureau of Music, and a founding member of the Los Angeles County Music Commission. She also supported the founding of Henry Cowell's New Music Society in Los Angeles, in 1925.

=== Hollywood Bowl ===
Morse Jones served a press agent for the Hollywood Bowl, and wrote a history of the venue in 1936.

== Personal life ==
Isabel Morse married Carroll Welborn Jones in 1923. They had a daughter, Carolyn Mason Jones, who became a noted opera photographer. Isabel Morse Jones died while staying with her daughter in Rome in 1951.
