= Freeman Etudes =

Set of études composed by John Cage

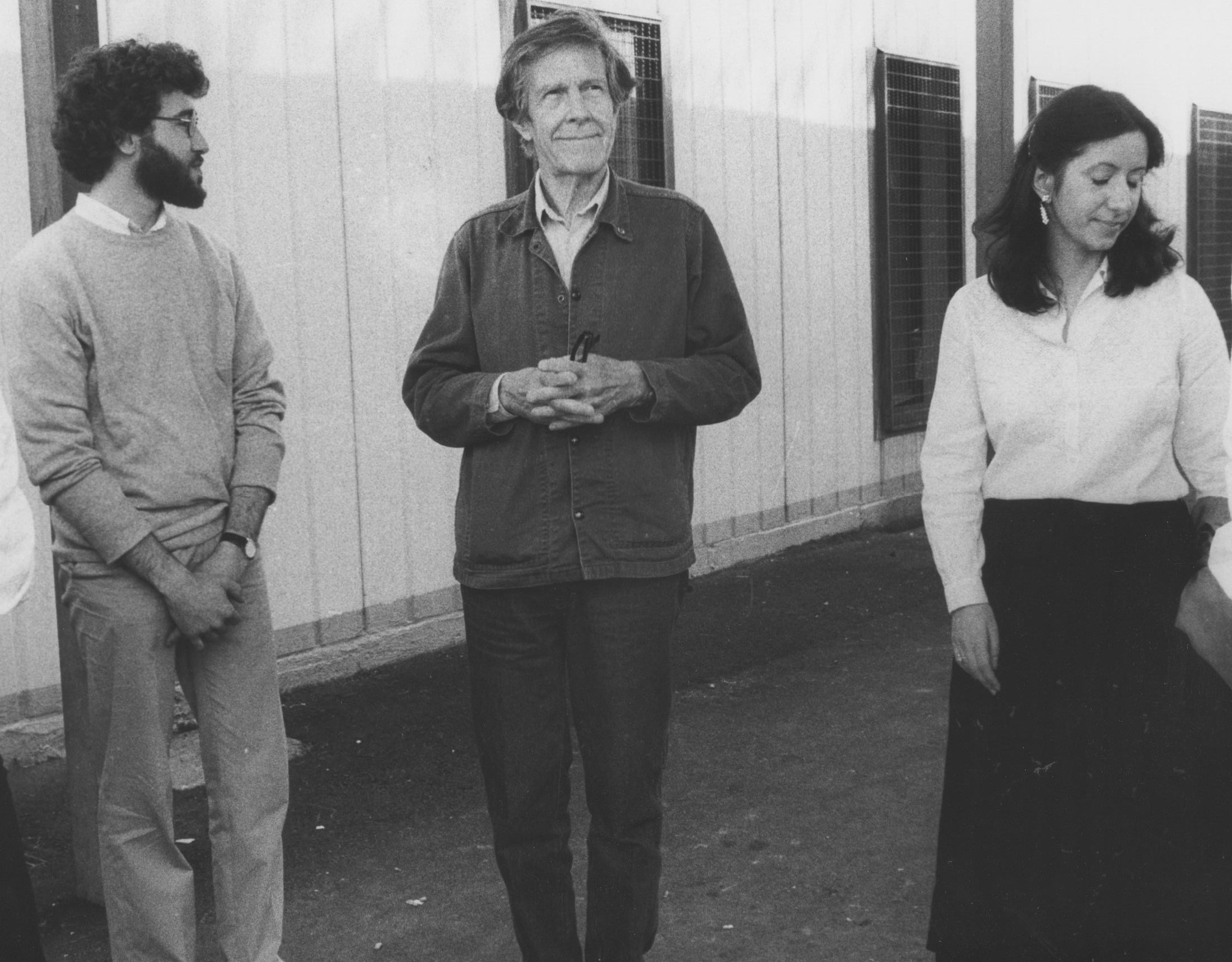
Giulio Castagnoli, John Cage, and Luisa Castellani in 1984

Freeman Etudes are a set of etudes for solo violin composed by John Cage. Like the earlier Etudes Australes for piano, these works are incredibly complex, nearly impossible to perform, and represented for Cage the "practicality of the impossible" as an answer to the notion that resolving the world's political and social problems is impossible.

== Details ==
In 1977 Cage was approached by Betty Freeman, who asked him to compose a set of etudes for violinist Paul Zukofsky (who would, at around the same time, also help Cage with work on the violin transcription of Cheap Imitation). Cage decided to model the work on his earlier set of etudes for piano, Etudes Australes. That work was a set of 32 etudes, 4 books of 8 etudes each, and composed using controlled chance by means of star charts and, as was usual for Cage, the I Ching. Zukofsky asked Cage for music that would be notated in a conventional manner, which he assumed Cage was returning to in Etudes Australes, and as precise as possible. Cage understood the request literally and proceeded to create compositions which would have so many details that it would be almost impossible to perform them. An example from one of the more difficult etudes follows:

Beginning of Etude No. 18, from Book II of Freeman Etudes

In 1980 Cage abandoned the cycle, partly because Zukofsky attested that the pieces were unplayable. The first seventeen etudes were completed, though, and Books I and II (Etudes 1–16) were published and performed (the first performance of Books I and II was done by János Négyesy in 1984 in Turin, Italy). Violinist Irvine Arditti expressed an interest in the work and, by summer 1988, was able to perform Books I and II at a much faster tempo than anyone else, thus proving that the music was, in fact, playable. Arditti continued to practice the etudes, aiming at an even faster speed, and pointed out to Cage that the score indicated—providing each Etude was at the same tempo—the speed could be further increased. The essence of the score indications about tempo are that one should play the most condensed and difficult sections "as short a time-length as his virtuosity permits", and play the rest at the same speed. Inspired by the fact that the music was playable, Cage decided to complete the cycle for Arditti which he finally did in 1990 with the help of James Pritchett, who assisted the composer in reconstructing the method used to compose the works (which was required, because Cage himself forgot the details after 10 years of not working on the piece). In Books III and IV Cage wrote much more complicated music than in the first half of the work and in fact forcing Arditti to slightly reduce the tempo of each Etude. The first complete performance of all Etudes (1–32) was given by Irvine Arditti in Zürich in June 1991 which took about 1 hour and 35 minutes. Négyesy also performed the last two books of the Etudes in the same year in Ferrara, Italy. The testament to each player's interpretation of the work can be compared on their CD recordings; Arditti took 1 hour 32 minutes, and Négyesy 2 hours 8 minutes.

== Editions ==
- Edition Peters 66813 a/b/c/d. (c) 1981, 1992 by Henmar Press.

== See also ==
- List of compositions by John Cage
- Etudes Australes
- Etudes Boreales

== Notes ==
Sources

- Kostelanetz, Richard. 2003. Conversing with Cage, 2nd edition. New York: Routledge. ISBN 0-415-93791-4 (cloth) ISBN 0-415-93792-2 (pbk)
- Pritchett, James. 1994a. "John Cage: Freeman Etudes", CD liner notes to: John Cage, Freeman Etudes (Books 1 and 2) (Irvine Arditti, violin), Mode 32. (Accessed 14 August 2008)
- Pritchett, James. 1994b. "The Completion of John Cage's Freeman Etudes". Perspectives of New Music 32, no. 2 (Summer): 264–70.
