= David Nicholls (musicologist) =

British musicologist and composer (born 1955)

David Nicholls (born in 1955) is a British musicologist and composer.

== Biography ==
Born in Small Heath, Birmingham, Nicholls was a pupil at St. Benedict's Primary School in Small Heath and subsequently at the King Edward VI Camp Hill School for Boys, in King's Heath. He then read Music at St. John's College, Cambridge, and graduated with a first. In 1986, he completed a Ph.D. at Cambridge, under the supervision of the distinguished British composer Hugh Wood, with a thesis on the compositional techniques of Charles Ives, Henry Cowell, John Cage, and other experimental composers.

Between 1984 and 1987, Nicholls was Keasbey Fellow in American Studies at Selwyn College, Cambridge. In 1998, he spent an extended semester at The College of William and Mary in Virginia, United States, as Visiting Professor of Music. From 1987 to 2000, he was Professor of Music and sometime Research Dean of the Faculty of Humanities at Keele University. From 2000 to 2013, he was Professor of Music at the University of Southampton. Subsequently he took early retirement due to disenchantment with the tertiary educational system in the UK; he was initially awarded the title of Emeritus Professor of Music, though he later relinquished this post. During his academic career Nicholls gave many presentations – both refereed and guest – in North America, France, Germany, Mexico, Australia, Taiwan, and the United Kingdom.

Nicholls is a former editor of the journal American Music (2000–2005). Until 2000 he was also active as a composer, and his works were performed and broadcast in the United Kingdom, Europe, America, Australia, and South Africa.

== Major compositions ==
- Stars and Distances, 1977–78; revised 1981 (16 solo voices, optional electronics)
- Three Empson Songs, 1978–79 (soprano, clarinet, percussion)
- Reflections and Refractions, 1978 (flute, clarinet, piano, string trio)
- Pleiades, 1979–80 (three groups of instruments)
- ... with which to open ... and ... with which to close ..., 1982 (soprano, clarinet, piano)
- Competitive Strategies 2, 1982 (oboe)
- The Giant's Heart, 1983 (mimes/dancers/puppets/actors, optional tape)
- Chi, 1983, revised 1987–88 (dancer, percussionist, live electronics)
- Carol, 1983 (8 voices, organ, bells)
- Seascape, 1984 (strings, harp, celesta, 4 percussion)
- Gonepteryx rhamni, 1985 (clarinet, piano)
- Siva Dances, 1985
- ... whisperings upon leaves ..., 1986 (soprano, 10 instruments)
- Mosaic, 1986 (flute, clarinet, piano, vibraphone, violin, violoncello)
- In the Cage, 1986 (singing/speaking recorder player, optional assistant/tape)
- 2 Japanese Miniatures, 1988–89 (8 players)
- Largo e Piano, 1989 (14 players)
- Winter Landscape with Skaters and Birdtrap, 1989–90 (string quartet)
- Several Elephants, 1989–90 (soprano saxophone, tenor saxophone, trombone/bass saxophone)
- Cantata: Jerusalem, 1990–91 (soprano, 2 mixed choruses, 2 wind & percussion bands)
- Sam Bam and the House in the Sky, 1994–95 (children's musical for voices and instruments)
- Lily's Birds, 1996 (a musical story for children; string quartet and narrator)
- Songs of the Spirit, 1998 (SATB chorus)
- Tears, 1998 (soprano, clarinet, piano)

== Books ==
- American Experimental Music 1890–1940, Cambridge, New York, and Melbourne: Cambridge University Press (1991), ISBN 0-521-42464-X.
- (as editor) The Whole World of Music: A Henry Cowell Symposium, Amsterdam: Harwood Academic Press (1997), ISBN 90-5755-003-2.
- (as editor) The Cambridge History of American Music, Cambridge, New York, and Melbourne: Cambridge University Press (1998), ISBN 0-521-45429-8.
- (as editor) The Cambridge Companion to John Cage, Cambridge University Press (2002), ISBN 9780521789684.
- John Cage, University of Illinois Press (2007), ISBN 978-0-252-03215-8; Spanish translation: Turner Libros (2010), ISBN 978-84-7506-870-1.

== Personal life ==
Since 1984 Nicholls has been married to the writer and educator Tamar Hodes, with whom he has two children: Benjamin (born 1987) and Daisy (born 1990). Since retiring, Nicholls has spent his time primarily engaged in activities rendered impossible during his working life: gardening, cooking, reading non-academic literature, and building a large-scale model railway.
