= John Cage =

American avant-garde composer (1912–1992)

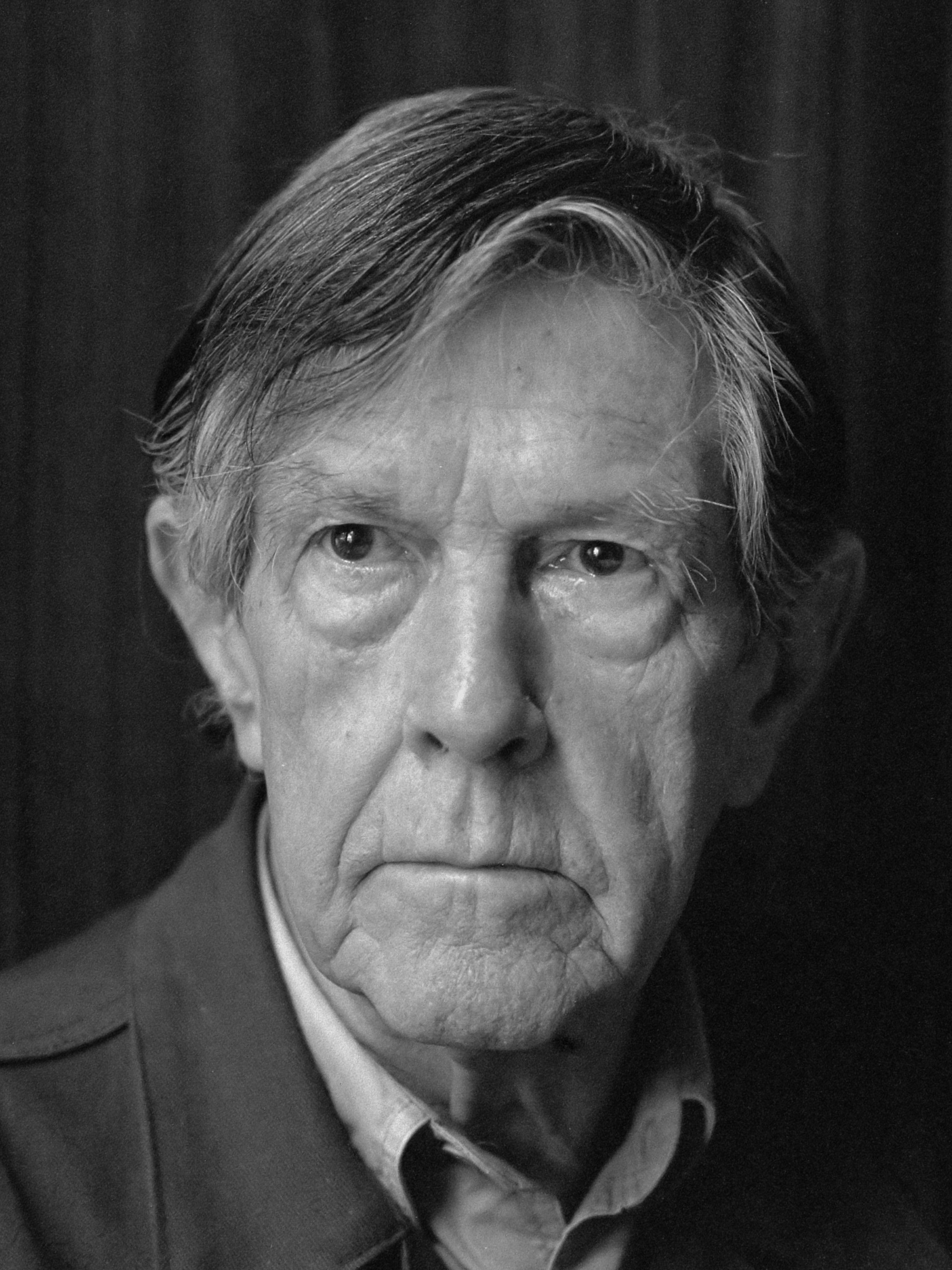
- Cage in 1988
- Born: John Milton Cage Jr. September 5, 1912; Los Angeles, California, U.S.
- Died: August 12, 1992 (aged 79); New York City, U.S.
- Education: Pomona College (dropped out)
- Occupations: Composer; music theorist; artist; philosopher
- Notable work: 4'33"; Sonatas and Interludes for prepared piano
- Spouse: Xenia Andreyevna Kashevaroff (m. 1935; div. 1945)
- Partner: Merce Cunningham
- Awards: Honorary Doctorate at the Californian Institute of Arts (1986) Kyoto Prize (1989)

John Milton Cage Jr. (September 5, 1912 – August 12, 1992) was an American composer, visual artist and music theorist. A pioneer of indeterminacy in music, electroacoustic music, and non-standard use of musical instruments, Cage was one of the leading figures of the post-war avant-garde. Critics have lauded him as one of the most influential composers of the 20th century. He was also instrumental in the development of modern dance, mostly through his association with choreographer Merce Cunningham, who was also Cage's romantic partner for most of their lives.

Cage's teachers included Henry Cowell (1933) and Arnold Schoenberg (1933–35), both known for their radical innovations in music, but Cage's major influences lay in various East and South Asian cultures. Through his studies of Indian philosophy and Zen Buddhism in the late 1940s, Cage came to the idea of aleatoric or chance-controlled music, which he started composing in 1951. The I Ching, an ancient Chinese classic text and decision-making tool, became Cage's standard composition tool for the rest of his life. In a 1957 lecture, "Experimental Music", he described music as "a purposeless play" which is "an affirmation of life – not an attempt to bring order out of chaos nor to suggest improvements in creation, but simply a way of waking up to the very life we're living".

Cage's best known work is the 1952 composition 4′33″, a piece performed in the absence of deliberate sound; musicians who perform the work do nothing but be present for the duration specified by the title. The content of the composition is intended to be the sounds of the environment heard by the audience during performance. The work's challenge to assumed definitions about musicianship and musical experience made it a popular and controversial topic both in musicology and the broader aesthetics of art and performance. Cage was also a pioneer of the prepared piano (a piano with its sound altered by objects placed between or on its strings or hammers), for which he wrote numerous dance-related works and a few concert pieces. These include Sonatas and Interludes (1946–48).

== Life ==
=== 1912–1931: Early years ===
Cage was born September 5, 1912, at Good Samaritan Hospital in downtown Los Angeles. His father, John Milton Cage Sr. (1886–1964), was an inventor, and his mother, Lucretia ("Crete") Harvey (1881–1968), worked intermittently as a journalist for the Los Angeles Times. The family's roots were deeply American: in a 1976 interview, Cage mentioned that George Washington was assisted by an ancestor named John Cage in the task of surveying the Colony of Virginia. Cage described his mother as a woman with "a sense of society" who was "never happy", while his father is perhaps best characterized by his inventions, which were sometimes idealistic, such as a diesel-fueled submarine that gave off exhaust bubbles. The senior Cage was uninterested in an undetectable submarine. Other inventions were revolutionary and against the scientific norms, such as the "electrostatic field theory" of the universe. (Note: Cage quoted in Kostelanetz 2003, 1–2. Cage mentions a working model of the universe that his father had built, and that the scientists who saw it could not explain how it worked and refused to believe it.) John Cage Sr. taught his son that "if someone says 'can't' that shows you what to do." In 1944–45, Cage wrote two small character pieces dedicated to his parents: Crete and Dad. The latter is a short lively piece that ends abruptly, while "Crete" is a slightly longer, mostly melodic contrapuntal work.

When Cage was 18 months old, he ate two or three strychnine tablets. "At first the baby's life was despaired of," an article stated, but "a stomach pump was administered with success".

Cage's first experiences with music were from private piano teachers in the Greater Los Angeles area and several relatives, particularly his aunt Phoebe Harvey James who introduced him to the piano music of the 19th century. He first received piano lessons at school in fourth grade and enjoyed music, but expressed more interest in sight-reading than technique without yet thinking of composition. During high school, one of his music teachers was Fannie Charles Dillon. By 1928, though, Cage was convinced that he wanted to be a writer. He graduated that year from Los Angeles High School as a valedictorian, having also in the spring given a prize-winning speech at the Hollywood Bowl proposing a day of quiet for all Americans; by being "hushed and silent," he said, "we should have the opportunity to hear what other people think."

Cage enrolled at Pomona College in Claremont, California, as a theology major in 1928. At Pomona, he encountered the work of the artist Marcel Duchamp via Professor José Pijoan, of the writer James Joyce via Don Sample, of the philosopher Ananda Coomaraswamy, and of the composer Henry Cowell. In 1930, he dropped out of Pomona, having come to believe that "college was of no use to a writer" after an incident described in his 1991 autobiographical statement:

I was shocked at college to see one hundred of my classmates in the library all reading copies of the same book. Instead of doing as they did, I went into the stacks and read the first book written by an author whose name began with Z. I received the highest grade in the class. That convinced me that the institution was not being run correctly. I left.

Cage persuaded his parents that a trip to Europe would be more beneficial to a future writer than college studies. He subsequently hitchhiked to Galveston, Texas, and sailed from there to Le Havre, France, from where he took a train to Paris. Cage stayed in Europe for 18 months, trying his hand at various forms of art. First, he studied Gothic and Greek architecture, but decided he was not interested enough in architecture to dedicate his life to it. He then took up painting, poetry and music. It was in Europe that, encouraged by his teacher Lazare Lévy, he first heard the music of contemporary composers (such as Igor Stravinsky and Paul Hindemith) and finally got to know the music of Johann Sebastian Bach, which he had not experienced before.

After several months in Paris, Cage's enthusiasm for America was revived after he read Walt Whitman's Leaves of Grass. He wanted to return immediately, but his parents, with whom he regularly exchanged letters during the entire trip, persuaded him to stay in Europe for a little longer and explore the continent. Cage started traveling, visiting various places in France, Germany, and Spain, as well as Capri in Italy and, most importantly, Mallorca, Spain, where he started composing. His first compositions were created using dense mathematical formulas, but Cage was displeased with the results and left the finished pieces behind when he left. Cage's association with theater also started in Europe: during a walk in Seville he witnessed, in his own words, "the multiplicity of simultaneous visual and audible events all going together in one's experience and producing enjoyment."

=== 1931–1936: Apprenticeship ===
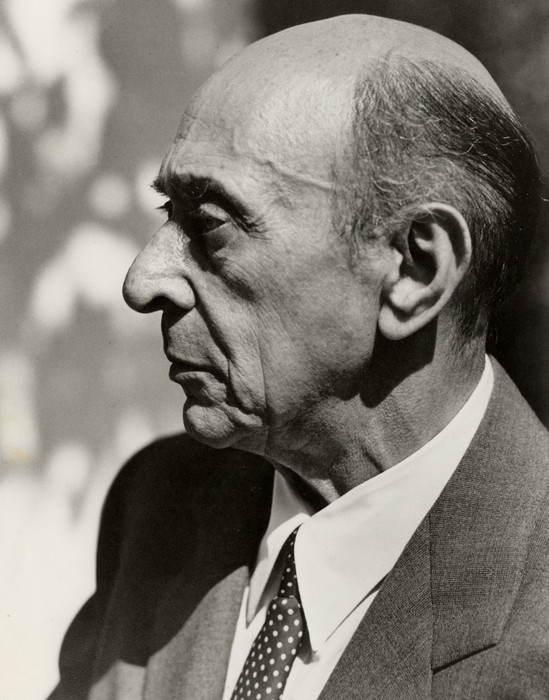
Cage studied with composer Arnold Schoenberg from 1933 to 1935.

Cage returned to the United States in 1931. He went to Santa Monica, California, where he made a living partly by giving small, private lectures on contemporary art. He got to know various important figures of the Southern California art world, including arts patron Galka Scheyer and his later composition teacher Richard Buhlig. By 1933, Cage had decided to concentrate on music rather than painting. "The people who heard my music had better things to say about it than the people who looked at my paintings had to say about my paintings", Cage later explained. In 1933, he sent some of his compositions to Henry Cowell; the reply was a "rather vague letter", in which Cowell suggested that Cage study with Arnold Schoenberg—Cage's musical ideas at the time included composition based on a 25-tone row, somewhat similar to Schoenberg's twelve-tone technique. Cowell also advised that, before approaching Schoenberg, Cage should take some preliminary lessons, and recommended Adolph Weiss, a former Schoenberg pupil. Weiss had been asked by Schoenberg to be his assistant and to train students who might not be ready for Schoenberg's teaching.

Following Cowell's advice, Cage traveled to New York City in 1933 and started studying with Weiss as well as taking lessons from Cowell himself at The New School. He supported himself financially by taking up a job washing walls at a YWCA (Young Women's Christian Association) in Brooklyn. Cage's routine during that period was apparently very tiring, with just four hours of sleep on most nights, and four hours of composition every day starting at 4 am. Several months later, still in 1933, Cage became sufficiently good at composition to approach Schoenberg. (Note: Different sources give different details of their first meeting. Pritchett, Kuhn & Garrett 2012, in Grove, imply that Cage met Schoenberg in New York City: "Cage followed Schoenberg to Los Angeles in 1934". In a 1976 interview quoted in Kostelanetz 2003, 5, Cage mentions that he "went to see him [Schoenberg] in Los Angeles.") He could not afford Schoenberg's price, and when he mentioned it, the older composer asked whether Cage would devote his life to music. After Cage replied that he would, Schoenberg offered to tutor him free of charge.

Cage studied with Schoenberg in California first at the University of Southern California and then at the University of California, Los Angeles, as well as privately. The older composer became one of the biggest influences on Cage, who "literally worshipped him", particularly as an example of how to live one's life being a composer. The vow Cage gave, to dedicate his life to music, was apparently still important some 40 years later, when Cage "had no need for it [i.e. writing music]", he continued composing partly because of the promise he gave. Schoenberg's methods and their influence on Cage are well documented by Cage himself in various lectures and writings. Particularly well-known is the conversation mentioned in the 1958 lecture Indeterminacy:

After I had been studying with him for two years, Schoenberg said, "In order to write music, you must have a feeling for harmony." I explained to him that I had no feeling for harmony. He then said that I would always encounter an obstacle, that it would be as though I came to a wall through which I could not pass. I said, "In that case I will devote my life to beating my head against that wall."

Cage studied with Schoenberg for two years, but although he admired his teacher, he decided to leave after Schoenberg told his students that he was trying to make it impossible for them to write music. Much later, Cage recounted the incident: "... When he said that, I revolted, not against him, but against what he had said. I determined then and there, more than ever before, to write music." Although Schoenberg was not impressed with Cage's compositional abilities during these two years, in a later interview, where he initially said that none of his American pupils were interesting, he further stated in reference to Cage: "There was one ... of course he's not a composer, but he's an inventor—of genius." Cage would later adopt the "inventor" moniker and deny that he was a composer.

At some point in 1934–35, Cage met artist Xenia Andreyevna Kashevaroff while working at his mother's arts and crafts shop,. She was the Alaskan-born daughter of a Russian priest; her work encompassed fine bookbinding, sculpture and collage. Although Cage was involved in relationships with Don Sample and with architect Rudolph Schindler's wife Pauline, he fell in love with Xenia immediately. Cage and Kashevaroff were married in Yuma, Arizona, on June 7, 1935.

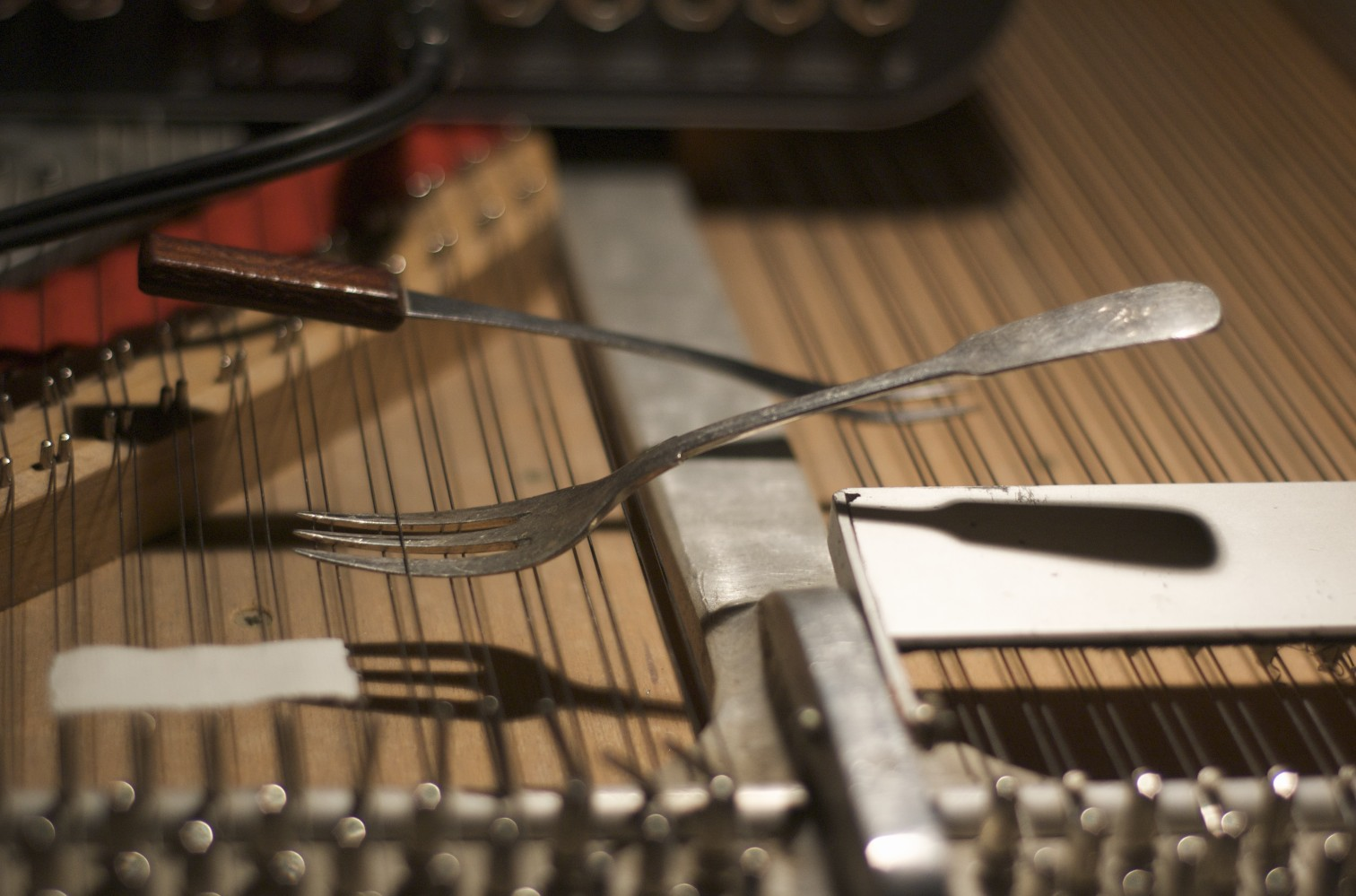
An example of a prepared piano

=== 1937–1949: Modern dance and Eastern influences ===
The newly-married couple first lived with Cage's parents in Pacific Palisades, Los Angeles, and then moved to Hollywood. During 1936–38, Cage changed jobs multiple times, including to one that started his lifelong association with modern dance: dance accompanist at the University of California, Los Angeles. He produced music for choreographies and at one point taught a course on "Musical Accompaniments for Rhythmic Expression" at UCLA with his aunt Phoebe. It was during that time that Cage first started experimenting with unorthodox instruments, such as household items, metal sheets, and so on. This was inspired by Oskar Fischinger, who told Cage that "everything in the world has a spirit that can be released through its sound." Although Cage did not share the idea of spirits, these words inspired him to begin exploring the sounds produced by hitting various non-musical objects.

In 1938, on Cowell's recommendation, Cage drove to San Francisco to find employment and to seek out fellow Cowell student and composer Lou Harrison. According to Cowell, the two composers had a shared interest in percussion and dance and would likely hit it off. Indeed, upon meeting the two immediately established a strong bond and began a working relationship that continued for several years. Harrison soon helped Cage to secure a faculty position at Mills College, teaching the same program as at UCLA and collaborating with choreographer Marian van Tuyl. Several famous dance groups were present, and Cage's interest in modern dance grew further. After several months, he left and moved to Seattle, Washington, where he found work as composer and accompanist for choreographer Bonnie Bird at the Cornish College of the Arts. The Cornish School years proved to be a particularly important period in Cage's life. Aside from teaching and working as accompanist, Cage organized a percussion ensemble that toured the West Coast and brought the composer his first fame. His reputation was enhanced further with the invention of the prepared piano—a piano which has had its sound altered by objects placed on, beneath, or between the strings—in 1940. This concept was originally intended for a performance staged in a room too small to include a full percussion ensemble. It was also at the Cornish School that Cage met several people who became lifelong friends, such as painter Mark Tobey and dancer Merce Cunningham. The latter was to become Cage's lifelong romantic partner and artistic collaborator.

Cage left Seattle in the summer of 1941 after the painter László Moholy-Nagy invited him to teach at the Chicago School of Design (what later became the IIT Institute of Design). The composer accepted partly because he hoped to find opportunities to organize a center for experimental music that were not available in Seattle. These opportunities did not materialize. Cage taught at the Chicago School of Design and worked as accompanist and composer at the University of Chicago. At one point, his reputation as percussion composer landed him a commission from the Columbia Broadcasting System to compose a soundtrack for a radio play by Kenneth Patchen. The result, The City Wears a Slouch Hat, was received well, and Cage deduced that more important commissions would follow. Hoping to find these, he left Chicago for New York City in the spring of 1942.

In New York, the Cages first stayed with painter Max Ernst and Peggy Guggenheim. Through them, Cage met important artists such as Piet Mondrian, André Breton, Jackson Pollock, Marcel Duchamp, and many others. Guggenheim was very supportive: the Cages could stay with her and Ernst for any length of time, and she offered to organize a concert of Cage's music at the opening of her gallery, which included paying for transportation of Cage's percussion instruments from Chicago. After she learned that Cage had secured a concert at the Museum of Modern Art (MoMA), Guggenheim withdrew all support, and, even after the ultimately successful MoMA concert, Cage was left homeless, unemployed, and penniless. The commissions he hoped for did not happen. He and Xenia spent the summer of 1942 with dancer Jean Erdman and her husband Joseph Campbell. Without the percussion instruments, Cage again turned to prepared piano, producing a substantial body of works for performances by various choreographers, including Merce Cunningham, who had moved to New York City several years earlier. Cage and Cunningham eventually became romantically involved, and Cage's marriage, already breaking up during the early 1940s, ended in divorce in 1945. Cunningham remained Cage's partner for the rest of his life. Cage also countered the lack of percussion instruments by writing, on one occasion, for voice and closed piano: the resulting piece, The Wonderful Widow of Eighteen Springs (1942), quickly became popular and was performed by the celebrated duo of Cathy Berberian and Luciano Berio. In 1944, he appeared in Maya Deren's At Land, a 15-minute silent experimental film.

Like his personal life, Cage's artistic life went through a crisis in the mid-1940s. The composer was experiencing a growing disillusionment with the idea of music as means of communication: the public rarely accepted his work, and Cage himself, too, had trouble understanding the music of his colleagues. In early 1946, Cage agreed to tutor Gita Sarabhai, an Indian musician who came to the US to study classical music. In return, he asked her to teach him about Indian music and philosophy. Cage also attended, in the late 1940s and early 1950s, D. T. Suzuki's lectures on Zen Buddhism, and read further the works of Coomaraswamy. The first fruits of these studies were works inspired by Indian concepts: Sonatas and Interludes for prepared piano, String Quartet in Four Parts, and others. Cage accepted the goal of music as explained to him by Sarabhai: "to sober and quiet the mind, thus rendering it susceptible to divine influences".

Early in 1946, his former teacher Richard Buhlig arranged for Cage to meet Berlin-born pianist Grete Sultan, who had escaped from Nazi persecution to New York in 1941. They became close, lifelong friends, and Cage later dedicated part of his Music for Piano and his monumental piano cycle Etudes Australes to her. In 1949, he received a Guggenheim Fellowship.

=== 1950s: Discovering chance ===
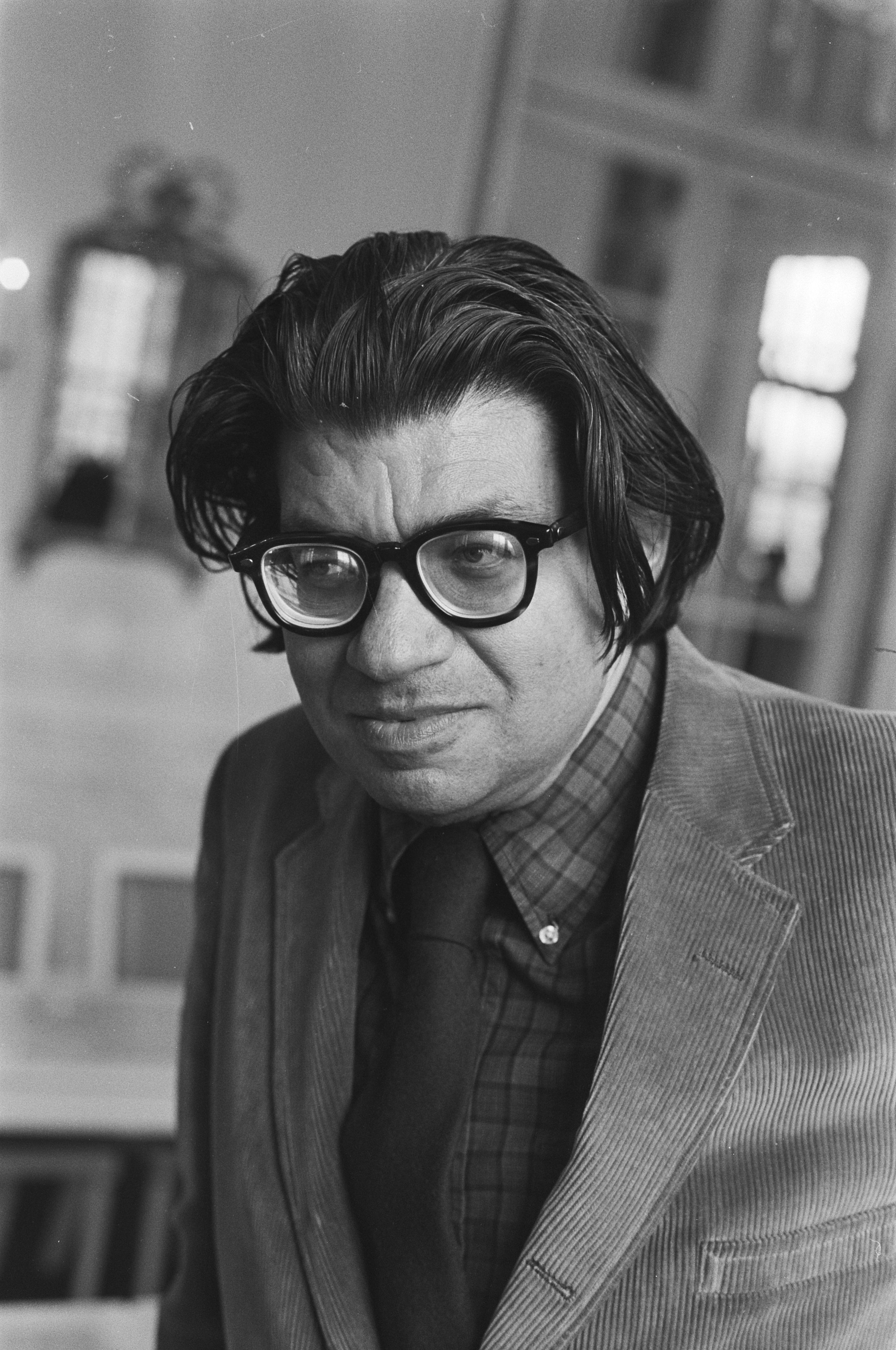
Composer Morton Feldman in 1976

After a 1949 performance at Carnegie Hall, New York, Cage received a grant from the Guggenheim Foundation, which enabled him to make a trip to Europe, where he met composers such as Olivier Messiaen and Pierre Boulez. More important was Cage's chance encounter with Morton Feldman in New York City in early 1950. Both composers attended a New York Philharmonic concert, where the orchestra performed Anton Webern's Symphony, followed by a piece by Sergei Rachmaninoff. Cage felt so overwhelmed by Webern's piece that he left before the Rachmaninoff; and in the lobby, he met Feldman, who was leaving for the same reason. The two composers quickly became friends; some time later Cage, Feldman, Earle Brown, pianist David Tudor, and Cage's pupil Christian Wolff came to be referred to as "the New York school".

In early 1951, Wolff presented Cage with a copy of the I Ching—a Chinese classic text which describes a symbol system used to identify order in chance events. This version of the I Ching was the first complete English translation and had been published by Wolff's father, Kurt Wolff of Pantheon Books, in 1950. The I Ching is commonly used for divination, but for Cage it became a tool to compose using chance. To compose a piece of music, Cage would come up with questions to ask the I Ching; the book would then be used in much the same way as it is used for divination. For Cage, this meant "imitating nature in its manner of operation". His lifelong interest in sound itself culminated in an approach that, in his view, yielded works in which sounds were free from the composer's will:

When I hear what we call music, it seems to me that someone is talking. And talking about his feelings, or about his ideas of relationships. But when I hear traffic, the sound of traffic—here on Sixth Avenue, for instance—I don't have the feeling that anyone is talking. I have the feeling that sound is acting. And I love the activity of sound ... I don't need sound to talk to me.

Although Cage had used chance on a few earlier occasions, most notably in the third movement of Concerto for Prepared Piano and Chamber Orchestra (1950–51), the I Ching opened new possibilities in this field for him. The first results of the new approach were Imaginary Landscape No. 4 for twelve radios and Music of Changes for piano. The latter work was written for Tudor, whom Cage had met through Feldman—another friendship that lasted until Cage's death. (Note: Recent research has shown that Cage may have met Tudor almost a decade earlier, in 1942, through Jean Erdman: Gann, Kyle (2008). "Cleaning Up a Life". artsjournal.com.) Tudor premiered most of Cage's works until the early 1960s, when he stopped performing on the piano and concentrated on composing. The I Ching became Cage's standard tool for composition; he used it in practically every work composed after 1951, and eventually settled on a computer algorithm that calculated numbers in a manner similar to throwing coins for the I Ching.

I Ching divination involves obtaining a hexagram by random generation (such as tossing coins), then reading the chapter associated with that hexagram.

Despite the fame Sonatas and Interludes earned him, and the connections he cultivated with American and European composers and musicians, Cage was quite poor. Although he still had an apartment at 326 Monroe Street (which he had occupied since around 1946), his financial situation in 1951 worsened so much that while working on Music of Changes, he prepared a set of instructions for Tudor as to how to complete the piece in the event of his death. Nevertheless, Cage managed to survive and maintained an active artistic life with lectures and performances.

In 1952–1953, he completed another mammoth project—Williams Mix for eight magnetic tapes, which Brown, Feldman, Tudor, and Bebe and Louis Barron helped to put together. Also in 1952, Cage composed the piece that became his best-known and most controversial creation: 4′33″. The score instructs the performer not to play the instrument during the entire duration of the piece—four minutes, thirty-three seconds—and is meant to be perceived as consisting of the sounds of the environment that the listeners hear while it is performed. Cage had conceived of "a silent piece" years earlier, but was reluctant to write it down; indeed, the premiere (given by Tudor on August 29, 1952, at Woodstock, New York) caused an uproar in the audience. The reaction to 4′33″ was just a part of the larger picture: on the whole, it was the adoption of chance procedures that had disastrous consequences for Cage's reputation. The press, which used to react favorably to his earlier percussion and prepared piano music, ignored his new works, and many valuable friendships and connections were lost. Boulez, who used to promote Cage's work in Europe, was opposed to Cage's particular approach to the use of chance, and so were other composers who came to prominence during the 1950s, such as Karlheinz Stockhausen.

During this time, Cage was also teaching at the avant-garde Black Mountain College just outside Asheville, North Carolina. Cage taught at the college in the summers of 1948 and 1952 and was in residence the summer of 1953. While at Black Mountain College in 1952, he organized what has been called the first "happening" in the United States, later titled Theatre Piece No. 1, a multi-layered, multi-media performance event staged the same day as Cage conceived it that "would greatly influence 1950s and 60s artistic practices." In addition to Cage, the participants included Cunningham and Tudor.

From 1953 onward, Cage was busy composing music for modern dance, particularly Cunningham's dances (Cage's partner adopted chance too, out of fascination for the movement of the human body), as well as developing new methods of using chance, in a series of works he referred to as The Ten Thousand Things. In the summer of 1954 he moved out of New York and settled in Gate Hill Cooperative, a community in Stony Point, New York, where his neighbors included David Tudor, M. C. Richards, Karen Karnes, Stan VanDerBeek, and Sari Dienes. The composer's financial situation gradually improved: in late 1954 he and Tudor were able to embark on a European tour. From 1956 to 1961 Cage taught classes in experimental composition at The New School, and from 1956 to 1958 he also worked as an art director and designer of typography. Among the works completed during the last years of the decade were Concert for Piano and Orchestra (1957–58), a seminal work in the history of graphic notation, and Variations I (1958).

=== 1960s: Fame ===
Cage was affiliated with Wesleyan University in Middletown, Connecticut, and collaborated with members of its music department from the 1950s until his death in 1992. At the university, the philosopher, poet, and professor of classics Norman O. Brown befriended Cage, an association that proved fruitful to both. In 1960 the composer was appointed a fellow on the faculty of the Center for Advanced Studies (now the Center for Humanities) in the Liberal Arts and Sciences at Wesleyan, where he started teaching classes in experimental music. In October 1961, Wesleyan University Press published Silence, a collection of Cage's lectures and writings on a wide variety of subjects, including the famous Lecture on Nothing that was composed using a complex time length scheme like some of his music. Silence was Cage's first book of six, but it remains his most widely read and influential. (Note: Technically, it was his second, for Cage previously collaborated with Kathleen Hoover on a biographical volume on Virgil Thomson which was published in 1959.) In the early 1960s, Cage began his lifelong association with the music publishing company Edition Peters. Walter Hinrichsen, the president of the corporation, offered Cage an exclusive contract and instigated the publication of a catalog of Cage's works, which appeared in 1962.

Edition Peters soon published a large number of scores by Cage, and this, together with the publication of Silence, led to much greater prominence for the composer than ever before. In 1965, Betty Freeman set up an annual grant for living expenses for Cage which continued until his death. By the mid-1960s, Cage was receiving so many commissions and requests for appearances that he was unable to fulfill them. This was accompanied by a busy touring schedule; consequently, his compositional output from that decade was scant. After the orchestral Atlas Eclipticalis (1961–62), a fully notated work based on star charts, Cage gradually shifted to, in his own words, "music (not composition)." The score of 0′00″, completed in 1962, originally comprised a single sentence: "In a situation provided with maximum amplification, perform a disciplined action", and in the first performance the disciplined action was Cage writing that sentence. The score of Variations III (1962) abounds in instructions to the performers, but makes no references to music, musical instruments, or sounds.

Many of the Variations and Cage's other 1960s pieces were "happenings", an art form established by Cage and his students in late 1950s. Cage's "Experimental Composition" classes at The New School influenced the formation of Fluxus, an international network of artists, composers, and designers. The majority of his students were visual artists and had little or no background in music. They included Jackson Mac Low, Allan Kaprow, Al Hansen, George Brecht, Ben Patterson, and Dick Higgins, as well as many others Cage invited unofficially. Famous pieces that resulted from the classes include George Brecht's Time Table Music and Al Hansen's Alice Denham in 48 Seconds. As set forth by Cage, "happenings" were theatrical events that abandon the traditional concept of stage-audience and occur without a sense of definite duration. Instead, they are left to chance. They have a minimal script, with no plot. In fact, a "happening" is so-named because it occurs in the present, attempting to arrest the concept of passing time. Cage believed that theater was the closest route to integrating art and real life. The term "happenings" was coined by Allan Kaprow, one of his students, who defined it as a genre in the late fifties. Cage met Kaprow while on a mushroom hunt with George Segal and invited him to join his class. In following these developments Cage was strongly influenced by Antonin Artaud's seminal treatise The Theatre and Its Double. In October 1960, Mary Bauermeister's Cologne studio hosted a joint concert by Cage and the video artist Nam June Paik (Cage's friend and mentee), who in the course of his performance of Etude for Piano cut off Cage's tie and then poured a bottle of shampoo over the heads of Cage and Tudor.

Cage's fame began to bleed into mainstream entertainment during this period, as seen in his 1960 appearance on I've Got a Secret where he performed his composition Water Walk.

In 1967, Cage's book A Year from Monday was first published by Wesleyan University Press. Cage's parents died during the decade: his father in 1964, and his mother in 1969. Cage had their ashes scattered in the Ramapo Mountains, near Stony Point, and asked for the same to be done to him after his death.

=== 1969–1987: New departures ===
During the 1960s, Cage produced some of his largest and most ambitious works, many of which reflected the era's utopian social ideals as well as his engagement with contemporary theories of media and technology. His reading of media theorist Marshall McLuhan on the cultural effects of new media, and architect Buckminster Fuller on the transformative potential of technology, informed several projects from this period. HPSCHD (1969), a large-scale multimedia work created in collaboration with composer and computer scientist Lejaren Hiller, combined seven harpsichords performing chance-determined excerpts from works by Cage, Hiller, and selections from the Western classical canon with 52 tapes of computer-generated sound. These were accompanied by 6,400 slides—many supplied by NASA—projected simultaneously from sixty-four slide projectors, as well as forty motion-picture films. The work was first presented in a five-hour performance at the University of Illinois Urbana-Champaign in 1969, where audience members were free to move around the space and enter or leave at any time.

Opening bars of Cheap Imitation (1969)
Performed by the composer in 1976, shortly before he had to retire from performing

Also in 1969, Cage produced his first fully notated work in years: Cheap Imitation for piano. The piece is a chance-controlled reworking of Erik Satie's Socrate, and, as both listeners and Cage himself noted, openly sympathetic to its source. Although Cage's affection for Satie's music was well-known, it was highly unusual for him to compose a personal work; when asked about this apparent contradiction, Cage replied: "Obviously, Cheap Imitation lies outside of what may seem necessary in my work in general, and that's disturbing. I'm the first to be disturbed by it." Cage's fondness for the piece resulted in a recording—a rare occurrence, since Cage disliked making recordings of his music—made in 1976. Overall, Cheap Imitation marked a major change in Cage's music: he turned again to writing fully notated works for traditional instruments, and tried out several new approaches, such as improvisation, which he previously discouraged.

Cheap Imitation became the last work Cage performed in public himself. Arthritis had troubled him since 1960, and by the early 1970s his hands were painfully swollen, rendering him unable to perform. Nevertheless, he still played Cheap Imitation during the 1970s, before finally having to give up performing. Preparing manuscripts also became difficult: before, published versions of pieces were done in Cage's calligraphic script; now, manuscripts for publication had to be completed by assistants. Matters were complicated further by David Tudor's departure from performing in the early 1970s. Tudor decided to concentrate on composition instead, and so Cage, for the first time in two decades, had to rely on other performers and their respective abilities. Such performers included Grete Sultan, Paul Zukofsky, Margaret Leng Tan, and many others. Aside from music, Cage continued writing books of prose and poetry (mesostics). M was first published by Wesleyan University Press in 1973. In January 1978 Cage was invited by Kathan Brown of Crown Point Press to engage in printmaking, and Cage would go on to produce series of prints every year until his death; these, together with some late watercolors, constitute the largest portion of his extant visual art. In 1979 Cage's Empty Words was first published by Wesleyan University Press.

=== 1987–1992: Final years and death ===
In 1987, Cage completed a piece called Two, for flute and piano, dedicated to performers Roberto Fabbriciani and Carlo Neri. The title referred to the number of performers needed; the music consisted of short notated fragments to be played at any tempo within the indicated time constraints. Cage went on to write some forty such Number Pieces, as they came to be known, usually employing a variant of the same technique; one of the last was Eighty (1992, premiered in Munich on October 28, 2011). The process of composition in many of the later Number Pieces, was simple selection of pitch range and pitches from that range, using chance procedures; the music has been linked to Cage's anarchic leanings. One^{11} (i.e., the eleventh piece for a single performer), completed in early 1992, was Cage's first and only foray into film. Cage conceived his last musical work with cellist and composer Michael Bach: "ONE13" for cello with curved bow and three loudspeakers, which was published years later.

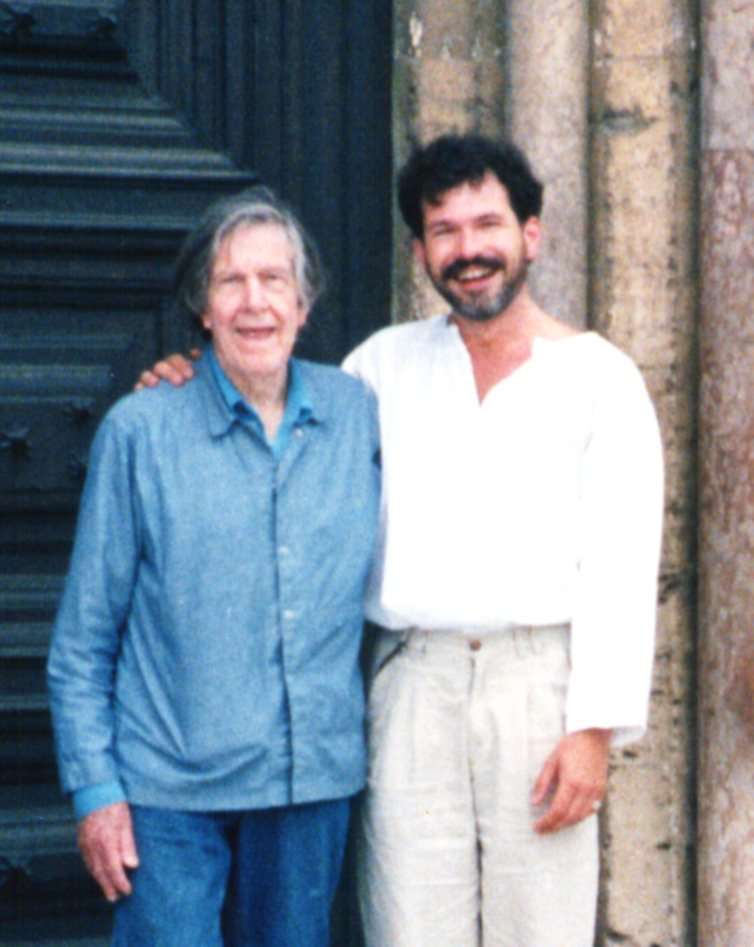
Cage (left) and Michael Bach in Assisi, Italy, 1992

Another new direction, also taken in 1987, was opera: Cage produced five operas, all sharing the same title Europera, between 1987 and 1991. Europeras I and II require greater resources than III, IV, and V, which are on a chamber scale. They were commissioned by the Oper Frankfurt to celebrate his 75th birthday, and according to music critic Mark Swed, they took "an enormous effort on the composer's part–requiring two full-time assistants and two computers humming day and night." These pieces caused quite a stir in the world of opera at the time with their unconventional methods for staging and sequencing. Many standard pieces of operatic repertoire were used, but not in any preset order; rather, they were selected by chance, meaning no two performances were exactly alike. Many of those who were to be a part of these performances refused to participate, citing the impossibility of the requests Cage was making. Days before Europeras I and II were to be premiered, Frankfurt's opera house was damaged by fire, setting into motion a series of setbacks leading to a theatrical run met with mixed reactions, including a performance that led Cage to write a letter to the musicians criticizing their interpretation of the work.

Over the course of the 1980s, Cage's health worsened progressively. He suffered not only from arthritis, but also from sciatica and arteriosclerosis. He had a stroke that left the movement of his left leg restricted, and, in 1985, broke an arm. During this time, Cage pursued a macrobiotic diet. Nevertheless, ever since arthritis started plaguing him, the composer was aware of his age, and, as biographer David Revill observed, "the fire which he began to incorporate in his visual work in 1985 is not only the fire he has set aside for so long—the fire of passion—but also fire as transitoriness and fragility." On August 11, 1992, while preparing evening tea for himself and Cunningham, Cage had another stroke. He was taken to St. Vincent's Hospital in Manhattan, where he died on the morning of August 12, aged 79.

According to his wishes, Cage's body was cremated and his ashes scattered in the Ramapo Mountains near Stony Point, New York, at the same place where he had scattered the ashes of his parents. His death occurred only weeks before a celebration of his 80th birthday organized in Frankfurt by composer Walter Zimmermann and musicologist Stefan Schaedler. The event went ahead as planned, including a performance of the Concert for Piano and Orchestra by David Tudor and Ensemble Modern. Cunningham died of natural causes in July 2009.

== Music ==
=== Early works, rhythmic structure, and new approaches to harmony ===
Cage's first completed pieces have been lost. According to the composer, the earliest works were very short pieces for piano, composed using complex mathematical procedures and lacking in "sensual appeal and expressive power." Cage then started producing pieces by improvising and writing down the results, until Richard Buhlig stressed to him the importance of structure. Most works from the early 1930s, such as Sonata for Clarinet (1933) and Composition for 3 Voices (1934), are highly chromatic and betray Cage's interest in counterpoint. Around the same time, the composer also developed a type of a tone row technique with 25-note rows. After studies with Schoenberg, who never taught dodecaphony to his students, Cage developed another tone row technique, in which the row was split into short motives, which would then be repeated and transposed according to a set of rules. This approach was first used in Two Pieces for Piano (c. 1935), and then, with modifications, in larger works such as Metamorphosis and Five Songs (both 1938).

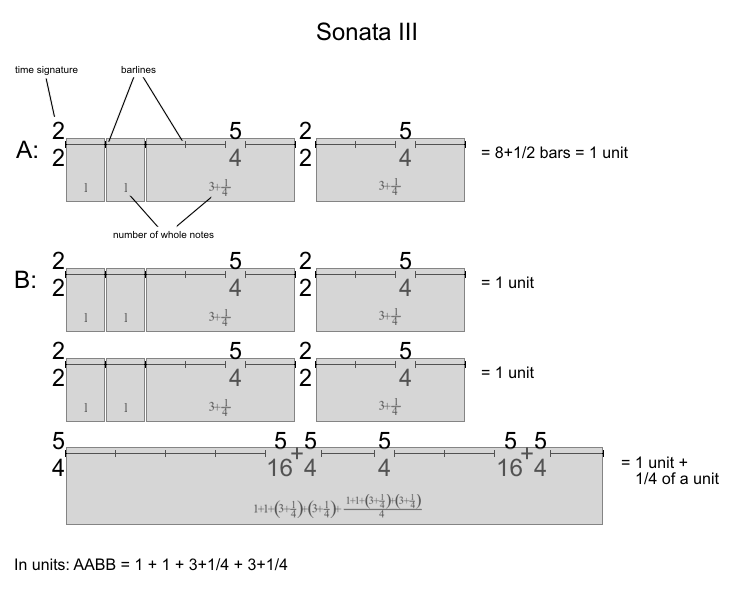
Rhythmic proportions in Sonata III of Sonatas and Interludes for prepared piano

Soon after Cage started writing percussion music and music for modern dance, he started using a technique that placed the rhythmic structure of the piece into the foreground. In Imaginary Landscape No. 1 (1939) there are four large sections of 16, 17, 18, and 19 bars, and each section is divided into four subsections, the first three of which were all 5 bars long. First Construction (in Metal) (1939) expands on the concept: there are five sections of 4, 3, 2, 3, and 4 units respectively. Each unit contains 16 bars, and is divided the same way: 4 bars, 3 bars, 2 bars, etc. Finally, the musical content of the piece is based on sixteen motives. Such "nested proportions", as Cage called them, became a regular feature of his music throughout the 1940s. The technique was elevated to great complexity in later pieces such as Sonatas and Interludes for prepared piano (1946–48), in which many proportions used non-integer numbers (1¼, ¾, 1¼, ¾, 1½, and 1½ for Sonata I, for example), or A Flower, a song for voice and closed piano, in which two sets of proportions are used simultaneously.

In late 1940s, Cage started developing further methods of breaking away with traditional harmony. For instance, in String Quartet in Four Parts (1950) Cage first composed a number of gamuts: chords with fixed instrumentation. The piece progresses from one gamut to another. In each instance the gamut was selected only based on whether it contains the note necessary for the melody, and so the rest of the notes do not form any directional harmony. Concerto for prepared piano (1950–51) used a system of charts of durations, dynamics, melodies, etc., from which Cage would choose using simple geometric patterns. The last movement of the concerto was a step towards using chance procedures, which Cage adopted soon afterwards.

=== Chance ===
A chart system was also used (along with nested proportions) for the large piano work Music of Changes (1951), only here material would be selected from the charts by using the I Ching. All of Cage's music since 1951 was composed using chance procedures, most commonly using the I Ching. For example, works from Music for Piano were based on paper imperfections: the imperfections themselves provided pitches, coin tosses and I Ching hexagram numbers were used to determine the accidentals, clefs, and playing techniques. A whole series of works was created by applying chance operations, i.e. the I Ching, to star charts: Atlas Eclipticalis (1961–62), and a series of etudes: Etudes Australes (1974–75), Freeman Etudes (1977–90), and Etudes Boreales (1978). Cage's etudes are all extremely difficult to perform, a characteristic dictated by Cage's social and political views: the difficulty would ensure that "a performance would show that the impossible is not impossible"—this being Cage's answer to the notion that solving the world's political and social problems is impossible. Cage described himself as an anarchist, and was influenced by Henry David Thoreau. (Note: Cage self-identified as an anarchist in a 1985 interview: "I'm an anarchist. I don't know whether the adjective is pure and simple, or philosophical, or what, but I don't like government! And I don't like institutions! And I don't have any confidence in even good institutions.")

Beginning of Etude No. 18, from Book II of Freeman Etudes

Another series of works applied chance procedures to pre-existing music by other composers: Cheap Imitation (1969; based on Erik Satie), Some of "The Harmony of Maine" (1978; based on Belcher), and Hymns and Variations (1979). In these works, Cage would borrow the rhythmic structure of the originals and fill it with pitches determined through chance procedures, or just replace some of the originals' pitches. Yet another series of works, the so-called Number Pieces, all completed during the last five years of the composer's life, make use of time brackets: the score consists of short fragments with indications of when to start and to end them (e.g. from anywhere between 1′15" and 1′45", and to anywhere from 2′00" to 2′30").

Cage's method of using the I Ching was far from simple randomization. The procedures varied from composition to composition, and were usually complex. For example, in the case of Cheap Imitation, the exact questions asked to the I Ching were these:

1. Which of the seven modes, if we take as modes the seven scales beginning on white notes and remaining on white notes, which of those am I using?
2. Which of the twelve possible chromatic transpositions am I using?
3. For this phrase for which this transposition of this mode will apply, which note am I using of the seven to imitate the note that Satie wrote?

In another example of late music by Cage, Etudes Australes, the compositional procedure involved placing a transparent strip on the star chart, identifying the pitches from the chart, transferring them to paper, then asking the I Ching which of these pitches were to remain single, and which should become parts of aggregates (chords), and the aggregates were selected from a table of some 550 possible aggregates, compiled beforehand.

Finally, some of Cage's works, particularly those completed during the 1960s, feature instructions to the performer, rather than fully notated music. The score of Variations I (1958) presents the performer with six transparent squares, one with points of various sizes, five with five intersecting lines. The performer combines the squares and uses lines and points as a coordinate system, in which the lines are axes of various characteristics of the sounds, such as lowest frequency, simplest overtone structure, etc. Some of Cage's graphic scores (e.g. Concert for Piano and Orchestra, Fontana Mix (both 1958)) present the performer with similar difficulties. Still other works from the same period consist just of text instructions. The score of 0′00″ (1962; also known as 4′33″ No. 2) consists of a single sentence: "In a situation provided with maximum amplification, perform a disciplined action." The first performance had Cage write that sentence.

Musicircus (1967) simply invites the performers to assemble and play together. The first Musicircus featured multiple performers and groups in a large space who were all to commence and stop playing at two particular time periods, with instructions on when to play individually or in groups within these two periods. The result was a mass superimposition of many different musics on top of one another as determined by chance distribution, producing an event with a specifically theatric feel. Many Musicircuses have subsequently been held, and continue to occur even after Cage's death. The English National Opera (ENO) became the first opera company to hold a Cage Musicircus on March 3, 2012, at the London Coliseum. The ENO's Musicircus featured artists including Led Zeppelin bassist John Paul Jones and composer Michael Finnissy alongside ENO music director Edward Gardner, the ENO Community Choir, ENO Opera Works singers, and a collective of professional and amateur talents performing in the bars and front of house at London's Coliseum Opera House.

This concept of circus was to remain important to Cage throughout his life and featured strongly in such pieces as Roaratorio (1979), a many-tiered rendering in sound of both his text Writing for the Second Time Through Finnegans Wake and traditional musical and field recordings made around Ireland. The piece was based on James Joyce's 1939 experimental novel Finnegans Wake, which was one of Cage's favorite books, and one from which he derived texts for several more of his works.

=== Improvisation ===
Since chance procedures were used by Cage to eliminate the composer's and the performer's likes and dislikes from music, Cage disliked the concept of improvisation, which is inevitably linked to the performer's preferences. In a number of works beginning in the 1970s, he found ways to incorporate improvisation. In Child of Tree (1975) and Branches (1976) the performers are asked to use certain species of plants as instruments, for example the cactus. The structure of the pieces is determined through the chance of their choices, as is the musical output; the performers had no knowledge of the instruments. In Inlets (1977) the performers play large water-filled conch shells – by carefully tipping the shell several times, it is possible to achieve a bubble forming inside, which produced sound. Yet, as it is impossible to predict when this would happen, the performers had to continue tipping the shells – as a result the performance was dictated by pure chance.

== Visual art, writings, and other activities ==
Variations III, No. 14, a 1992 print by Cage from a series of 57

Although Cage started painting in his youth, he gave it up to concentrate on music instead. His first mature visual project, Not Wanting to Say Anything About Marcel, dates from 1969. The work comprises two lithographs and a group of what Cage called plexigrams: silk screen printing on plexiglas panels. The panels and the lithographs all consist of bits and pieces of words in different typefaces, all governed by chance operations.

From 1978 to his death, Cage worked at Crown Point Press, producing series of prints every year. The earliest project completed there was the etching Score Without Parts (1978), created from fully notated instructions, and based on various combinations of drawings by Henry David Thoreau. This was followed, the same year, by Seven Day Diary, which Cage drew with his eyes closed, but which conformed to a strict structure developed using chance operations. Finally, Thoreau's drawings informed the last works produced in 1978, Signals.

Between 1979 and 1982, Cage produced a number of large series of prints: Changes and Disappearances (1979–80), On the Surface (1980–82), and Déreau (1982). These were the last works in which he used engraving. In 1983 he started using various unconventional materials such as cotton batting, foam, etc., and then used stones and fire (Eninka, Variations, Ryoanji, etc.) to create his visual works. In 1988–1990, he produced watercolors at the Mountain Lake Workshop.

In the 1980s, Cage participated in the Mountain Lake Workshop, an experimental art symposium directed by Virginia Tech professor Ray Kass in southwestern Virginia. There, he produced a series of collaborative visual works that extended his interest in chance operations, including large-scale watercolor and print projects. Beginning in 1983, he worked with watercolors using methods such as controlled pours, chance-derived grids, and painting around stones with brushes made from feathers, techniques that emphasized indeterminacy within a structured process. The workshops allowed Cage to apply his musical concepts to visual art, and this period became a notable part of his late visual art practice. It is documented in The Mountain Lake Symposium and Workshop: Art in Locale (2018).

The only film Cage produced was one of the Number Pieces, One^{11}, commissioned by composer and film director Henning Lohner, who worked with Cage to produce and direct the 90-minute monochrome film. It was completed only weeks before his death in 1992. One^{11} consists entirely of images of chance-determined play of electric light. It premiered in Cologne on September 19, 1992, accompanied by a live performance of the orchestra piece 103.

Throughout his adult life, Cage was also active as lecturer and writer. Some of his lectures were included in several books he published, the first of which was Silence: Lectures and Writings (1961). Silence included not only simple lectures, but also texts executed in experimental layouts, and works such as Lecture on Nothing (1949), which were composed in rhythmic structures. Subsequent books also featured different types of content, from lectures on music to poetry—Cage's mesostics.

Cage was also an avid amateur mycologist. In the fall of 1969, he gave a lecture on the subject of edible mushrooms at the University of California, Davis, as part of his "Music in Dialogue" course. He co-founded the New York Mycological Society with four friends, and his mycology collection is presently housed by the Special Collections department of the McHenry Library at the University of California, Santa Cruz.

== Reception and influence ==
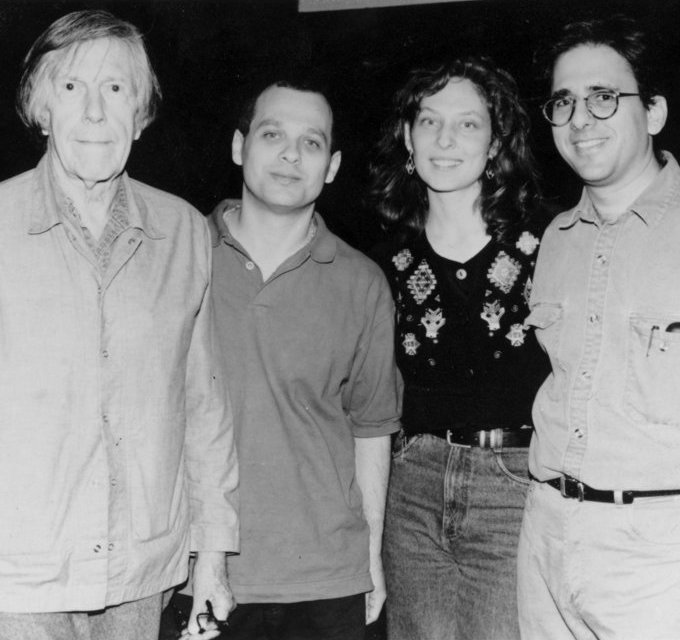
Cage with composers David Lang, Julia Wolfe, and Michael Gordon in 1982

Cage's pre-chance works, particularly pieces from the late 1940s such as Sonatas and Interludes, earned critical acclaim: the Sonatas were performed at Carnegie Hall in 1949. Cage's adoption of chance operations in 1951 cost him a number of friendships and led to numerous criticisms from fellow composers. Adherents of serialism such as Pierre Boulez and Karlheinz Stockhausen dismissed indeterminate music; Boulez, who was once on friendly terms with Cage, criticized him for "adoption of a philosophy tinged with Orientalism that masks a basic weakness in compositional technique." Prominent critics of serialism, such as the Greek-French composer Iannis Xenakis, were similarly hostile towards Cage: for Xenakis, the adoption of chance in music was "an abuse of language and ... an abrogation of a composer's function."

An article by teacher and critic Michael Steinberg, Tradition and Responsibility, criticized avant-garde music in general:

The rise of music that is totally without social commitment also increases the separation between composer and public, and represents still another form of departure from tradition. The cynicism with which this particular departure seems to have been made is perfectly symbolized in John Cage's account of a public lecture he had given: "Later, during the question period, I gave one of six previously prepared answers regardless of the question asked. This was a reflection of my engagement in Zen." While Mr. Cage's famous silent piece [i.e. 4′33″], or his Landscapes for a dozen radio receivers may be of little interest as music, they are of enormous importance historically as representing the complete abdication of the artist's power.

Cage's aesthetic position was criticized by, among others, prominent writer and critic Douglas Kahn. In his 1999 book Noise, Water, Meat: A History of Sound in the Arts, Kahn acknowledged the influence Cage had on culture, but noted that "one of the central effects of Cage's battery of silencing techniques was a silencing of the social."

While much of Cage's work remains controversial, his influence on countless composers, artists, and writers is notable. After Cage introduced chance procedures to his works, Boulez, Stockhausen, and Xenakis remained critical, yet all adopted chance procedures in some of their works (although in a much more restricted manner). Stockhausen's piano writing in his later Klavierstücke was influenced by Cage's Music of Changes and David Tudor. Other composers who adopted chance procedures in their works included Witold Lutosławski, Mauricio Kagel, and many others. Music in which some of the composition and/or performance is left to chance was labelled aleatoric music—a term popularized by Boulez. Helmut Lachenmann's musique concrète instrumentale was influenced by Cage's work with extended techniques.

Cage's rhythmic structure experiments and his interest in sound influenced a number of composers, starting at first with his close American associates Earle Brown, Morton Feldman, and Christian Wolff (and other American composers, such as La Monte Young, Terry Riley, Steve Reich, and Philip Glass), and then spreading to Europe. For example, many composers of the English experimental school acknowledge his influence: Michael Parsons, Christopher Hobbs, John White, Gavin Bryars, who studied under Cage briefly, and Howard Skempton. The Japanese composer Tōru Takemitsu has also cited Cage's influence.

In 1986, Cage received an honorary doctorate from the California Institute of the Arts. Cage is a 1989 Kyoto Prize Laureate; the prize was established by Kazuo Inamori. The John Cage Award was endowed and established in 1992 by Foundation for Contemporary Arts in honor of the late composer, with recipients including Meredith Monk, Robert Ashley, and Toshi Ichiyanagi.

Following Cage's death Simon Jeffes, founder of the Penguin Cafe Orchestra, composed a piece entitled "CAGE DEAD", using a melody based on the notes contained in the title, in the order they appear: C, A, G, E, D, E, A and D.

Cage's influence was also acknowledged by rock acts such as Sonic Youth (who performed some of the Number Pieces) and Stereolab (who named their song "John Cage Bubblegum" after him), composer and rock and jazz guitarist Frank Zappa, and various noise music artists and bands: musicologist Paul Hegarty traced the origin of noise music to 4′33″. The development of electronic music was also influenced by Cage: in the mid-1970s Brian Eno's label Obscure Records released works by Cage. Prepared piano, which Cage popularized, is featured heavily on Aphex Twin's 2001 album Drukqs. Cage's work as musicologist helped popularize Erik Satie's music, and his friendship with Abstract expressionist artists such as Robert Rauschenberg helped introduce his ideas into visual art. Cage's ideas also found their way into sound design: for example, Academy Award-winning sound designer Gary Rydstrom cited Cage's work as a major influence. Radiohead undertook a composing and performing collaboration with Cunningham's dance troupe in 2003 because the music-group's leader Thom Yorke considered Cage one of his "all-time art heroes". In The Tragically Hip's 2000 song Tiger the Lion from their album Music @ Work, lyricist Gord Downie refers to Cage and his theories.

=== Centenary commemoration ===
Live performance of Cage's 4´33´´ by the Eikanger-Bjørsvik brass band at the Borealis festival in Bergen, March 2012

In 2012, among a wide range of American and international centennial celebrations, an eight-day festival was held in Washington DC, with venues found notably more among the city's art museums and universities than performance spaces. Earlier in the centennial year, conductor Michael Tilson Thomas presented Cage's Song Books with the San Francisco Symphony at Carnegie Hall in New York. Another celebration came, for instance, in Darmstadt, Germany, which in July 2012 renamed its central station the John Cage Railway Station during the term of its annual new-music courses.

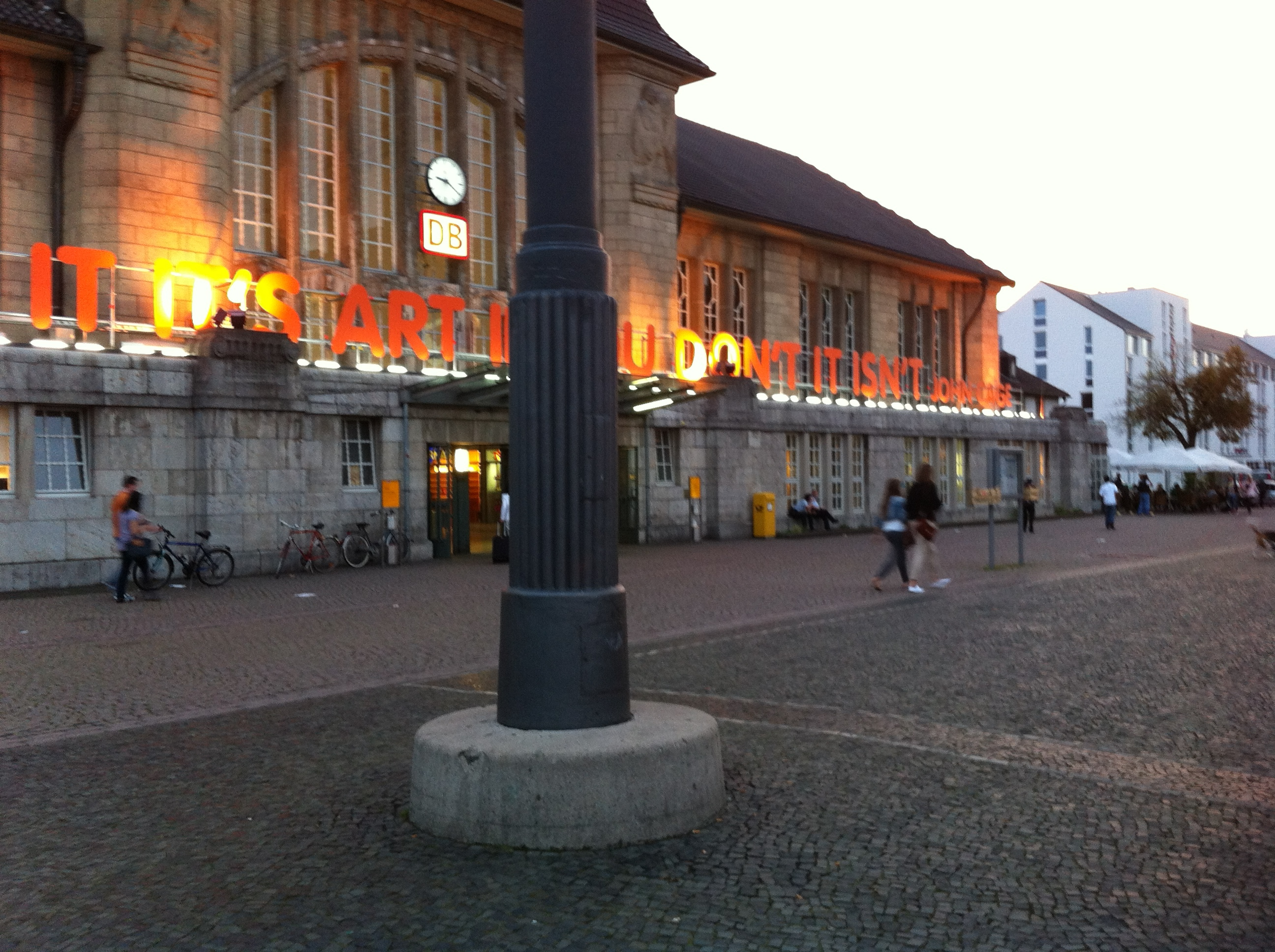
Darmstadt Hauptbahnhof Celebrates John Cage

At the Ruhrtriennale in Germany, Heiner Goebbels staged a production of Europeras 1 & 2 in a 36,000 sq ft converted factory and commissioned a production of Lecture on Nothing created and performed by Robert Wilson.[157] Jacaranda Music had four concerts planned in Santa Monica, California, for the centennial week.[158][159] John Cage Day was the name given to several events held during 2012 to mark the centenary of his birth.

A 2012 project was curated by Juraj Kojs to celebrate the centenary of Cage's birth, titled On Silence: Homage to Cage. It consisted of 13 commissioned works created by composers from around the globe such as Kasia Glowicka, Adrian Knight and Henry Vega, each being 4 minutes and 33 seconds long in honor of Cage's famous 1952 opus, 4′33″. The program was supported by the Foundation for Emerging Technologies and Arts, Laura Kuhn and the John Cage Trust.

In a homage to Cage's dance work, the Bill T. Jones/Arnie Zane Dance Company in July 2012 "performed an engrossing piece called 'Story/Time'. It was modeled on Cage's 1958 work 'Indeterminacy', in which [Cage and then Jones, respectively,] sat alone onstage, reading aloud ... series of one-minute stories [they]'d written. Dancers from Jones's company performed as [Jones] read."

== Archives ==
- The archive of the John Cage Trust is held at Bard College in upstate New York.
- The John Cage Music Manuscript Collection held by the Music Division of the New York Public Library for the Performing Arts contains most of the composer's musical manuscripts, including sketches, worksheets, realizations, and unfinished works.
- The John Cage Papers are held in the Special Collections and Archives department of Wesleyan University's Olin Library in Middletown, Connecticut. They contain manuscripts, interviews, fan mail, and ephemera. Other material includes clippings, gallery and exhibition catalogs, a collection of Cage's books and serials, posters, objects, exhibition and literary announcement postcards, and brochures from conferences and other organizations
- The John Cage Collection at Northwestern University in Illinois contains the composer's correspondence, ephemera, and the Notations collection.
- The John Cage Materials are held within the Oral History of American Music (OHAM) collection of the Irving S. Gilmore Library at Yale University.

== See also ==
- An Anthology of Chance Operations
- List of compositions by John Cage
- The Organ^{2}/ASLSP (a.k.a. As Slow as Possible) project, the longest concert ever created.
- The Revenge of the Dead Indians, a 1993 documentary about Cage by Henning Lohner.
- Works for prepared piano by John Cage

== Notes, references, sources ==
=== Sources ===
- Bernstein, David W.; Hatch, Christopher, eds. (2001). Writings through John Cage's Music, Poetry, and Art. University of Chicago Press. ISBN 978-0-226-04407-1.
- Bredow, Moritz von (2012). Rebellische Pianistin. Das Leben der Grete Sultan zwischen Berlin und New York. Mainz, Germany: Schott Music. ISBN 978-3-7957-0800-9.
- Cage, John (1973) [1961]. Silence: Lectures and Writings. Wesleyan University Press. ISBN 978-0-8195-6028-5.
- Fetterman, William (1996). John Cage's Theatre Pieces: Notations and Performances. Routledge. ISBN 978-3-7186-5643-1.
- Haskins, Rob (2004). "An Anarchic Society of Sounds": The Number Pieces of John Cage (PhD dissertation, Musicology). Eastman School of Music, University of Rochester.
- Kostelanetz, Richard (2003). Conversing with John Cage. Routledge. ISBN 978-0-415-93792-4.
- Lejeunne, Denis (2012). The Radical Use of Chance in 20th Century Art. Amsterdam: Rodopi Press. ISBN 978-94-012-0726-3.
- Nicholls, David, ed. (2002). The Cambridge Companion to John Cage. Cambridge University Press. ISBN 978-0-521-78968-4.
- Perloff, Marjorie; Junkerman, Charles (1994). John Cage: Composed in America. University of Chicago Press. ISBN 978-0-226-66057-8.
- Pritchett, James (1993). The Music of John Cage. Cambridge University Press. ISBN 978-0-521-56544-8.
- Pritchett, James; Kuhn, Laura; Garrett, Charles Hiroshi (2012). "Cage, John". Grove Music Online (8th ed.). Oxford University Press. doi:10.1093/gmo/9781561592630.article.A2223954. ISBN 978-1-56159-263-0. (subscription, Wikilibrary access, or UK public library membership required)
- Revill, David (1993). The Roaring Silence: John Cage – a Life. Arcade Publishing. ISBN 978-1-55970-220-1.
