= Paul Zukofsky =

- Born: October 22, 1943; Brooklyn, New York
- Died: June 6, 2017 (aged 73) Hong Kong
- Genres: Classical, Avant-garde
- Occupations: soloist, conductor, instructor
- Instrument: violin
- Years active: 1956–2017

Paul Zukofsky (October 22, 1943 – June 6, 2017) was an American violinist and conductor known for his work in the field of contemporary classical music.

== Career ==
Born in Brooklyn, New York, Paul Zukofsky was the only child of the American objectivist poet Louis Zukofsky and Celia Thaew Zukofsky, a musician and composer. Both parents were children of Yiddish-speaking immigrants from what was then the western Russian Empire (now Belarus). Revealing a precocious talent, he began taking music lessons at age three, soon concentrated on the violin, and at seven became a student of Ivan Galamian at the Juilliard School of Music. He made his first orchestral appearance in 1952 with the New Haven Symphony Orchestra, and a formal debut recital at Carnegie Hall in 1956. The New York Times praised his technique, noting he had gone through "a difficult program without turning a hair or moving a facial muscle" and described him as a "deadpan bundle of talent." Further Carnegie Hall recitals followed in 1959 and 1961. Louis Zukofsky published a fictionalized biography of his son as a young violinist, Little (1970), which includes an account of the ten-year-old Paul Zukofsky playing for the poet Ezra Pound, who was then incarcerated in St. Elizabeths prison-asylum in Washington, D.C.

While he performed and recorded a broad range of classical music, Zukofsky had little interest in pursuing the typical career of a violin virtuoso and gravitated toward music he felt was underappreciated. As one succinct description puts it: "From his earliest years he was fascinated by ultramodern music and developed maximal celerity, dexterity, and alacrity in manipulating special techniques, in effect transforming the violin into a multimedia instrument beyond its normal capacities." He is best known for his performances of and collaborations with many of the key composers of contemporary classical music, such as Milton Babbitt, Arthur Berger, Easley Blackwood, Henry Brant, John Cage, Elliott Carter, George Crumb, Morton Feldman, Philip Glass, Peter Mennin, Krzysztof Penderecki, Walter Piston, J. K. Randall, Wallingford Riegger, Giacinto Scelsi, Artur Schnabel, Roger Sessions, Ralph Shapey, Harvey Sollberger, Stefan Wolpe, Charles Wuorinen, and Iannis Xenakis. He gave world premieres of concertos by Roger Sessions (for violin, cello and orchestra), Charles Wuorinen (for amplified violin and orchestra), Morton Feldman (for violin and orchestra), Philip Glass, and the Scottish composer Iain Hamilton, among others.

Zukofsky appeared as the character of Albert Einstein in Philip Glass's opera Einstein on the Beach in 1976, and performed on a number of other Glass recordings. He also had a significant collaborative relationship with John Cage. They worked together and recorded the violin version of Cage's Cheap Imitation (1977), and Cage composed the demanding Freeman Etudes – Books I and II (Etudes I–XVII, 1977–1980) specifically for Zukofsky.

In 1975 Zukofsky founded Musical Observations, a nonprofit corporation to support neglected but worthwhile projects, including the recording label CP^{2}, which continues to make available many recordings for which he performed, conducted and edited. From 1976 to 1977, Zukofsky was a resident visitor at the Bell Laboratories, Murray Hill, New Jersey, participating in research on timing in musical performance.

As a teacher, Zukofsky taught at many major music schools and programs, including the Juilliard School (where he taught chamber music, conducting and violin), the New England Conservatory, the Berkshire Music Center, the Manhattan School of Music, and Stony Brook University. He was one of the original Creative Associates at the founding of the Center for Creative and Performing Arts, SUNY Buffalo, in 19674. Zukofsky served as artistic director for the Museum of Modern Art (NYC) Summergarden concert series from 1987 to 1992, and he was program coordinator of the American Composer Series at the Kennedy Center from 1980 until 1990.

Over the course of the 1970s, Zukofsky increasingly devoted his energies to conducting. From 1978 to 1987 he was conductor of the Colonial Symphony Orchestra (Madison, New Jersey). In the mid-1970s Zukofsky initiated what proved to be a long-standing musical association with Iceland. In 1977, he led the Zukofsky Seminars in Orchestral Music offering the opportunity for music students to perform large scale works. These evolved into the founding in 1985 of the Youth Symphony Orchestra of Iceland (Sinfóníuhljómsveit Æskunnar) of which he was Principal Conductor and Music Director until 1993, giving a large number of Icelandic premieres of primarily 20th century orchestral music. In recognition of his long-standing association with and contributions to Icelandic music, Zukofsky received the Minningarverðlaun D.V. (Cultural Achievement Award in Music) in 1988, as well as the Knight's Cross, Icelandic Order of the Falcon by the President of Iceland in 1990.

From 1992 to 1996, Zukofsky was director of the Arnold Schoenberg Institute at the University of Southern California. During this time a dispute between Schoenberg's heirs and the university concerning the mission of the institute resulted in the relocation and rehousing of the Schoenberg's archive at the Arnold Schönberg Center in Vienna, Austria, in 1998.

== Recordings ==
Zukofsky recorded extensively as both violinist and conductor. These include some notable renditions of classics, such as Paganini's Twenty-four Caprices and Bach's Sonatas and Partitas for Violin. In 1974 he recorded an anthology of new American violin music composed between 1940 and 1970, and the following year interpretations of classic rags. However, his primary focus was on contemporary classical music and with always an interest in championing work he believed was underappreciated, such as that of Artur Schnabel and Armin Loos.

== Executor ==
As the copyright holder for his parents' work, Zukofsky gained a reputation as a restrictive and contentious guardian of his property rights, joining a list of literary estates that have taken a controlling and often confrontational position with regard to scholars, of which perhaps the most notorious has been the James Joyce estate. In 2009 he published a provocative open letter online discouraging students and scholars from publishing on his father's work. The letter evidences his strong animus against academics and suspicion of their motives. On the other hand, he kept the considerable body of his father's work in print and supported the publication of several volumes of correspondence, so that there has been far better access to the work than at any time during his father's lifetime. Zukofsky's narrow interpretation of fair use has been strongly contested by legal scholars.

== Death ==
Zukofsky's cosmopolitan interests included a life-long fascination with East Asia, not least its food. He did a significant amount of recording in Japan and had long associations, especially with composers Jo Kondo and Yuji Takahashi. In 2006 he moved permanently to Asia, initially to Bangkok and then for the last decade of his life in Hong Kong, where he continued to be musically active and also worked on his inimitable critical writings, mostly on music. Zukofsky died of non-Hodgkin lymphoma on June 6, 2017, in Hong Kong. He left no immediate survivors.

== Works ==
=== Writings ===
- Zukofsky, Paul (1976). "On Violin Harmonics." In Perspectives on Notation and Performance ed. Benjamin Boretz and Edward T. Cone (New York: Norton, 1976). Essays reprinted from issues of Perspectives of New Music. ISBN 0-393-02190-4. ISBN 978-0-393-02190-5.

=== Selected discography ===
A more detailed discography is available at the Musical Observations website.

==== As violinist ====
- William Sydeman: Concerto da Camera No. 2 (1964).
- Charles Ives: The Sonatas for Violin and Piano, Volumes 1 & 2. Gilbert Kalish, piano (1965).
- Roger Sessions: Violin Concerto (1968).
- Busoni: Concerto for Violin and Orchestra in D major (1968).
- Michale Sahl: Mitzvah for the Dead / J.K. Randall: Lyric Variations for Violin and Computer (1968).
- Krzystof Penderecki: Capriccio for Violin and Orchestra (1969).
- Steve Reich: Violin Phase (1969).
- Richard Hoffmann: String Trio / Donald Martino: Fantasy Variations for Violin; Trio for Violin, Clarinet and Piano (1969).
- Charles Ives: Chamber Music (1970).
- Charles Wuorinen: Duo for Violin and Piano (1970).
- Phillip Rhodes: Duo for Violin and Cello (1971).
- Paganini: The Twenty-Four Caprices for Solo Violin (complete) (1971).
- William Schuman: Violin Concerto (1971).
- Yuji Takahashi: Six Stoichea (1972).
- Earle Brown: String Quartet (1972).
- George Crumb: Black Angels for Electric String Quartet / Charles Jones: String Quartet No. 6; Sonatina for Violin and Piano (1972).
- New Music for Violin and Piano. George Crumb: Four Nocturnes for
- Violin and Piano (Night Music II) / Isang Yun: Gasa / Charles Wuorinen: The Long and Short / John Cage: Six Melodies for Violin and Keyboard (1973).
- Donald Harris: Fantasy for Violin and Piano / Lawrence Moss: Elegy; Time Piece (1973).
- J. S. Bach: Six Sonatas and Partitas for Violin (unaccompanied) (1974).
- Charles Ives: Sonatas for Violin and Piano (Plus Largo), Gilbert Kalish, piano (1974).
- Music for a 20th Century Violinist: An Anthology of Three Decades of American Music, 1940–1950–1960: Milton Babbitt: Sextets / Arthur Berger: Duo No. 2 / Henry Brant: Quombex / Cage: Nocturne / George Crumb: Night Music II / Morton Feldman: Vertical Thoughts 2 / Peter Mennin: Sonata Concertante / Walter Piston: Sonatina / Michael Sahl: String Quartet / Roger Sessions: Duo / Ralph Shapey: Evocation / Harvey Sollberger: Solos / Wallingford Riegger: Sonatina / Stefan Wolpe: Second Piece for Violin Alone (1974).
- Brahms: Complete Sonatas for Violin and Piano, including Sonatensatz. Yuji Takahashi, piano (1975).
- A Prospect of Contemporary Violin Music. Toru Takemitsu: Hika / Yuji Takahashi: Rosace 1½ / Hikaru Hayashi: Winter on 72nd Street (Second Rhapsody) / John Cage: Nocturne; Six Melodies for Violin and Keyboard (1975).
- Elliott Carter: Duo for Violin and Piano (1975).
- Classic Rags and Other Novelties, arr. Paul Zukofsky and Robert Dennis, piano. Scott Joplin: The Easy Winner; Felicity Rag; Magnetic Rag; Stoptime Rag / Zez Confrey: Grandfather's Clock / Joseph Lamb: American Beauty / Luckey Roberts: Pork and Beans / James Scott: Calliope Rag / Clarence Woods: Sleepy Hollow Rag; Slippery Elm (1975).
- Giacinto Scelsi: Anahit / Philip Glass: Strung Out / Iannis Xenakis: Mikka; Mikka "S" (1976).
- Easley Blackwood: Second Sonata for Violin and Piano / Roger Sessions: Sonata for Violin (1977).
- Joel Chadabe: Echoes; Flowers (1977).
- Philip Glass: Einstein on the Beach (violin solos) (1978).
- The Art of Paul Zukofsky. Joji Yuasa: My Blue Sky, No. 3 / Jo Kondo: Retard / Toshi Ichiyanagi: Scenes I for Violin and Piano / Maki Ishii: Lost Sounds I (Version B) / Yuji Takahashi: For You I Sing This Song (1979).
- John Cage: Chorals; Cheap Imitation (1981).
- Morton Feldman: Spring of Chosroes / Artur Schnabel: Sonata for Violin and Piano (1981).
- Edward Steuermann: Dialogues for Violin Solo; Improvisation and Allegro (1981).
- John Cage: Freeman Etudes I–VII (1983).
- Philip Glass: The Photographer (violin solos) (1983).
- New Music from the University of Iowa. Charles Wuorinen: Concerto for Amplified Violin and Orchestra (1983).
- Morton Feldman: For John Cage (1984).
- Artur Schnabel: Sonata for Solo Violin (1985).
- The Min-On Contemporary Music Festival '83. Toshi Ichiyanagi: Violin Concerto "Jundansuru Fukei" (Circulating Scenery) (1993).
- Charles Wuorinen: Concerto for Amplified Violin and Orchestra (2004).
- Armin Loos: Sonata No. 2 (2004).

==== As conductor ====
- Glenn Lieberman: Music for Ten Stringed Instruments. New York String Ensemble (1983).
- John Cage: Sixteen Dances (1984).
- Karόlína Eiríksdóttir: Sinfonietta / Þorkell Sigurbjörnsson: Mistur (Mist ) / Atli Heimir Sveinsson: Hreinn: Gallery Súm 1974 / Jónas Tómasson: Orgía. Iceland Symphony Orchestra (1986).
- Roger Sessions: Orchestral Suite from the Black Maskers. The Juilliard Orchestra (1988).
- Milton Babbitt: Relata I. The Juilliard Orchestra (1990).
- Artur Schnabel: Symphony No. 2. The Royal Philharmonic (1991).
- Jón Leifs: Visions and Images. Geysir; Hekla; Landsyn; Three Images. Iceland Symphony Orchestra (1991).
- Jón Nordal: Portrait. Adagio; Concerto Lirico; Epitafion; Tvisöngur. The Reykjavik Chamber Orchestra (1991).
- Arnold Schoenberg: Pelleas and Melisande. Sinfóníuhljómsveit Æskunnar (1992).
- Jón Leifs: Baldr, Op. 34. Sinfóníuhljómsveit Æskunnar (1992).
- Dane Rudhyar: Five Stanzas. Colonial Symphony (1995).
- Artur Schnabel: Symphony No. 1. BBC Orchestra / Symphony No. 3. Prague Symphony Orchestra (1996).
- Artur Schnabel: Dance And Secret & Joy And Peace. Gregg Smith Singers & a N.Y. Orchestra (1996).
- Atli Heimir Sveinsson: Timinn og Vatnið (Time and Water). Reykjavik Chamber Orchestra (2002).
- Milton Babbitt: Fourplay; Septet but Equal / Morton Feldman: Instruments 1; Three Clarinets, Cello, and Piano. Composers Ensemble, London (2004).
- Jo Kondo: Hagoromo. The London Sinfonietta (2004).
- Jo Kondo: Mulberry; In The Woods; In Summer. The Tokyo Metropolitan Orchestra (2007).
