= Song Books (Cage) =

1970 collection of short works by John Cage

Song Books (Solos for Voice 3–92) is a collection of short works by John Cage, composed and compiled by the composer in 1970. It contains pieces of four kinds: songs, songs with electronics, directions for a theatrical performance, and directions for a theatrical performance with electronics. "Any of these may be performed by one or more singers."

== Structure ==
Song Books was published by in 1970 as three volumes: volume one contained Solos for Voice 3–58, volume two contained Solos for Voice 59–92, and the third volume, titled "Instructions", contains various tables and other materials necessary for performance of some of the pieces. The work explores a very wide variety of notation systems. Some Solos are given in standard notation, others employ a special brand of notation with circles of different sizes and lines instead of notes, still others are systems of dots and lines, etc. Some are not notated at all: the text is given using different fonts and font sizes for different words, or sometimes changing in mid-sentence. Certain Solos consist only of instructions to the performer, ie. what he or she should do and how, although these instructions may be rather free (for instance, "Perform a disciplined action" may be an instruction, and according to Cage it does not mean "Do whatever you want", but rather a request to discipline oneself and/or free oneself of one's likes and dislikes.)

Most of the texts are from Henry David Thoreau's journals (and volume 3 contains a portrait of Thoreau as material for one of the Solos); other authors whose texts Cage used in the work include Norman O. Brown, Erik Satie, Marcel Duchamp, Buckminster Fuller, Merce Cunningham (from his notes on choreography) and Marshall McLuhan. For "Solo for Voice 91", Cage wrote his own text. He also used words of Indo-European roots (reflecting on Cage's specialist knowledge of mushrooms), a glossary of English and foreign geographical terms and names of constellations and Earth population centers.

== Editions ==
- Edition Peters 6806A (Solos 3–58) and 6806B (Solos 59–92), 1970 by Henmar Press

== Recordings ==
The first complete recording of Song Books was released on the Sub Rosa label in September 2012, with Loré Lixenberg and Gregory Rose (vocalists) and Robert Worby (sound design).

== See also ==
- List of compositions by John Cage
- Graphic notation
