= Kremen (surname) =

Kremin is a Slavic-language surname literally meaning "flint". Notable people with this surname include:

- Barbara Kremen (1922–2022), American writer
- Claire Kremen, American conservation biologist
- Gary Kremen (born 1963), American engineer, entrepreneur and public servant
- Ilona Kremen (born 1994), Belarusian tennis player
- Irwin Kremen (1925–2020), American artist
- Pete Kremen, American politician

== See also ==
- Kremen (disambiguation)
- Kremin (disambiguation)
