= 4′33″ =

1952 modernist composition by John Cage

- Modernist composition by John Cage
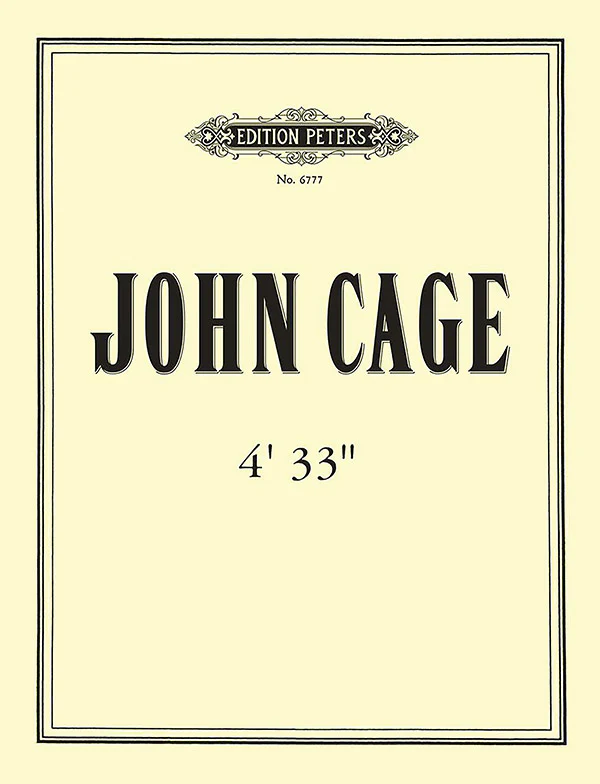
- Original Woodstock manuscript of the composition
- Year: 1952
- Period: Modernist music
- Duration: 4 minutes and 33 seconds
- Movements: Three

Premiere
- Date: August 29, 1952
- Performers: David Tudor

4′33″ (Note: Often pronounced simply as "four thirty-three", but sometimes alternatively as "four minutes, thirty-three seconds" or "four minutes and thirty-three seconds".) is a modernist composition (Note: The labelling of 4′33″ as a "composition" is controversial, as it is intrinsically silence—the very opposite of music, which is often defined as "sounds organized by humans", at the very least. However, Cage maintains that his piece is not silence, but the combination of ambient noises heard by the audience, which can be deemed "music". Therefore, for the sake of consistency, 4′33″ can be considered a "composition".) by American experimental composer John Cage. It was composed in 1952 for any instrument or combination of instruments; the score instructs performers not to play their instruments throughout the three movements. It is divided into three movements, (Note: Cage divided the composition into three distinct movements, but this is often disregarded; the piece is silence, and a movement is defined as "sections of a work [which] may be distinguished in terms of style, key and tempo". While there is no perceived distinguishment between the three sections, Cage insists that there is, as the variation in ambient sounds between each movement is, in itself, a distinction.) lasting 30 seconds, 2 minutes and 23 seconds, and 1 minute and 40 seconds, respectively, (Note: According to a reproduction of the original Woodstock manuscript.) although Cage later stated that the movements' durations can be determined by the musician. As suggested by the title, the composition lasts 4 minutes and 33 seconds. It is marked by silence except for ambient sound, which is intended to contribute to the performance.

4′33″ was conceived around 1947–48, while Cage was working on the piano cycle Sonatas and Interludes. Many prior musical pieces were largely composed of silence, and silence played a notable role in his prior work, including Sonatas and Interludes. His studies on Zen Buddhism during the late 1940s about chance music led him to acknowledge the value of silence in providing an opportunity to reflect on one's surroundings and psyche. Recent developments in contemporary art also bolstered Cage's understanding on silence, which he increasingly began to perceive as impossible after Rauschenberg's White Painting was first displayed.

4′33″ premiered in 1952 and was met with shock and widespread controversy; many musicologists revisited the very definition of music and questioned whether Cage's work qualified as such. Cage intended 4′33″ to be experimental—to test the audience's attitude to silence and prove that any auditory experience may constitute music, seeing that absolute silence (Note: This article distinguishes between "silence" and "absolute silence". "Silence" is defined as the lack of sounds within the composition itself, while "absolute silence" is the complete lack of sounds, both within and outside the composition—so, silence in the hall in which 4′33″ is performed. Cage insists that no absolute silence can exist; the perceived silence of his composition is, in fact, not absolute, since many ambient sounds can be heard while it is performed.) cannot exist. Although 4′33″ is labelled as 4 minutes and 33 seconds of silence, Cage maintains that the ambient noises heard during the performance contribute to the composition. Since this counters the conventional involvement of harmony and melody in music, many musicologists consider 4′33″ to be the birth of noise music, and some have likened it to Dadaist art. 4′33″ also embodies the idea of musical indeterminacy, as the silence is subject to the individual's interpretation; thereby, one is encouraged to explore their surroundings and themselves.

4′33″ greatly influenced modernist music, furthering the genres of noise music and silent music, which—whilst still controversial to this day—reverberate among many contemporary musicians. Cage re-explored the idea of silent composition in two later renditions: 0′00″ (1962) and One^{3} (1989). In a 1982 interview, and on numerous other occasions, he stated that 4′33″ was his most important work. The New Grove Dictionary of Music and Musicians describes 4′33″ as Cage's "most famous and controversial creation". In 2013, Dale Eisinger of Complex ranked the composition eighth in his list of the greatest performance art works.

== Background ==
=== The concept ===
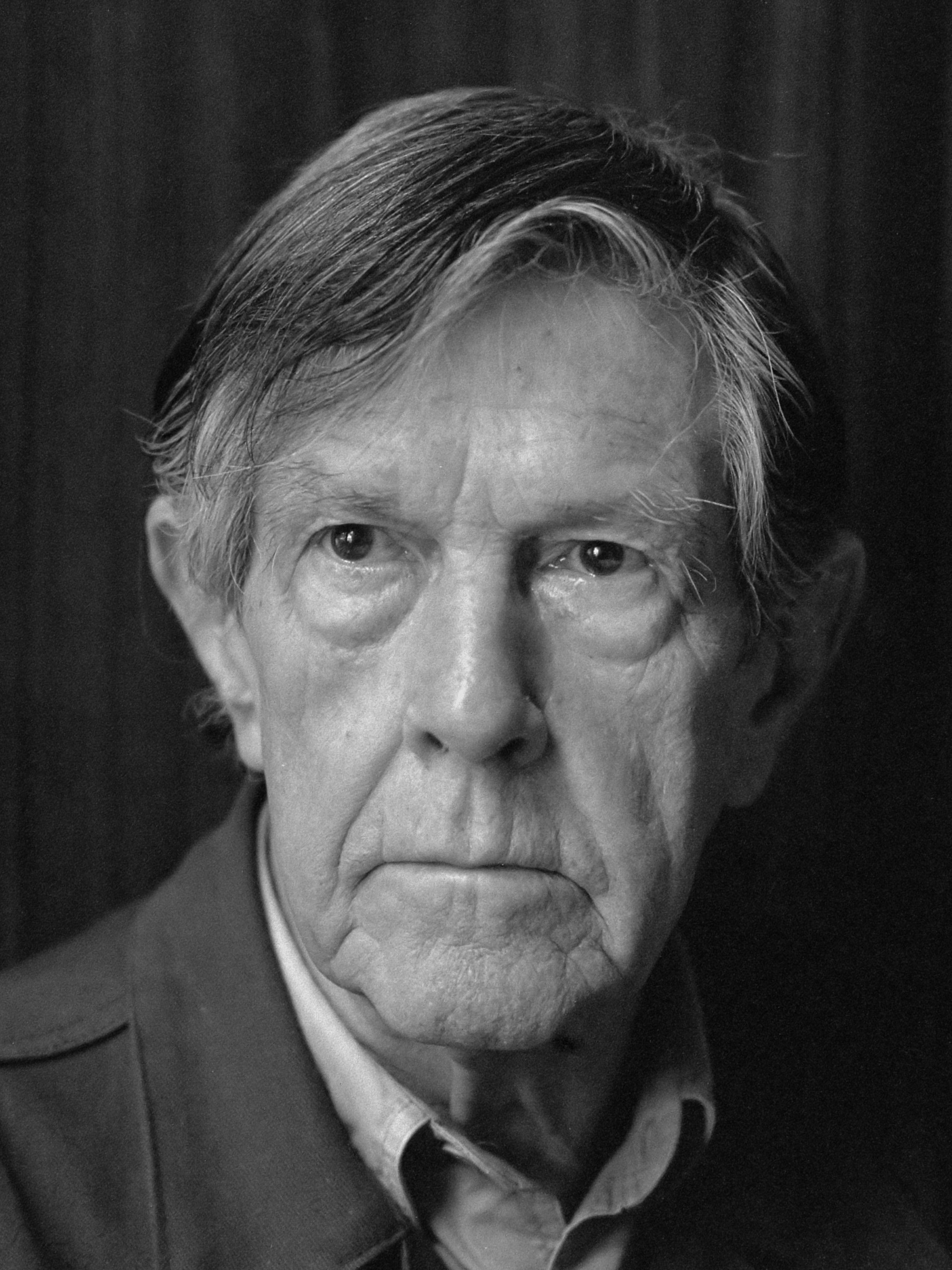
John Cage in 1988

The first time Cage mentioned the idea of a piece composed entirely of silence was during a 1947 (or 1948) lecture at Vassar College, A Composer's Confessions. At this time, he was working on the cycle for piano Sonatas and Interludes. Cage told the audience that he had "several new desires", one of which was:

to compose a piece of uninterrupted silence and sell it to Muzak Co. It will be three or four-and-a-half minutes long—those being the standard lengths of "canned" music and its title will be Silent Prayer. It will open with a single idea which I will attempt to make as seductive as the color and shape and fragrance of a flower. The ending will approach imperceptibility.

Prior to this, silence had played a major role in several of Cage's works composed before 4′33″. The Duet for Two Flutes (1934), composed when Cage was 22, opens with silence, and silence was an important structural element in some of the Sonatas and Interludes (1946–48), Music of Changes (1951) and Two Pastorales (1951). The Concerto for prepared piano and orchestra (1951) closes with an extended silence, and Waiting (1952), a piano piece composed just a few months before 4′33″, consists of long silences framing a single, short ostinato pattern. Furthermore, in his songs The Wonderful Widow of Eighteen Springs (1942) and A Flower (1950) Cage directs the pianist to play a closed instrument, which may be understood as a metaphor of silence.

However, at the time of its conception, Cage felt that a fully silent piece would be incomprehensible, and was reluctant to write it down: "I didn't wish it to appear, even to me, as something easy to do or as a joke. I wanted to mean it utterly and be able to live with it." Painter Alfred Leslie recalls Cage presenting a "one-minute-of-silence talk" in front of a window during the late 1940s, while visiting Studio 35 at New York University.

=== Precursors ===
Although he was a pioneer of silent music, Cage was not the first to compose it. Others, especially in the first half of the twentieth century, had already published related work, which possibly influenced Cage. As early as 1907, Ferruccio Busoni delineated the importance of silence in music:

What comes closest to its original essence in our musical art today are the pause and fermata. Great performance artists and improvisers know how to use this expressive tool to a greater and more extensive extent. The exciting silence between two movements—in this environment, itself, music—is more suggestive than the more definite, but less flexible, sound.

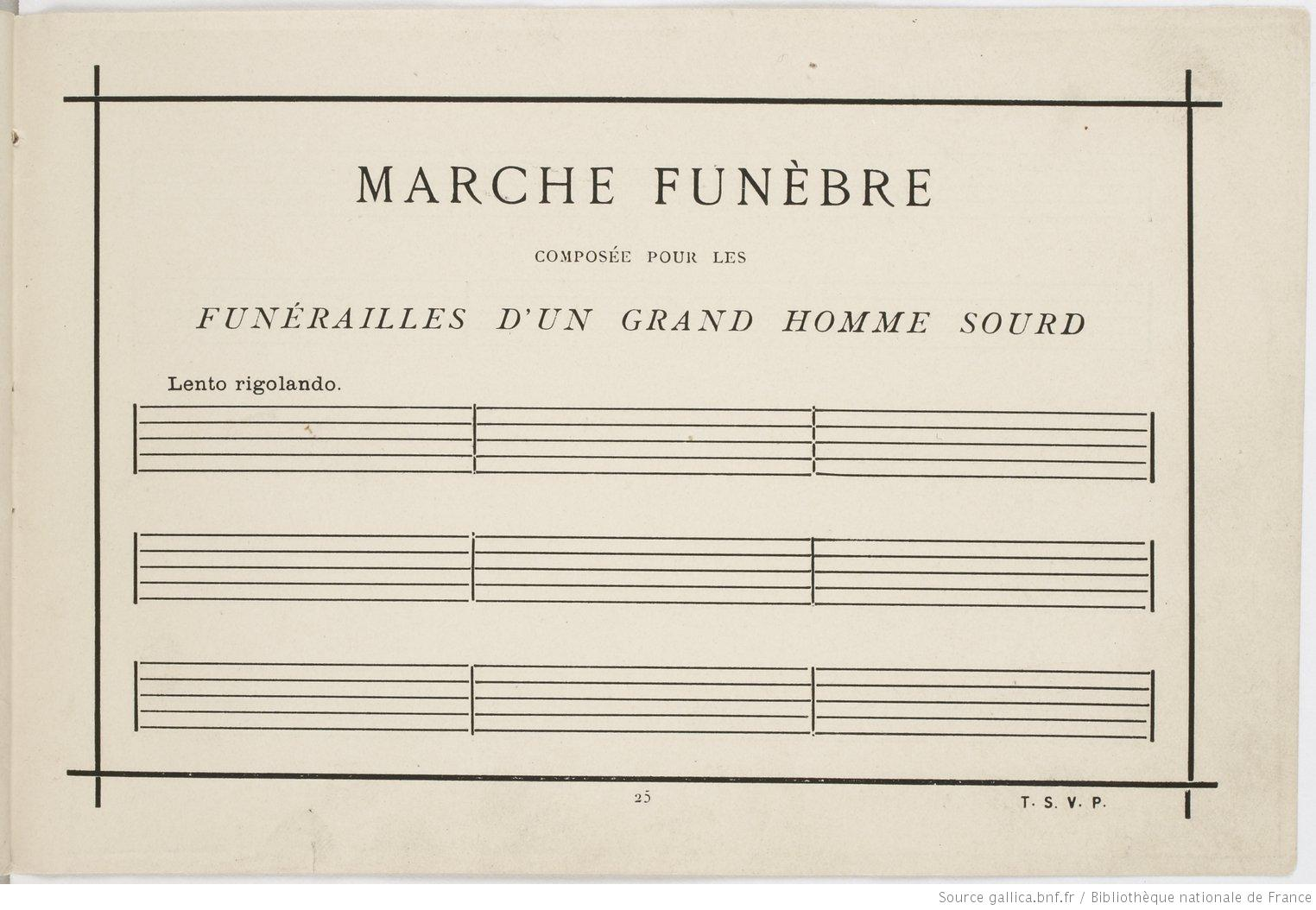
Sheet music for Allais' Funeral March, containing no musical notes

An example is the Funeral March for the Obsequies of a Deaf Man (in French: Marche funèbre composée pour les funérailles d'un grand homme sourd) (1897) by Alphonse Allais, consisting of 24 empty measures. Allais was a companion of his fellow composer Erik Satie, and, since Cage admired the latter, the Funeral March may have motivated him to compose 4′33″, but he later wrote that he was not aware of Allais' work at the time.

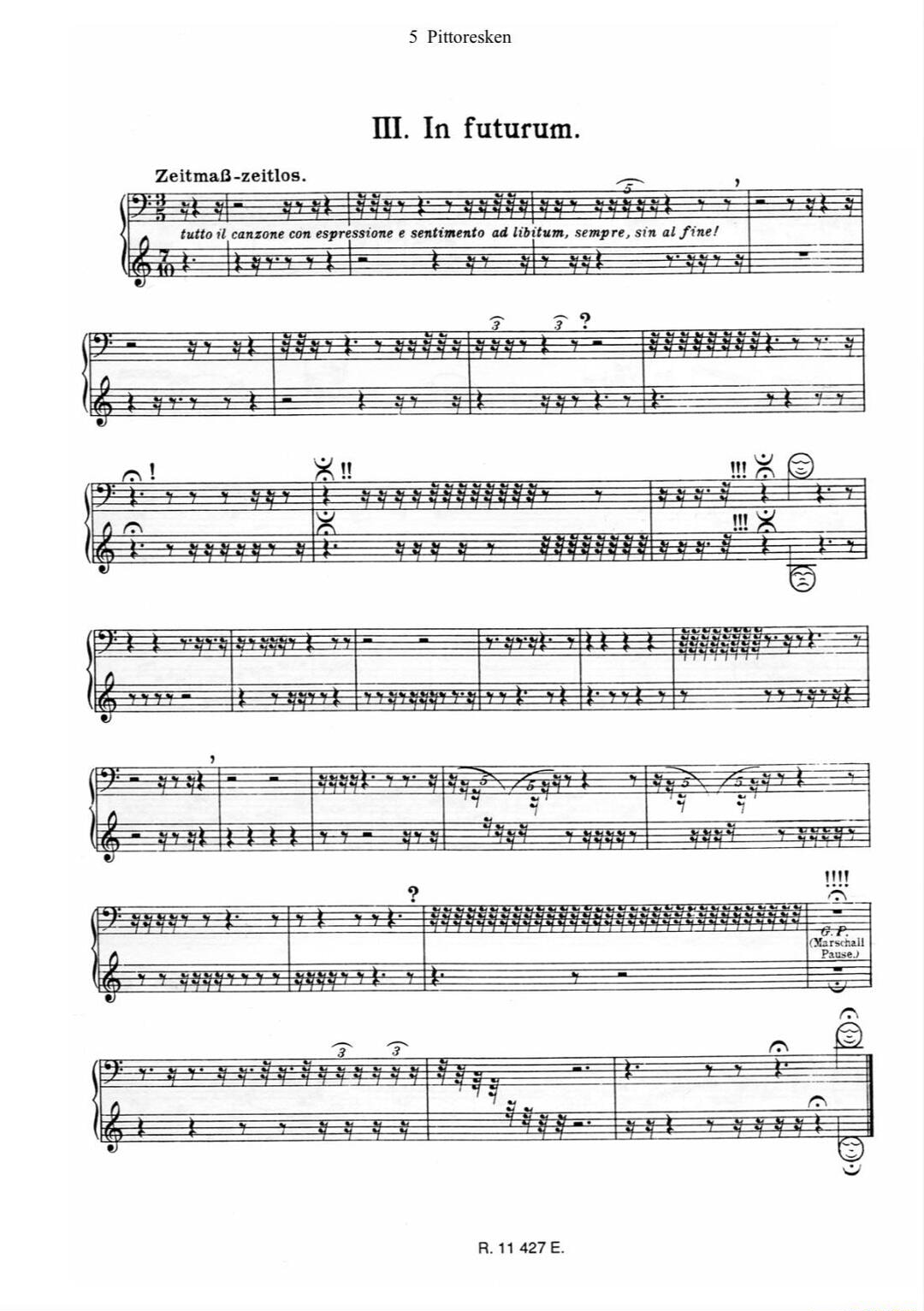
Page of rests, from the score of Erwin Schulhoff's In Futurum

Silent compositions of the twentieth century preceding Cage's include the In futurum movement from the Fünf Pittoresken (1919) by Erwin Schulhoff—solely comprising rests— and Yves Klein's Monotone–Silence Symphony (1949), in which the second and fourth movements are bare twenty minutes of silence.

Similar ideas had been envisioned in literature. For instance, Harold Acton's prose fable Cornelian (1928) mentions a musician conducting "performances consisting largely of silence". In 1947, jazz musician Dave Tough joked that he was writing a play in which "a string quartet is playing the most advanced music ever written. It's made up entirely of rests ... Suddenly, the viola man jumps up in a rage and shakes his bow at the first violin. 'Lout', he screams, 'you played that last measure wrong.'"

=== Direct influences ===
==== Zen Buddhism ====
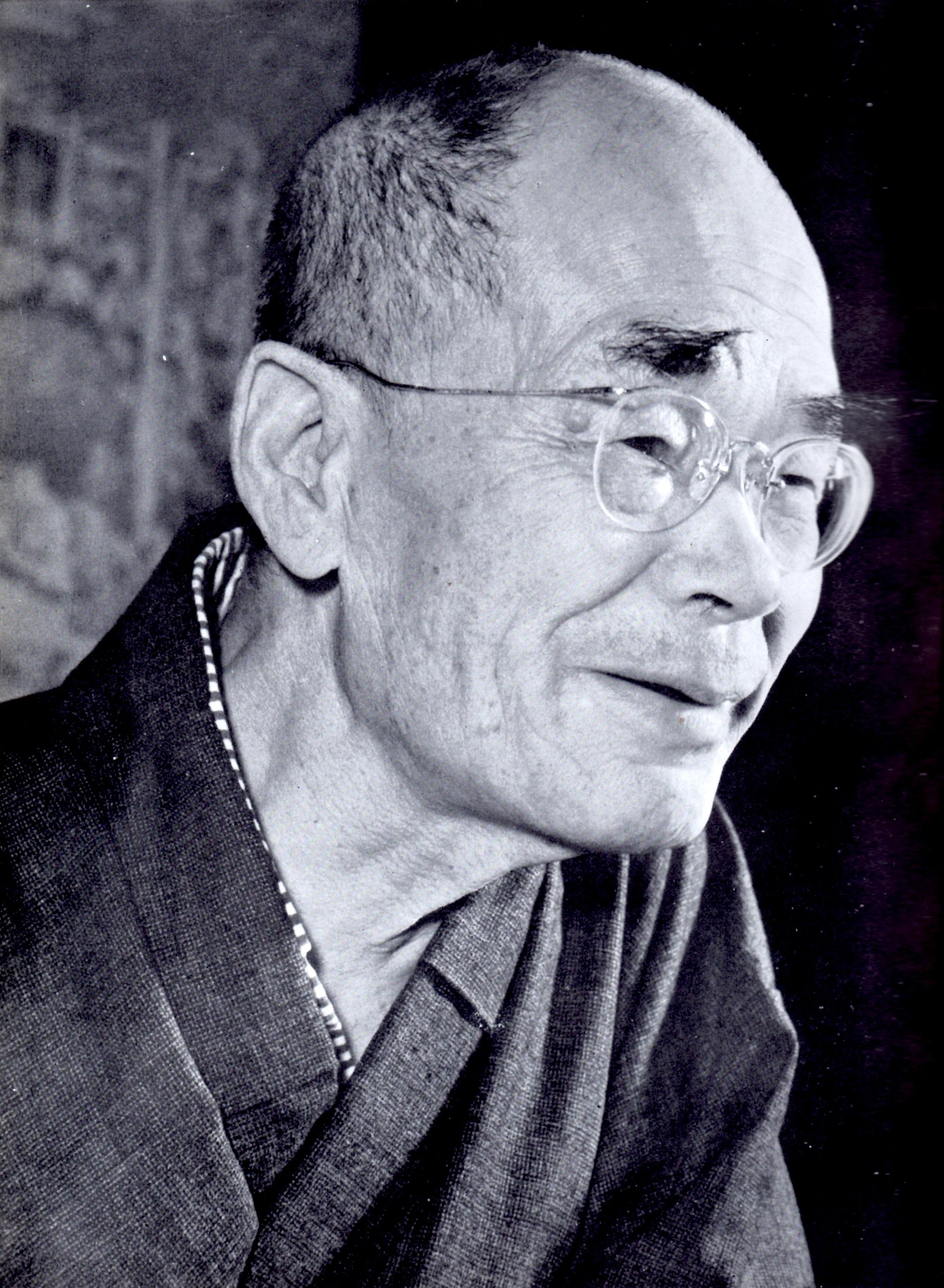
Daisetz Suzuki, whose approach to Zen Buddhism influenced Cage

Since the late 1940s, Cage had been studying Zen Buddhism, especially through Japanese scholar Daisetz Suzuki, who introduced the field to the Western World. Thereon, he connected sounds in silence to the notions of "unimpededness and interpenetration". In a 1951/1952 lecture, he defined unimpededness as "seeing that in all of space each thing and each human being is at the center", and interpenetration as the view "that each one of the [things and humans at the center] is moving out in all directions penetrating and being penetrated by every other one no matter what the time or what the space", concluding that "each and every thing in all of time and space is related to each and every other thing in all of time and space".

Cage believed that sounds existed in a state of unimpededness, as each one is not hindered by the other due to them being isolated by silence, but also that they interpenetrate each other, since they work in tandem with each other and "interact" with the silence. Hence, he thought that music is intrinsically an alternation between sound and silence, especially after his visit to Harvard University's anechoic chamber. He increasingly began to see silence as an integral part of music since it allows for sounds to exist in the first place—to interpenetrate each other. The prevalence of silence in a composition also allowed the opportunity for contemplation on one's psyche and surroundings, reflecting the Zen emphasis on meditation music as means to soothe the mind. As he began to realize the impossibility of absolute silence, Cage affirmed the psychological significance of 'lack of sound' in a musical composition:

I've thought of music as a means of changing the mind ... In being themselves, [sounds] open the minds of people who made them or listened to them to other possibilities than they had previously considered.

In 1951, Cage composed the Concerto for Prepared Piano and Chamber Orchestra, which can be seen as a representation of the concept of interpenetration.

==== Chance music ====
Cage also explored the concept of chance music—a composition without melodic structure or regular notation. The aforementioned Concerto for Prepared Piano employs the concepts posited in the Ancient Chinese text I Ching.

==== Visit to the anechoic chamber ====
In 1951, Cage visited the anechoic chamber at Harvard University. Cage entered the chamber expecting to hear silence, but he later wrote: "I heard two sounds, one high and one low. When I described them to the engineer in charge, he informed me that the high one was my nervous system in operation, the low one my blood in circulation". Cage had gone to a place where he expected total silence, and yet heard sound. "Until I die there will be sounds. And they will continue following my death. One need not fear about the future of music". The realization as he saw it of the impossibility of silence led to the composition of 4′33″.

==== White Painting ====
Another cited influence for this piece came from the field of the visual arts. Cage's friend and sometimes colleague Robert Rauschenberg had produced, in 1951, a series of white paintings (collectively named White Painting), seemingly "blank" canvases (though painted with white house paint) that in fact change according to varying light conditions in the rooms in which they were hung, the shadows of people in the room and so on. This inspired Cage to use a similar idea, as he later stated, "Actually what pushed me into it was not guts but the example of Robert Rauschenberg. His white paintings ... when I saw those, I said, 'Oh yes, I must. Otherwise I'm lagging, otherwise music is lagging.'" In an introduction to an article "On Robert Rauschenberg, Artist, and His Works", John Cage writes: "To Whom It May Concern: The white paintings came first; my silent piece came later."

== The composition ==
=== Premiere and initial reception ===
They missed the point. There's no such thing as silence. What they thought was silence, because they didn't know how to listen, was full of accidental sounds. You could hear the wind stirring outside during the first movement. During the second, raindrops began pattering the roof, and during the third the people themselves made all kinds of interesting sounds as they talked or walked out.

— John Cage, on the premiere of 4′33″

The premiere of the three-movement 4′33″ was given by David Tudor on August 29, 1952, in Maverick Concert Hall, Woodstock, New York, as part of a recital of contemporary piano music. The audience saw him sit at the piano and, to mark the beginning of the piece, close the keyboard lid. Some time later he opened it briefly, to mark the end of the first movement. This process was repeated for the second and third movements. (Note: The actions of Tudor in the first performance are often misdescribed so that the lid is explained as being open during the movements. Cage's handwritten score (produced after the first performance) states that the lid was closed during the movements, and opened to mark the spaces between.) Although the audience was enthusiastic about contemporary art, the premiere was met with widespread controversy and scandal, such that Calvin Tomkins notes: "The Woodstock audience considered the piece either a joke or an affront, and this has been the general reaction of most people who have heard it, or heard of it, ever since. Some listeners have been unaware they were hearing it at all".

=== General reception ===
A recording of 4'33 by composer John Cage

Music critic Kyle Gann called the piece "one of the most misunderstood pieces of music ever written and yet, at times, one of the avant-garde's best understood as well". He dismissed the idea that 4′33″ was a joke or a hoax, wrote that the theory of Dada and theater have some justification, and said that for him the composition is a "thought experiment". He concluded that the idea that 4′33″ is a "Zen practice" "may be the most directly fertile suggestion".

== Analysis ==
The composition is an indispensable contribution to the Modernist movement and formalized noise music as a genre. Noise music is seen as the anathema to the traditional view of harmony in music, exploiting random sound patterns 'noise' in the process of making music—the "detritus of the music process". Paul Hegarty notes that: "The silence of the pianist in 4′33″ can be understood as the traditional silence of the audience so that it can appreciate the music being played. Music itself is sacrificed, sacrificed to the musicality of the world". For Hegarty, 4′33″, is made up of incidental sounds that represent perfectly the tension between "desirable" sound (properly played musical notes) and undesirable "noise" that make up all noise music. It is made of three movements.

=== Intentions ===
4′33″ challenges, or rather exploits to a radical extent, the social regiments of the modern concert life etiquette, experimenting on unsuspecting concert-goers to prove an important point. First, the choice of a prestigious venue and the social status of the composer and the performers automatically heightens audience's expectations for the piece. As a result, the listener is more focused, giving Cage's 4′33″ the same amount of attention (or perhaps even more) as if it were Beethoven's Ninth Symphony. Thus, even before the performance, the reception of the work is already predetermined by the social setup of the concert. Furthermore, the audience's behavior is limited by the rules and regulation of the concert hall; they will quietly sit and listen to 4′33″ of ambient noise. It is not easy to get a large group of people to listen to ambient noise for nearly five minutes, unless they are regulated by the concert hall etiquette.

The second point made by 4′33″ concerns duration. According to Cage, duration is the essential building block of all of music. This distinction is motivated by the fact that duration is the only element shared by both silence and sound. As a result, the underlying structure of any musical piece consists of an organized sequence of "time buckets". They could be filled with either sounds, silence or noise; where neither of these elements is absolutely necessary for completeness. In the spirit of his teacher Schoenberg, Cage managed to emancipate the silence and the noise to make it an acceptable or, perhaps, even an integral part of his music composition. 4′33″ serves as a radical and extreme illustration of this concept, asking that if the time buckets are the only necessary parts of the musical composition, then what stops the composer from filling them with no intentional sounds?

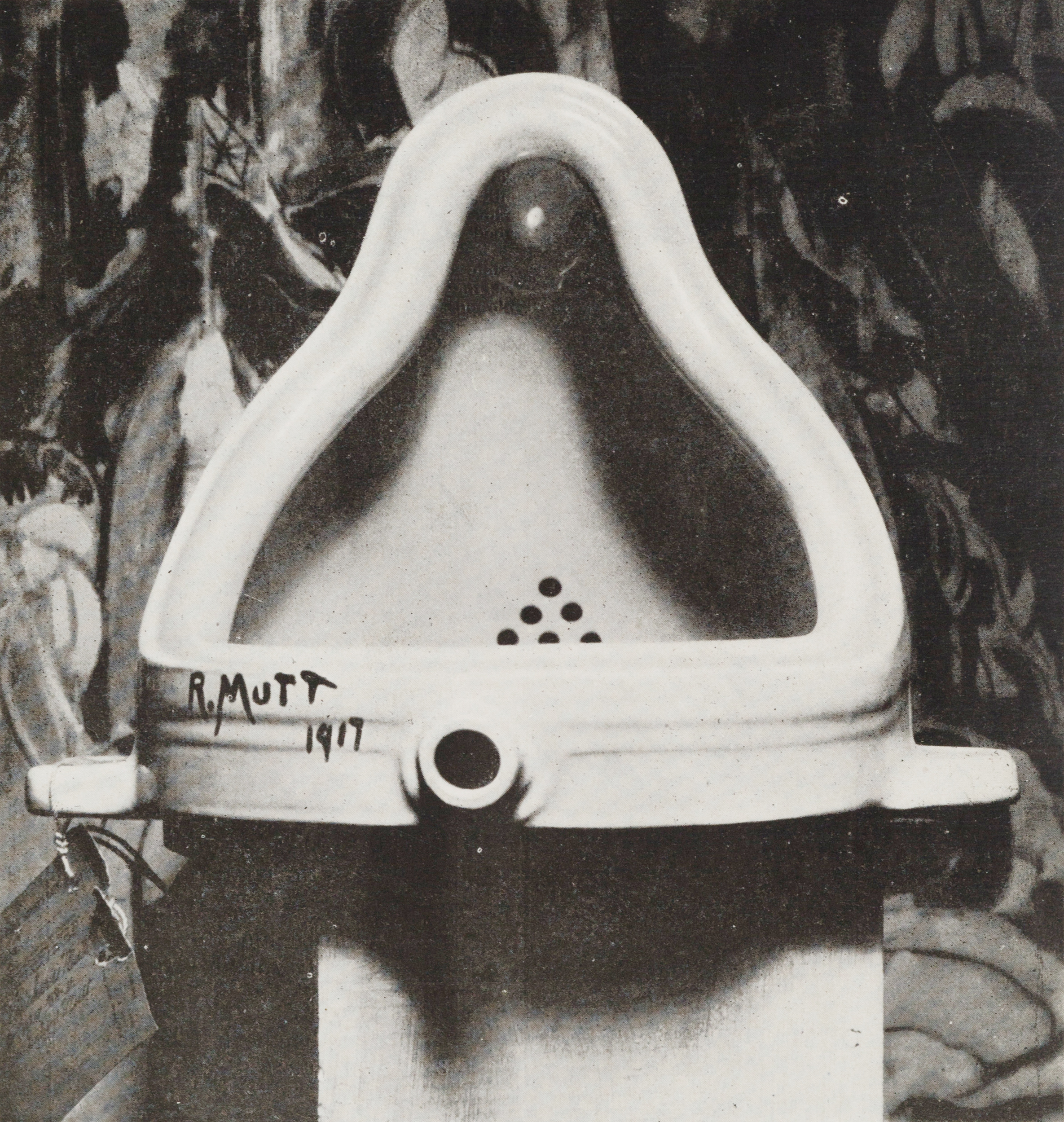
Marcel Duchamp's Fountain (1917): a hallmark of the Dadaist movement, with which Cage's composition is associated

The third point is that the work of music is defined not only by its content but also by the behavior it elicits from the audience. In the case of Igor Stravinsky's Rite of Spring, this would consist of widespread dissatisfaction leading up to violent riots. In Cage's 4′33″, the audience felt cheated by having to listen to no composed sounds from the performer. Nevertheless, in 4′33″ the audience contributed the bulk of the musical material of the piece. Since the piece consists of exclusively ambient noise, the audience's behavior, their whispers and movements, are essential elements that fill the above-mentioned time buckets.

Above all, 4′33″—in fact, more of an experiment than a composition—is intended to question the very notion of music. Cage believed that "silence is a real note" and "will henceforth designate all the sounds not wanted by the composer". He had the ambition to go beyond what is achievable on a piece of paper by leaving the musical process to chance, inviting the audience to closely monitor the ambient noises characterizing the piece. French musicologist Daniel Charles proposes a related theory; 4′33″ is—resulting from the composer's lack of interference in the piece—a 'happening', since, during the performance, the musician is more of an actor than a 'musician', per se. He also notes that it resembles a Duchamp-style found object, due to the fact that it creates art from objects that do not serve an artistic function, as silence is often associated with the opposite of music. In fact, Cage's composition draws parallels to the Dadaist movement due to the involvement of 'anti-art' objects into art (music), its apparent nonsensical nature, and blatant defiance of the status quo.

=== Silence ===
The perceived silence characterizing Cage's composition is not actually 'silence', but the interference of the ambient sounds made by the audience and environment. To him, any auditory experience containing some degree of sound, and hence can be considered music, countering its frequent label as "four minutes thirty-three seconds of silence".

=== Psychological impact ===
The Lacanian approach implies a profound psychological connection to 4′33″, as the individual is invited to ponder their surroundings and psyche. In a 2013 TED talk, psychologist Paul Bloom put forward 4′33″ as one example to show that knowing about the origin of something influences how one formulates an opinion on it. In this case, one can deem the five minutes of silence in Cage's composition as different than five minutes of ordinary silence, as in a library, as they know where this silence originates; hence, they can feel motivated to pay to listen to 4′33″, even though it is inherently no different than five minutes of ordinary silence.

=== Surrealist automatism ===
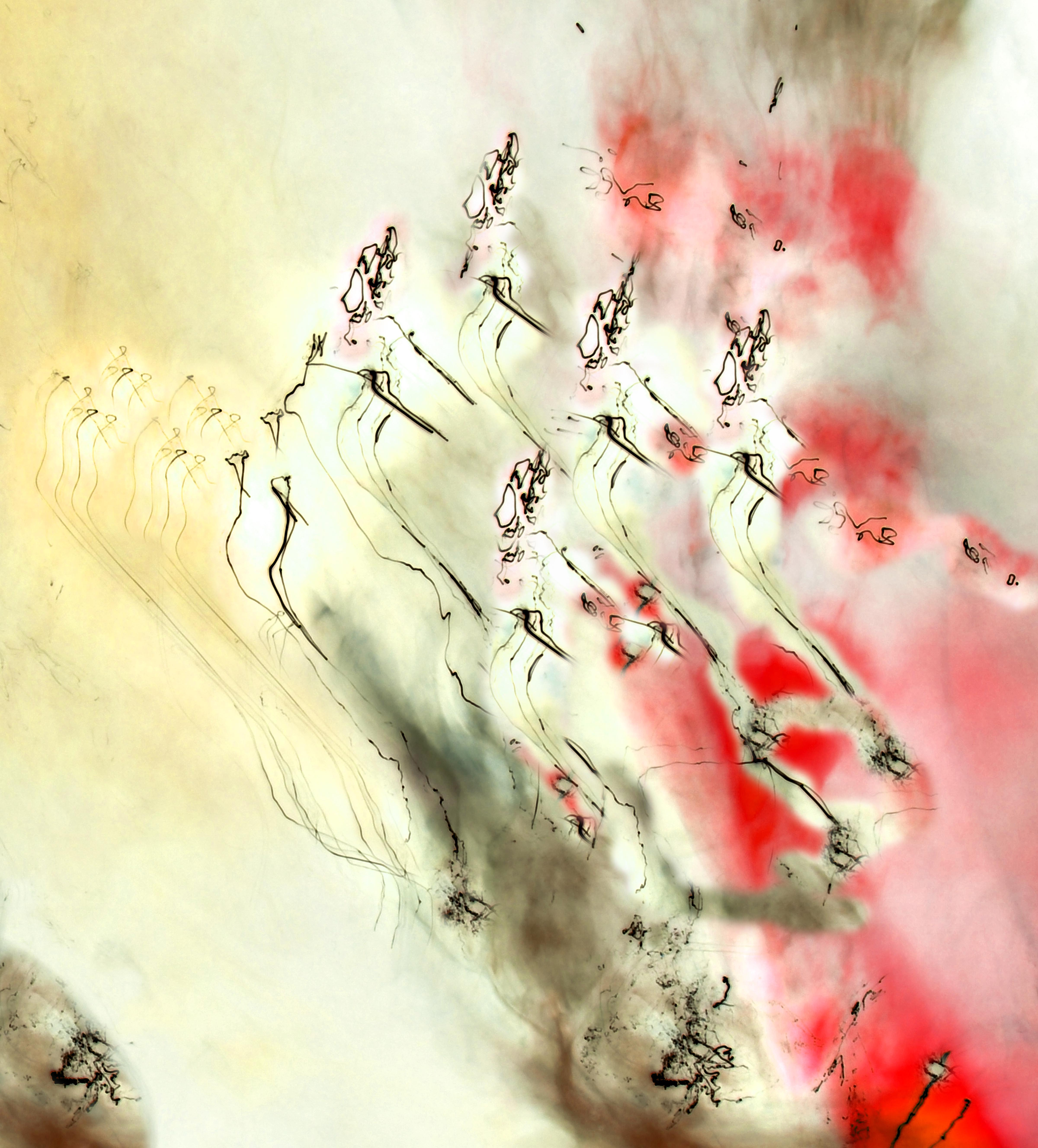
An example of an automatic painting

Some musicologists have argued that 4′33″ is an example of surrealist automatism. Since the Romantic Era composers have been striving to produce music that could be separated from any social connections, transcending the boundaries of time and space. In automatism, composers and artists strive to eliminate their role in the creation of work, motivated by the belief that self-expression always includes the infiltration of the social standards—that the individual (including the musician) is subjected to from birth—in artistic truth (the message the musician wishes to convey).

Therefore, the only method by which the listener can realize artistic truth involves the separation of the musician from their work. In 4′33″, the composer has no impact in his work, as Cage cannot control the ambient sounds detected by the audience. Hence, the composition is automatic since the musician has no involvement in how the listener interprets it.

=== Indeterminacy ===
A pioneer of musical indeterminacy, Cage defined it as "the ability of a piece to be performed in substantially different ways".

== Versions ==
=== Of the score ===
Several versions of the score exist; the four below are the main samples that could be identified. Their shared quality is the composition's duration of 4 minutes and 33 seconds—reflected in the title 4′33″— but there is some discrepancy between the lengths of individual movements, specified in different versions of the score. (Note: The Woodstock printed program specifies the lengths 30″, 2′23″ and 1′40″, as does the Kremen manuscript, but the latter versions have a distinguished tempo. In the First Tacet Edition, Cage writes that at the premiere the timings were 33″, 2′40″ and 1′20″, and in the Second Tacet Edition, he adds that after the premiere, a copy had been made for Irwin Kremen, in which the lengths of the movements were 30″, 2′23″ and 1′40″. Some later performances would not abide by this duration, as seen in Frank Zappa's 1993 recording on the 1993 double-CD A Chance Operation: The John Cage Tribute, amounting to five minutes and fifty-three seconds.) (Note: While Cage specifies three movements incorporated in the piece, some later performances included a different number of movements. An example is the recording by the Hungarian Amadinda Percussion Group, consisting of a recording of ambient outdoor bird song in one movement; Frank Zappa's recording also includes wildly different time bands: '35", 1'05", 2'21", 1'02", and 50"', but the number of movements cannot be identified.) The causes of this discrepancy are not currently understood.

==== Woodstock manuscript and reproduction ====
The original Woodstock manuscript (August 1952) is written in conventional notation and dedicated to David Tudor – the first to perform the piece. It is currently lost, but Tudor did attempt to recreate the original score, reproduced in William Fetterman's book John Cage's Theatre Pieces: Notations and Performances. The reproduction notes that 4′33″ can be performed for any instrument or combination of instruments. Regarding tempo, it includes a treble clef staff with a 4/4 time signature, and the beginning of each sentence is identified with Roman numerals and a scale indication: '60 = 1/2-inch'. At the end of each sentence, there is information about each movement's duration in minutes and seconds; these are: 'I = 30 seconds', 'II = 2 minutes 23 seconds' and 'III = 1 minute 40 seconds'. Tudor commented: "It's important that you read the score as you're performing it, so there are these pages you use. So you wait, and then turn the page. I know it sounds very straight, but in the end it makes a difference".

==== Kremen manuscript ====
The Kremen manuscript (1953) is written in graphic, space-time notation—which Cage dubbed "proportional notation"—and dedicated to the American artist Irwin Kremen. The movements of the piece are rendered as space between long vertical lines; a tempo indication is provided (60), and at the end of each movement the time is indicated in minutes and seconds. In page 4, the note '1 PAGE = 7 INCHES = 56″' is included. The same instructions, timing and indications to the reproduced Woodstock manuscript are implemented.

==== First Tacet Edition ====
The so-called First Tacet Edition (or Typed Tacet Edition) (1960) is a typewritten score, originally printed in Edition Peters as EP No. 6777. It lists the three movements using Roman numbers, with the word "tacet" underneath each. A note by Cage describes the first performance and mentions that "the work may be performed by any instrumentalist or combination of instrumentalists and last any length of time". In doing so, Cage not only regulates the reading of the score, but also determines the identity of the composition. Conversely to the initial two manuscripts, Cage notes that the premiere organized the movements into the following durations: 33", 2'40" and 1'20", and adds that their length "must be found by chance" performance. The First Tacet Edition is described in Michael Nyman's book Experimental Music: Cage and Beyond, but is not reproduced.

==== Second Tacet Edition ====
The so-called Second Tacet Edition (or Calligraphic Tacet Edition) (1986) is the same as the First, except that it is printed in Cage's calligraphy, and the explanatory note mentions the Kremen manuscript. It is also classified as EP No. 6777 (i.e., it carries the same catalog number as the first Tacet Edition). Additionally, a facsimile, reduced in size, of the Kremen manuscript, appeared in July 1967 in Source 1, no. 2:46–54.

=== Of the composition itself ===
==== 4′33″ No. 2 ====
In 1962, Cage wrote 0′00″, which is also referred to as 4′33″ No. 2. The directions originally consisted of one sentence: "In a situation provided with maximum amplification, perform a disciplined action". At the first performance Cage had to write that sentence. The second performance added four new qualifications to the directions: "the performer should allow any interruptions of the action, the action should fulfill an obligation to others, the same action should not be used in more than one performance, and should not be the performance of a musical composition".

==== One^{3} ====
In late 1989, three years before his death, Cage revisited the idea of 4′33″ one last time. He composed One^{3}, the full title of which is One^{3} = 4′33″ (0′00″) + 𝄞. As in all of the Number Pieces, 'One' refers to the number of performers required. The score instructs the performer to build a sound system in the concert hall, so that "the whole hall is on the edge of feedback, without actually feeding back". The content of the piece is the electronically amplified sound of the hall and the audience.

== Plagiarism ==
In July 2002, John Cage's heirs sued British singer-songwriter Mike Batt for plagiarism over his piece "A One Minute Silence", which was literally a minute of silence. Batt had included the track on the February 2002 album of his crossover ensemble The Planets, crediting it to 'Batt/Cage'— supposedly to honor the composer. The Mechanical Copyright Protection Society then sued Batt for plagiarizing Cage's silent composition 4′33″.

Initially, Batt said he would defend himself against the accusations and stated that "A One Minute Silence" was "a much better silent piece". He said he was "able to say in one minute what Cage could only say in four minutes and 33 seconds". Batt eventually reached an out-of-court settlement with the composer's heirs in September 2002 and paid what was described at the time as a "six-figure sum" in compensation. However, in December 2010, Batt admitted that the alleged legal dispute had been a publicity stunt and that he had actually only made a donation of £1,000 to the John Cage Foundation.

== Christmas number one campaign ==
In the week leading up to Christmas 2010, a Facebook page was created to encourage residents of the United Kingdom to buy a new rendition of 4′33″, in the hope that it would prevent the winner of the seventh series of The X Factor, Matt Cardle, from topping the UK Singles Chart and becoming the Christmas number one. The page was inspired by a similar campaign the year prior, in which a Facebook page set up by English radio DJ Jon Morter and his then-wife Tracey, prompting people to buy Rage Against the Machine's "Killing in the Name" in the week before Christmas 2009 to make it the Christmas number one. Hence, the 4′33″ campaign was dubbed 'Cage Against the Machine'. The creators of the Facebook page hoped that reaching number one would promote Cage's composition and "make December 25 'a silent night'."

The campaign received support from several celebrities. It first came into prominence after science writer Ben Goldacre mentioned it on his Twitter profile. Despite many similar campaigns occurring that year, The Guardian journalist Tom Ewing considered 'Cage Against the Machine' "the only effort this year with a hope of [reaching number one]". XFM DJ Eddy Temple-Morris and The Guardian journalist Luke Bainbridge also voiced their support. Ultimately, the rendition of 4′33″ failed to reach number one, only peaking at number 21 on the charts; the winning song of X Factor instead became Christmas number one of 2010.

== Notable performances and recordings ==
A filmed performance of 4′33″ in 14th Street–Union Square station, 2013

- Several performances of 4′33″ including a 'techno remix' of the New Waver project were broadcast on Australian radio station ABC Classic FM, as part of a program exploring "sonic responses" to Cage's work. Another of these 'responses' was the rendition named 'You Can Make Your Own Music', recorded by the Swedish electronic band Covenant as part of their 2000 album United States of Mind.
- On January 16, 2004, at the Barbican Centre in London, the BBC Symphony Orchestra gave the United Kingdom's first orchestral performance of this work, conducted by Lawrence Foster. The performance was broadcast live on BBC Radio 3, and the station faced a unique problem; its emergency system—automatically switching on and playing separate music in a period of perceived silence 'dead air'—interrupted the broadcast, and had to be switched off. On the same day, a tongue-in-cheek version was recorded by the staff of The Guardian.
- On December 5, 2010, an international simultaneous performance of 4′33″ took place among 200 performers, amateur and professional musicians, and artists. The global orchestra, conducted live by Bob Dickinson, via video link, performed the piece in support of the 'Cage Against The Machine' campaign to bring 4′33″ to 2010 Christmas Number 1 in the UK Singles Chart.
- In April 2024, John McWhorter refused to play 4′33″ to his class at Columbia University due to chants coming from student protestors outside during the 2024 pro-Palestinian protests on university campuses. The decision gained media attention for misunderstanding the intent of the piece.
- In 2025, Jess Damuck and Ben Sinclair performed 4′33″ on two Suzuki Omnichords in Los Angeles at the celebration of life services for the late filmmaker Jeff Baena.
- In October 2026, Swedish busker William Sundman Sääf performed 4′33″ as a protest in the Stockholm subway, after security guards prohibited him from singing and playing audible songs.

== See also ==
- Monotone-Silence Symphony, a composition by Yves Klein featuring both sound and extended silence
- Is This What We Want?, an album by various artists, consisting of ambient noise recorded in recording studios, protesting the use of unlicensed copyrighted work to train artificial intelligence

== Bibliography ==
- Allais, Alphonse (1897), Album primo–avrilesque, Paris, France: P. Ollendorff
- Arnold, Allison E.; Kramer, Jonathan C. (2023). What in the World is Music? (2nd ed.). United States: Routledge. ISBN 9781032341491.
- Bek, Joseph (2001). "Erwin Schulhoff". In Sadie, Stanley; Tyrrell, John (eds.). The New Grove Dictionary of Music and Musicians (2nd ed.). London: Macmillan. ISBN 978-1-56159-239-5.
- Bernstein, David W.; Hatch, Christopher (2001). Writings through John Cage's Music, Poetry, and Art. Chicago, Illinois: University of Chicago Press. ISBN 0-226-04408-4.
- Bormann, Hans-Friedrich (2005). Verschwiegene Stille: John Cages performative Ästhetik [Secretive Silence: John Cage's Performative Aesthetics] (in German). Paderborn, Germany: Fink Wilhelm GmbH + Co.KG. ISBN 978-3-7705-4147-8.
- Burgan, Michael (2003). Buddhist Faith in America. New York City: Facts on File, Inc. ISBN 0-8160-4988-2.
- Busoni, Ferruccio (1916). Entwurf einer neuen Ästhetik der Tonkunst [Sketch of a New Aesthetic of Music] (in German). Leipzig, Germany: Insel-Verlag.
- Cage, John (1961). Silence: Lectures and Writings. Middletown, Connecticut: Wesleyan University Press.
- Carpenter, Humphrey (2009). The Brideshead Generation: Evelyn Waugh and His Friends. United States: Faber and Faber. ISBN 978-0571248339.
- Craenen, Paul (2014). Composing under the Skin: The Music-making Body at the Composer's Desk. Leuven, Belgium: Leuven University Press. ISBN 978-9058679741.
- Charles, Daniel (1978). Gloses sur John Cage (in French). Paris, France: Union générale d'éditions. ISBN 2264008555.
- Dickinson, Peter (1991). "Reviews of Three Books on Satie". The Musical Quarterly. 75 (3): 404–409. doi:10.1093/mq/75.3.404.
- Fetterman, William (1996). John Cage's Theatre Pieces: Notations and Performances. Amsterdam, the Netherlands: Harwood Academic Publishers. ISBN 3-7186-5642-6.
- Fiero, Gloria Konig (1995). The Humanistic Tradition, Book 6: The Global Village of the Twentieth Century (2nd ed.). Brown & Benchmark Pub. ISBN 0-6972-4222-6.
- Gann, Kyle (2010). No Such Thing as Silence: John Cage's 4′33. New Haven, Connecticut: Yale University Press. ISBN 978-0-300-13699-9.
- Harding, James Martin (2013). The Ghosts of the Avant-Garde(s): Exercising Experimental Theater and Performance. Ann Arbor, Michigan: University of Michigan Press. ISBN 978-0-4720-3610-3.
- Harris, Jonathan (2005). Art, Money, Parties: New Institutions in the Political Economy of Contemporary Art. Liverpool, United Kingdom: Liverpool University Press. ISBN 978-0853237198.
- Hegarty, Paul (2007). Noise/Music: A History. New York City: Continuum International Publishing Group. ISBN 978-0826417275.
- Skinner, David; Gillis, Anna Maria; Lifson, Amy (November–December 2012). "Humanities Volume 33, Issue 6". Humanities. Washington D.C., United States: National Endowment for the Humanities.
- Kostelanetz, Richard (2003). Conversing with John Cage. New York City: Routledge. ISBN 0-415-93792-2.
- Kouvaras, Linda Ioanna (2013). Loading the Silence: Australian Sound Art in the Post-Digital Age. Melbourne: Ashgate Publishing. ISBN 9781315592831.
- Lienhard, John H. (2003). Inventing Modern: Growing Up with X-Rays, Skyscrapers, and Tailfins. New York City: Oxford University Press. ISBN 0-19-516032-0.
- Liu, Gerard C. (2017). Music and the Generosity of God. Princeton, New Jersey: Palgrave Macmillan. ISBN 978-3-319-69492-4.
- Nicholls, David (2002). The Cambridge Companion to John Cage. Cambridge, United Kingdom: Cambridge University Press. ISBN 978-0521789684.
- Nyman, Michael (1974). Experimental Music: Cage and Beyond. London, England: Studio Vista. ISBN 0-289-70182-1.
- Pluth, Ed; Zeiher, Cindy (2019). On Silence: Holding the Voice Hostage. Palgrave Pivot. ISBN 978-3030281465.
- Priest, Gail (2008). Experimental Music: Audio Explorations in Australia. Sydney: University of New South Wales Press. ISBN 978-1921410079.
- Pritchett, James (1993). The Music of John Cage. Cambridge, United Kingdom and New York City: Cambridge University Press. ISBN 0-521-56544-8.
- Pritchett, James; Kuhn, Laura & Garrett, Charles Hiroshi (2012). "John Cage". Grove Music Online (8th ed.). Oxford University Press. doi:10.1093/gmo/9781561592630.article.A2223954. ISBN 978-1-56159-263-0. (subscription, Wikilibrary access, or UK public library membership required)
- Reed, S. Alexander (2013). Assimilate: A Critical History of Industrial Music. New York City: Oxford University Press. ISBN 9780199832606.
- Revill, David (1993). The Roaring Silence: John Cage – A Life. New York City: Arcade Publishing. ISBN 978-1-55970-220-1.
- Solomon, Larry J. (2002) [1998]. The Sounds of Silence: John Cage and 4′33 (revised ed.). Archived from the original on January 9, 2018.
- Symonds, Dominica; Karantonis, Pamela (2013). The Legacy of Opera: Reading Music Theatre as Experience and Performance. The Netherlands: Brill Academic Pub. ISBN 978-9042036918.
- Taruskin, Richard (2009). Oxford History of Western Music: Volume 5. New York City: Oxford University Press. ISBN 978-0-19-538630-1.
- Thomsett, Michael C. (2012). Musical Terms, Symbols and Theory: An Illustrated Dictionary. Jefferson, North Carolina: McFarland & Company, Inc. ISBN 978-0-7864-6757-0.
