= Kremen =

Kremen may refer to:

== Places ==
- Kremmen, a town in Oberhavel, Germany
- Kremen, Blagoevgrad Province, a town of Bansko, Blagoevgrad Province, Bulgaria
- Kremen, Kardzhali Province, a village of Kirkovo, Kardzhali Province, Bulgaria
- Kremen, Krško, a settlement in Krško, Slovenia
- Donji Kremen (Lower Kremen), a village in Croatia
- Gornji Kremen (Upper Kremen), a village in Croatia
- Kremen (mountain in Croatia), a mountain in Lika, south of Lička Plješivica
- Kremen (mountain in Serbia), a mountain near Štulac (Lebane)

== Other ==
- Kremen (surname)
- KREMEN1, a human gene
  - Kremen protein 1, the protein encoded by the KREMEN1 gene

== See also ==
- Kremin (disambiguation)
