= Svinjarička Čuka =

Svinjarička Čuka is an archaeological site in southern Serbia, near the village of Štulac in the municipality of Lebane. Cultural deposits at the site date to the Neolithic, Copper, Bronze, and Early Iron Ages. Discovered in 2017, it has been excavated since 2018 to investigate the initial spread of the Neolithic along the Vardar–Morava river corridor. The Neolithic occupation phases at the site date to c. 6100–5500 BC, corresponding to the Early Neolithic, or Starčevo horizon.

== Importance ==
Svinjarička Čuka plays an important role in understanding the Neolithisation of southeast Europe and the spread of Neolithic lifeways from the Fertile Crescent and Anatolia towards Central Europe. Research at the site addresses key questions concerning the spread of farming, the emergence of sedentary life, social networks, resource management, and technological and cultural innovation. The site has been investigated through an interdisciplinary approach combining radiocarbon modelling, ancient DNA analysis, micromorphology, archaeobotany, archaeozoology, isotopic studies, and lithic analysis.

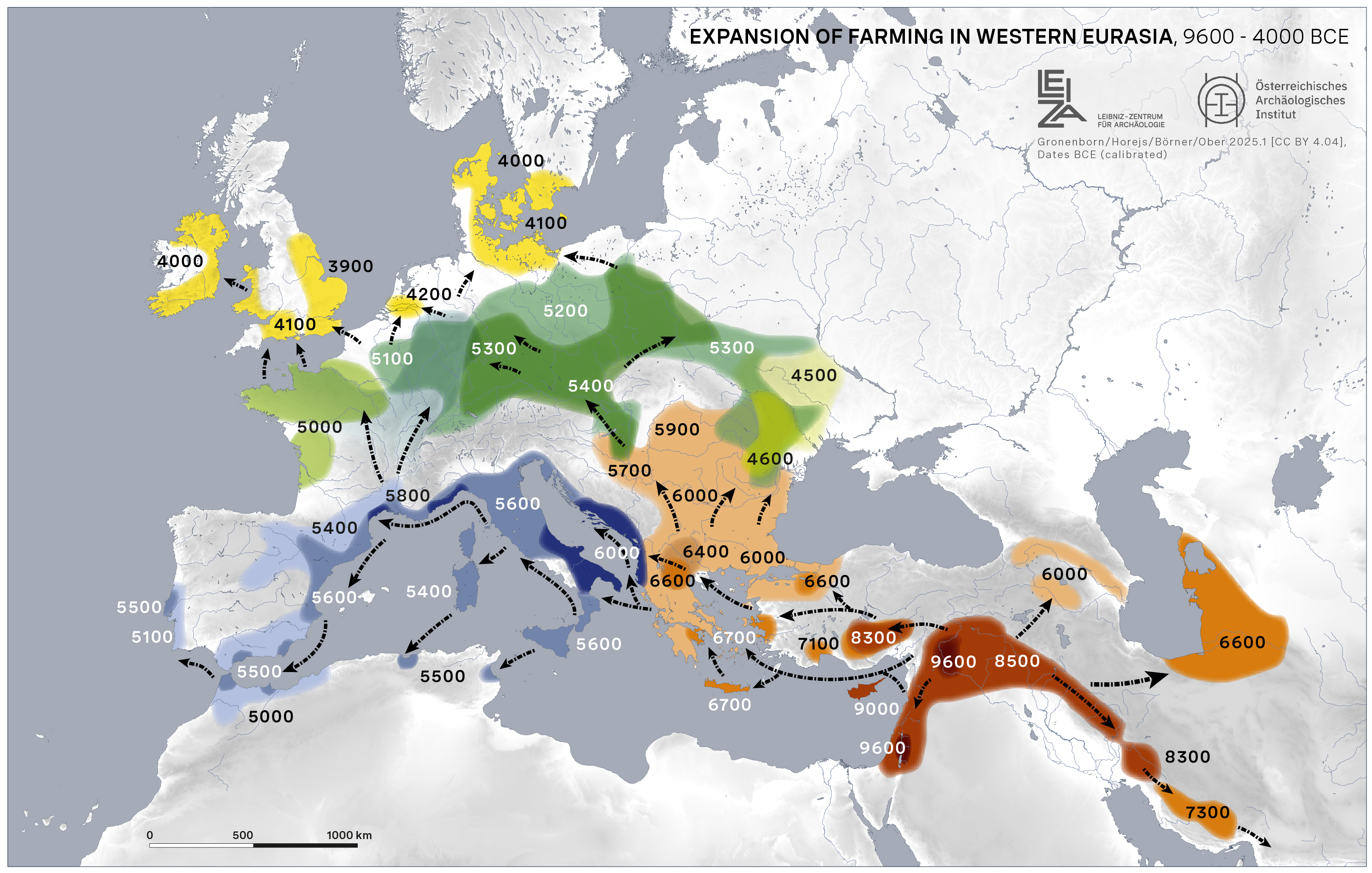
The site of Svinjarička Čuka in southern Serbia occupies a key position for studying Neolithization processes in Eurasia.

== Region and landscape ==
Svinjarička Čuka lies in southern Serbia, in a region with high potential for future archaeological research, particularly concerning the Neolithic period. It is located near the Morava–Vardar river corridor, a major route proposed for the spread of the Neolithic into Europe. The Morava Valley connects the southern Balkans with the Danube corridor and Central Europe. The site is located in the Leskovac Basin, characterised by favourable climatic and ecological conditions.

Svinjarička Čuka is located on a slightly elevated terrace of the Svinjarička River, northeast of Caričin Grad – ancient Justiniana Prima – a Late Antique and Early Byzantine city. The location offered access to fresh water, fertile soils, and raw materials such as lithic resources, wood, and reeds. Its proximity to the South Morava corridor enabled regional and long-distance interaction, while the 300-metre elevation protected the settlement from flooding.

The Leskovac Basin is enclosed by a varied mountain landscape: Vidojevica Planina and the Toplica River to the north, the Radan range to the west, the Kukavica Mountains to the south, and the Babička Gora and Kruševica ranges to the east, with Suva Planina (1810 m) rising beyond. The Grdelička Klisura forms the southern entrance to the basin, through which the South Morava River flows, while the Nišava Valley to the north represents one of the few natural east–west corridors across the Balkans. The site lies within the Pusta Reka catchment, at the confluence of the Caričin and Svinjarički streams. The Radan Mountains act as a natural reservoir, feeding these waterways through springs and runoff and ensuring a reliable water supply. The terrace is flat and fertile, well suited to cultivation, while a nearby plateau – later occupied by Caričin Grad – provided a natural vantage point. Archaeobotanical evidence indicates the use of a variety of both cultivated and wild plant species. The Leskovac region's proximity to other prehistoric sites in neighbouring micro-regions allows for comparative studies of settlement organisation, architecture, technology, material culture, and subsistence strategies within a broader regional framework.

== Survey, research, and excavation history ==
Systematic research at Svinjarička Čuka began in 2017 as part of the "Pusta Reka Research Collaboration", a joint project of the Austrian Archaeological Institute (Austrian Academy of Sciences), the Archaeological Institute in Belgrade, and the National Museum in Leskovac, led by Barbara Horejs and Aleksandar Bulatović. Initial investigations, including field surveys, geo-drilling, geophysical prospection, and both intensive and extensive surveys, identified the site as particularly suitable for studying Early Neolithic contexts.

Stratigraphic and contextual data from domestic features, combined with radiocarbon dating, were used to define six occupation phases within the Early Neolithic, ranging from c. 6100 to 5500 BC. Geophysical surveys revealed clear structural anomalies that guided excavation strategies. From the outset, the project has followed an interdisciplinary approach, integrating archaeology, geoarchaeology, archaeobotany, zooarchaeology, and anthropology. A central focus has been the technological and functional analysis of artefacts, including grinding and pounding tools. Use-wear, starch, and phytolith analyses provide evidence for diet and plant processing, while studies of textile tools, ceramics, and stone implements have yielded insights into the lifeways of the first Neolithic communities in southern Serbia. Ongoing microarchaeological research, including sedaDNA, micromorphology, and isotopic studies, aims to contribute to a "multispecies archaeology" framework.

Recent excavations have uncovered several domestic structures, including two large rectangular buildings with post-built and wattle-and-daub walls. These findings suggest that Early Neolithic communities in the region were more sedentary than previously assumed.

== Site overview ==
=== Chronology and occupation layers ===
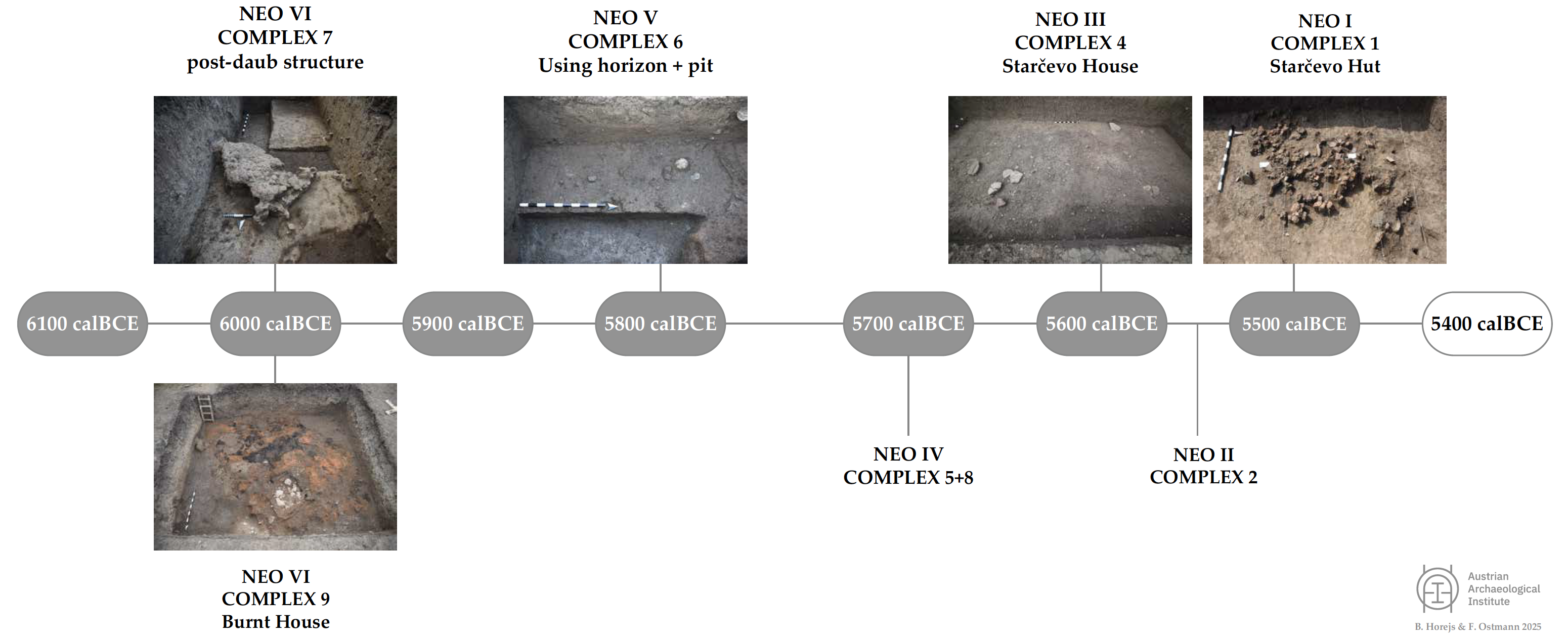
Svinjarička Čuka – Neolithic occupation phases.

The beginning of the Neolithic in the Balkan region is dated between 6200 and 6000 BC. During this period, the transition from hunter-gatherer groups to sedentary, agricultural lifestyles began. This development started at Svinjarička Čuka around 6100 BC. Based on the results of the ongoing 2025 excavations, six occupation phases (NEO VI – NEO I) spanning the early Neolithic have been identified. So far, nine structures have been identified and assigned to different occupation phases. Dating was carried out using the radiocarbon method.

- Phase NEO I (ca. 5500 BC) is represented by Complex 1, a structure of burnt wattle-and-daub, which was interpreted as remains of a house.
- Phase NEO II is not published in details yet.
- Phase III (ca. 5700–5600 BC) is represented by Complex 4, a rectangular house structure in the southern trench, likely used as living space. Further house structures belonging to this phase, are not published in details yet.

( Phase IV (ca. 5700 BC) comprises Complexes 5 and 8. Complex 5 consists of deposits of burnt wattle-and-daub and flat stones within an outdoor activity zone. Complex 8 is a feature with postholes.

- Phase V (ca. 5900–5800 BC) is represented by Complex 6, which includes an activity zone and a pit.
- Phase VI (6100–6000 BC) includes Complexes 7 and 9. Complex 7 consists of architectural remains such as burnt daub, originally applied on a wood and reed construction, and preserved in-situ. Complex 9, located in the northern area, revealed a well-preserved burnt house with several internal installations including bins and other storage facilities.

=== Architectural features ===
The houses were built using locally available materials and consisted of wattle-and-daub constructions. Remaining architectural features are burnt daub, along with postholes which reveal the positions of the main supporting posts using the post in ground technique. Wood, straw, and reed elements decayed due to soil processes and can today only be identified through impressions in the daub, postholes, or microarchaeological methods. Walls and floors were coated with daub and in some cases finished with lime plaster. The postholes identified at Svinjarička Čuka may indicate a gabled roof construction, probably covered with straw. The main supporting posts were often reinforced with larger stones. Comparable building techniques are known from house models from North Macedonia as well as from the Neolithic site of Tumba Madžari near Skopje. The largest houses (Complexes 9 and 4) measured on average about 4 × 7 metres. The interiors reflected the varying functions of the houses. Some buildings contained large, stationary storage vessels, which today can be identified as large collapsed ceramic fragments. In addition, the presence of ovens, filled-in pits, and renewed floors indicates long-term use of the settlement.

=== Soil micromorphology ===
Many research questions that cannot be answered solely through the analysis of material culture can be addressed through the micromorphological analysis of sediments carried out at the site. This method enables the identification of relationships between different materials as well as the chronology of layers on a microscopic scale. Several superimposed layers, for example, may indicate the renewal or repair of architectural elements. For this purpose, undisturbed sediment samples are collected in blocks, impregnated with epoxy resin in the laboratory, and then examined under a polarizing microscope in both plane-polarized light (PPL) and cross-polarized light (XPL). Using this method, key spatial-functional questions could be investigated, such as the building materials used, construction techniques, spatial organization, duration of use, domestic activities, subsistence practices, animal husbandry, and waste management. Based on the research of Lyndelle Webster, bone fragments and traces of dung were identified in and around settlement structures at Svinjarička Čuka, which points to the exploitation and processing of animals, and demonstrates that animals were kept within the settlement itself. Surfaces and floors were difficult to identify due to bioturbation; evidence was mainly provided by higher concentrations of microartifacts, charcoal, daub or bones. In addition, the analysis of wall fragments from a large storage container revealed a sequence of multiple layers. This research is still at an early stage and forms part of the NEOSOL project, which investigates sediment samples from various Neolithic settlements.

== Material culture ==
=== Pottery assemblage ===
More than 10,000 ceramic fragments were recovered from Svinjarička Čuka, including rims, wall sherds, handles, and decorated pieces from jugs and bowls. Vessel shapes are diverse, with globular, conical, and pear-shaped profiles being common. Some vessels have narrow necks, others wide mouths. Distinctive features include pierced knob handles on the belly, likely for hanging, as well as horizontally or vertically attached handles positioned close to the belly or shoulder. Large, heavy vessels were probably used for storage, while smaller, lighter examples served everyday domestic functions. Most vessel surfaces are coarse and undecorated, though various forms of ornamentation occur. Decorations consist mainly of impressions and incised lines made with pointed tools of bone, wood, or stone, and occasionally with fingernails. Some vessels were burnished to improve water resistance, and traces of painting are also attested. Six ceramic fabrics have been defined, ranging from fine clay used for thin-walled vessels to coarser clay with mineral inclusions for thicker forms. Individual fragments were sometimes reused as tools, for example in plant processing, textile production, or pottery manufacture.

=== Stone artefacts ===
Svinjarička Cuka is located within the Neogene Leskovac Basin complex, bordered by the Carpatho-Balkanides in the east and the Serbian-Macedonian Massif in the west and south. During the early to middle Miocene the Serbian Lake System (SLS) extended across this area. Due to extensive volcanic activities, freshwater limestones linked to the SLS were formed along with hydrothermal cryptocrystalline quartz varieties such as chalcedony and jasper. Deposits carrying these siliceous rocks are found in residual deposits along the basin margins and in alluvial basin fills. Due to its specific geological position, the main local lithologies available for stone tool production at Svinjarička Cuka are vulcanites (e.g. andesite), magmatic rocks (e.g. gabbro), metamorphic rocks (e.g. quartzite, gneiss, mica-schist and amphibolite), and sedimentary rocks (e.g. sandstone and chert). Exogenous raw materials used for stone tools at the site are represented by rock crystal, rarely obsidian of Carpathian origin, and so-called "Balkan Flint",. a distinct raw material characteristic for Neolithic assemblages throughout the Balkan region. These non-local materials demonstrate the connectivity of the site's inhabitants within the broader socio-economic networks of the Starčevo cultural phenomenon.

==== Chipped stone tools ====
The Starčevo chipped stone assemblage from Svinjarička Cuka is largely characterized by flake-based technology, with limited attention to blade and bladelet production. Primarily, locally available raw materials were used for the chipped stone industry. The presence of non-local resources, such as "Balkan Flint", indicates the deliberate choice of selected materials, which predominantly appear in the form of ready-made implements (mainly blades) in the assemblage. Generally, retouched tool types are very scarce within the chipped stone assemblage from Svinjarička Cuka, which is in contrast to other contemporaneous sites.

==== Ground stone tools ====
Four primary grinding toolkits were identified from the Neolithic occupation at Svinjarička Cuka. The first two comprise a handstone/netherstone set, consisting of a two-handed active tool paired with a flat support, both made from locally sourced boulders. The second two kits include rotary pestles and mortars. Notably, there is no evidence of preliminary flaking or shaping, suggesting that the boulders were used in their natural form. Functional and contextual analyses indicate that Early Neolithic grinding and pounding tools were primarily used as crushers for processing cereals, possibly pulses, and potentially for pottery production.

=== Visual culture ===
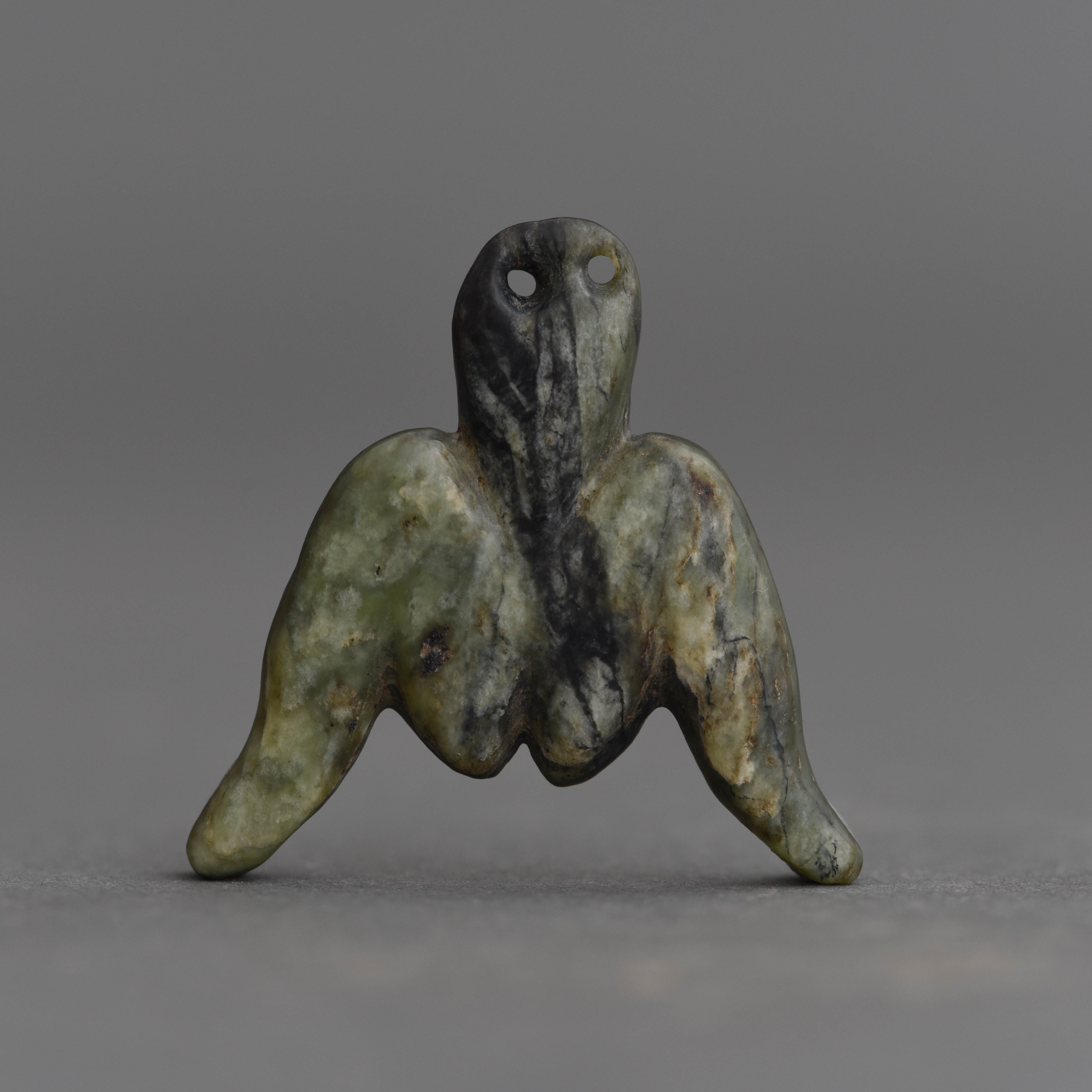
Svinjarička Čuka – Neolithic "Žaba" pendant made from nephrite.

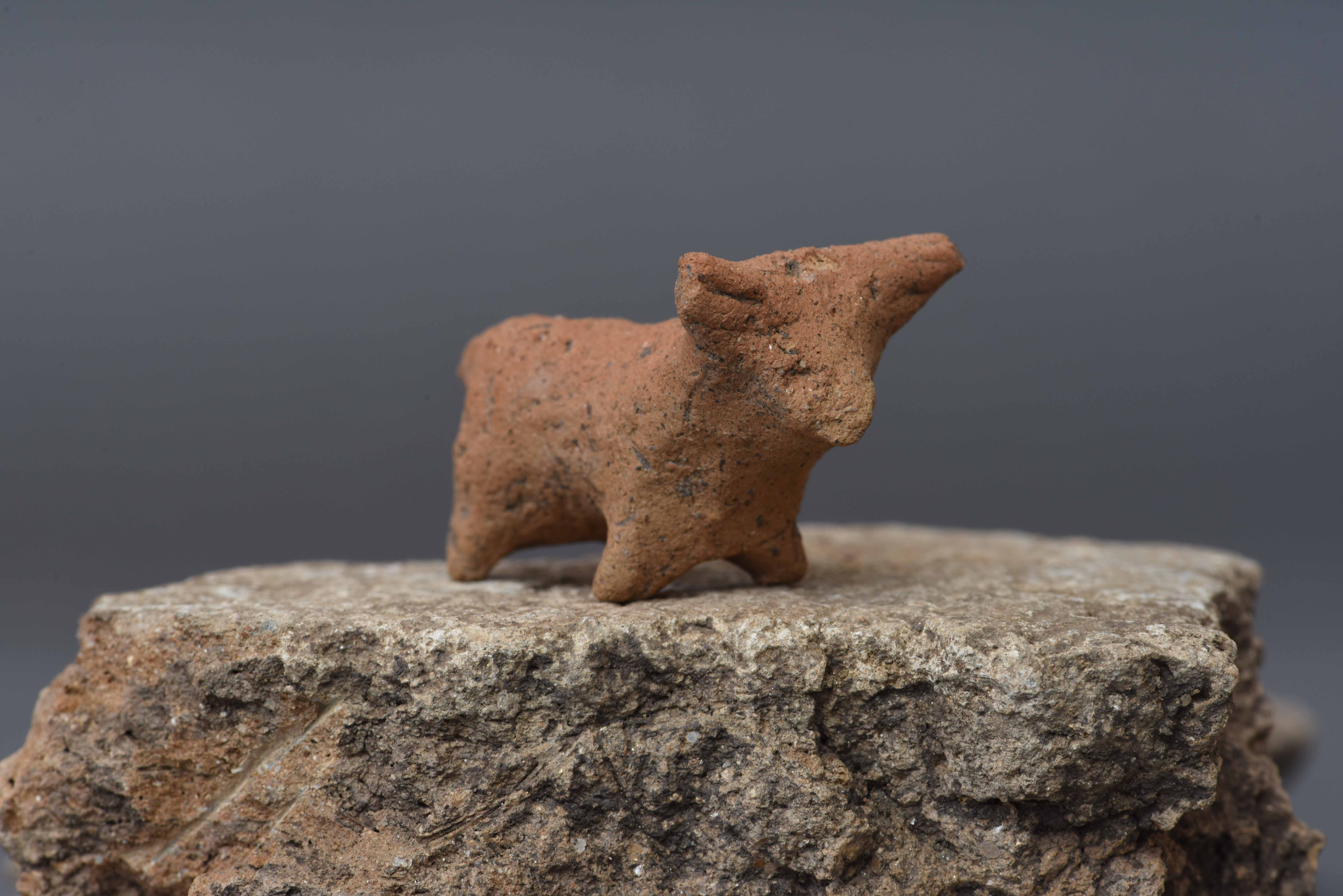
Svinjarička Čuka – Neolithic cattle figurine made from clay.

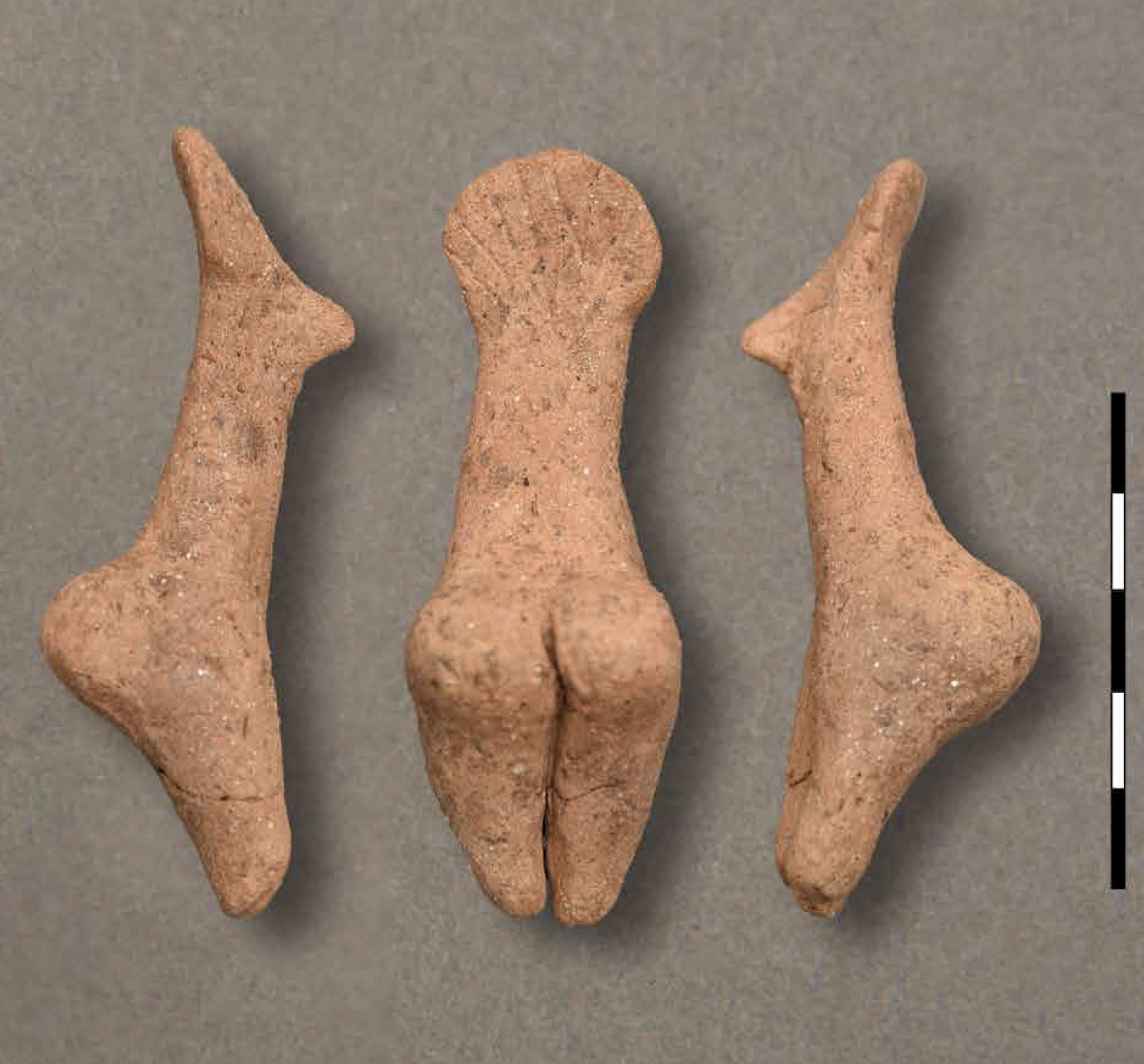
Svinjarička Čuka – Neolithic anthropomorphic figurine.

Neolithic imagery at Svinjarička Čuka is represented by a large number of anthropomorphic figurines, most of which are made of clay. Barbara Horejs, head of the excavation, describes the concept of Neolithic imagery as follows:

"The artefacts offer significant insights into a shared visual language that potentially reflects contemporary ideas and identities, and perhaps even socio-political structures or transcendent perceptions of past societies. Furthermore, the imagery can offer insights into […] the beliefs and worldviews of the prehistoric people". ^{p. 212}

By 2024, a total of 142 figurines had been recovered, 88 from secure Neolithic contexts. Among these, 55 are anthropomorphic and 24 zoomorphic, along with two ceramic vessels bearing face reliefs and a notable frog-shaped pendant made of nephrite. The anthropomorphic figurines are predominantly female, when identifiable, with cylindrical bodies, simplified extremities and faces, pronounced hips and buttocks, and a beak-like nose. Most are fragmented (84%), possibly intentionally broken. The zoomorphic figurines generally depict cattle in miniature form, standing on four short, rounded legs, reflecting the significance of cattle and herding animals in Neolithic life. The so-called Žaba pendant, made of nephrite, depicts a frog-like figure—possibly giving birth—with spread limbs. Use-wear traces suggest it was worn as a pendant. It was found near the "Starčevo House," dated to around 5600 BCE.

=== Beads, annulets, stamps and clay tables ===
Several beads were found at the site, which were probably worn as jewellery. They are mainly made of stone and clay, vary in colour and shape, and show parallels to finds from West Asia and parts of Europe. Clay annulets first appear in the region around 6000 BC. Characteristic find areas in the Central Balkans are the Vardar-Morava region, the Struma Valley, Pelagonia and Thrace. Annulets have been found in northern Serbia, southern Hungary, Romania and Moldova, but are absent from the Aegean, Adriatic and Black Sea regions and parts of the central Europe LBK area. Their function cannot be clearly determined; they may have served as bracelets or ritual pendants. Despite their fragility, different diameters suggest that they were worn by both children and adults. Annulets were apparently not used as grave goods, but in everyday life. Twenty annulets are known from Svinjarička Čuka so far. They date from around 6000 BC and no longer appear after 5500 to 5400 BC. Six types have been defined; the clay material varies and occurs with or without mineral inclusions. By 2024, seven stamps had been found at the site. Stamps made of fired clay were widely used in Southeast Europe and Anatolia from the Neolithic period to the Copper Age. They may have been used to transfer patterns onto textiles, leather, skin, or foodstuffs. The motifs are geometric, often displaying zigzag or wave patterns. Neolithic clay tables (also known as 'cult tables' or altars) may have been used in ritual activities, for example, to display figurines or as small altars. A total of 138 clay tables have been discovered so far, most of which are fragmented. Decorative techniques include impressions and incisions with patterns such as lines, triangles, crosses or applied knobs.

=== Bone tools ===
Bone tools were widely used throughout the Neolithic period. The tools were mainly made from medium-sized mammals such as sheep, goat and cattle, and are also well documented in Serbia and southeast Europe. The tools at Svinjarička Čuka can be distinguished by function: awls, pointed tools, spatulas and spoons, scraping tools and polishing tools. The presence of spoons is especially notable, having also been found in Starčevo Grad, where they were hypothesised to have been used as feeding utensils for children, allowing conclusions to be drawn about childcare practices in the Neolithic period.

== Faunal remains ==
Faunal remains from Svinjarička Čuka provide insight into the diversity and use of animals from the Early Neolithic to the beginning of the Iron Age. A total of 17,003 animal remains were recovered during excavations between 2018 and 2023. These were dated to the Early Neolithic, Eneolithic, Middle and Late Bronze Ages, and the Early Iron Age, and analysed by species and genus. About 90% of the remains were recovered from domestic contexts such as huts, houses, activity zones, and middens dating to the Early Neolithic period. The assemblage is dominated by cattle, dogs, sheep, goats, and pigs, while wild animals account for only around 9% of the Neolithic sample. Occasional remains of fish, birds, and turtles were also identified, though represented by only one or a few specimens. Butchery marks were found on both domesticated and wild animal bones. The faunal material provides information on diet, animal use, and bone working. Some bones were further modified into tools such as needles, smoothing implements, and scrapers, demonstrating a broad utilisation of animal resources in both domestic and craft activities.

== Botanical remains ==
The landscape around Svinjarička Čuka is characterised by a sub-Mediterranean climate. The river terrace on which the site is located supports diverse vegetation, including various species of wood and wild fruits. During the Neolithic, the surroundings likely consisted of small cultivated plots interspersed with wooded areas of ash and elm, as well as stands of light-demanding trees such as dogwood, hazel, and species of Prunus. Oak–hornbeam forests grew in the immediate vicinity. This mosaic environment provided favourable conditions for grazing, hunting, and the gathering of wild resources.

Archaeobotanical evidence indicates the cultivation of einkorn (Triticum monococcum), emmer (Triticum dicoccum), and Timopheev's wheat (Triticum timopheevii), suggesting mixed farming practices. Barley (Hordeum vulgare) was probably grown for animal feed, while lentils (Lens culinaris), peas (Pisum sativum), and flax were likely cultivated in smaller garden plots within or near the settlement. Both cultivated and gathered plants served multiple purposes, including food, fodder, fuel, and building materials.

Plant cultivation and domestication formed a key aspect of the Neolithisation process. Emmer and einkorn were ground into flour with grinding stones to produce bread and similar products, while legumes were crushed and cooked into porridge. Most plant remains are charred, though a few mineralised specimens were also recovered. Charred wood dominates the assemblage, but grain and seed remains from domesticated and wild species are also present. Fruit remains are rare, likely due to soil conditions and the carbonisation process.

== Svinjarička Čuka in the Metal Ages ==
Archaeological evidence from the Leskovac Basin and the wider South Morava region indicates that this area remained a preferred zone of habitation throughout the Metal Ages and was consistently integrated into the major cultural groups of the Central Balkans. Cultural exchange also extended beyond these borders, connecting the region with the Carpathian Basin, the Danube area, and the southern Balkans. The archaeological record suggests a largely continuous socio-cultural development, interrupted only between the 14th and 8th centuries BC, a phase known as the Transitional Period. During this interval between the Late Bronze Age and the Early Iron Age, the South Morava Basin underwent significant changes in material culture and settlement patterns. Ongoing excavations at Svinjarička Čuka mirror these regional developments. The site shows continuous occupation from the Early Neolithic to the Early Iron Age, with the only break corresponding to the Transitional Period.

=== Early Bronze Age ===
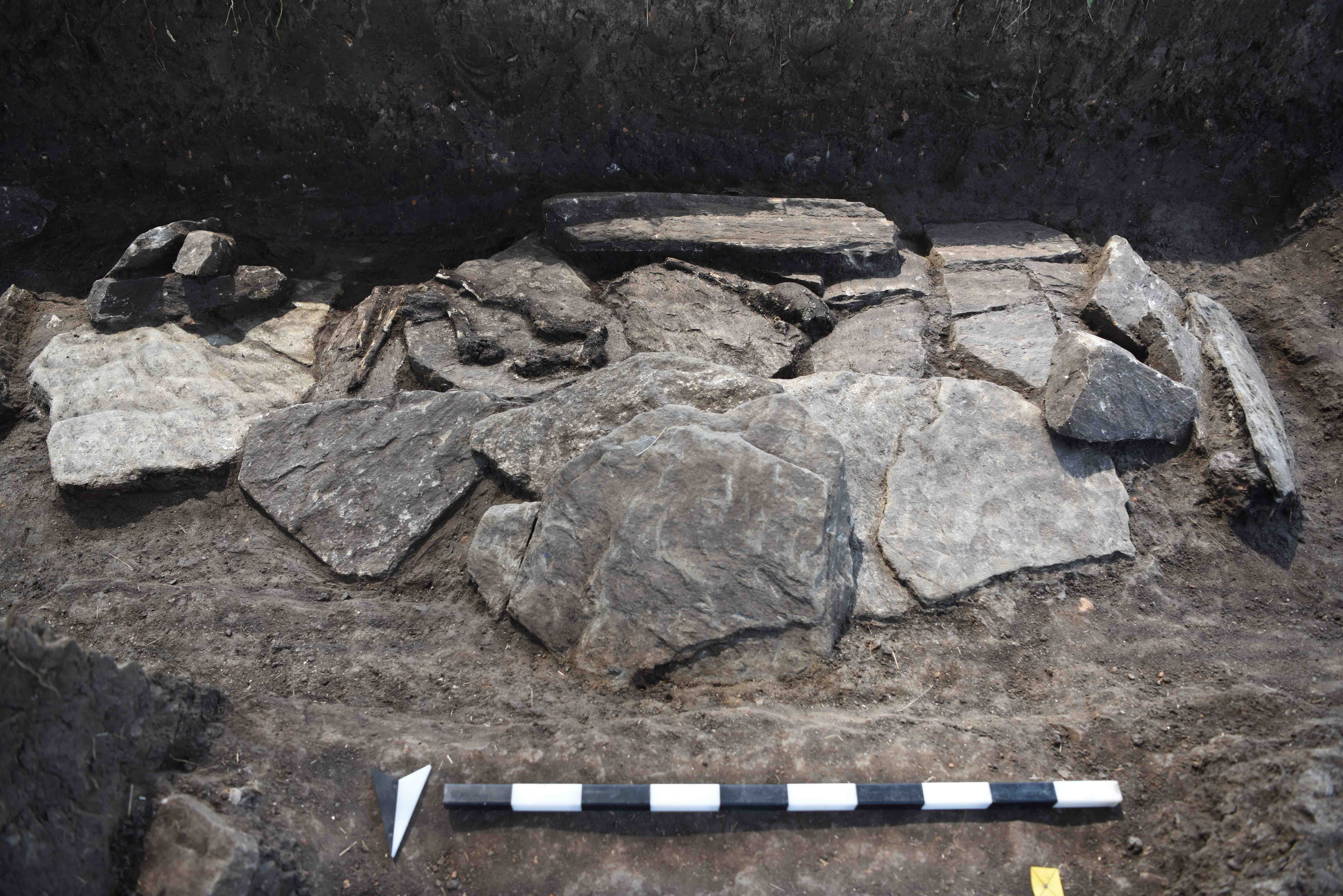
Svinjarička Čuka – Bronze Age Burial.

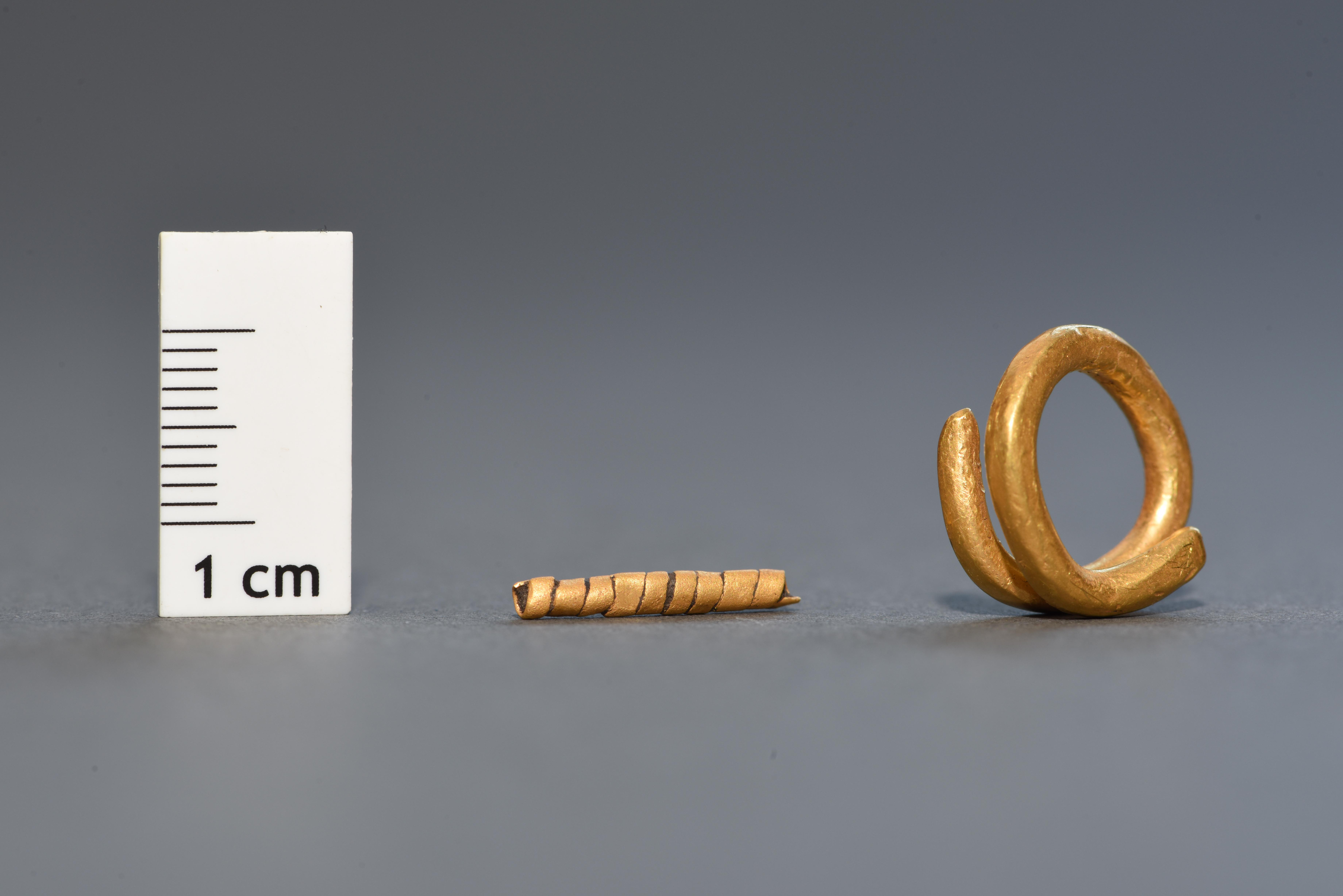
Golden spiral & "Lockenring" from burial context in Svinjarička Čuka.

Occupation layers from the Early Bronze Age (3rd millennium BC) at Svinjarička Čuka are represented by sporadic pottery fragments from mixed contexts, corresponding to the typical assemblage of the Bubanj-Hum III cultural group, which characterises the Early Bronze Age in the Central Balkans.

In 2023, an Early Bronze Age burial was discovered in the central part of the river terrace. Flat stones covered an area of approximately 3.5 × 1.5 metres, forming an elaborately constructed stone cist grave. On the floor of the burial chamber, poorly preserved skeletal remains were uncovered and identified as female through peptide analysis. The woman, aged between 21 and 35 years, was dated by AMS analysis of tooth enamel to between 2469 and 2288 BC. She was laid on her right side in a crouched, west–east-oriented position, with her head facing south, and was adorned with gold jewellery: a Lockenring (spiral earring) made of gold wire and 34 small gold beads measuring 2–5 millimetres.

This exceptional burial is among the few known from this period in Serbia, with parallels found mainly further north in the steppe regions of the Carpathian Basin and the Lower Danube area of Southeast Europe.

=== Middle Bronze Age ===
During the Middle Bronze Age (c. 2000–1600/1500 BC), the Bubanj–Hum IV–Ljuljaci cultural group dominated the Central Balkans. Characteristic pottery of this horizon includes two-handled, pear-shaped cups with trapezoidal openings. At Svinjarička Čuka, this period is represented by numerous scattered finds within the cultural layers and by a pit containing pottery sherds, animal bones, and charcoal. The absolute dates of these features correspond chronologically to the Bubanj–Hum IV–Ljuljaci phase, although no architectural remains attributable to a settlement have yet been identified (Mladenović and Bulatović 2025, 302).

=== Late Bronze Age ===
During the Late Bronze Age (14th–11th centuries BC), the Leskovac Basin formed part of the Brnjica cultural group, characterised by distinctive pottery styles and burial practices. At Svinjarička Čuka, two architectural features from this phase were uncovered. The larger and better-preserved structure, built using wattle-and-daub techniques in the southern trench, contained numerous pottery sherds and vessels, fire dogs, and a rammed-earth oven with a diameter of 0.9 metres.

The ceramic assemblage corresponds to the Brnjica horizon, the principal cultural manifestation of the Late Bronze Age in the Central Balkans and particularly in the South Morava Basin. While typical Brnjica forms – such as plastic rings below the rim and fan-shaped or wishbone handles – are present, the assemblage from Svinjarička Čuka also includes distinctive decorative motifs. These consist of incised triangles and circles, often covering entire vessel surfaces and filled with white incrustation. This local variation, also attested at other sites in the Leskovac Basin, is associated with the formative phase of the Brnjica horizon, placing Svinjarička Čuka within the early stage of the Late Bronze Age.

=== Iron Age ===
In the Leskovac Basin, the Early Iron Age is divided into four phases, of which only the earliest, Iron Age I, has been identified at Svinjarička Čuka through scattered finds and several pits. The pottery assemblage includes typical forms from both sub-phases of Iron Age I, featuring channelled vessels in the earlier phase and incised, impressed, and stamped decorations in the later one. These finds indicate connections initially with the Gava–Belegiš III cultural group and subsequently with groups farther north and east, including Insula–Banului, Kalakača, and Pšeničevo.
