= Kremin (disambiguation) =

Kremin is a Ukrainian-language surname literally meaning "flint".

Kremin may also refer to:

- FC Kremin Kremenchuk, a football club in Kremenchuk, Ukraine
- Kremin Stadium, Kremenchuk, Ukraine

== See also ==
- Kremen (disambiguation)
