= Kremin =

Kremin is a Ukrainian-language surname literally meaning "flint". Notable people with this surname include:

- Dmytro Kremin (1953–2019), Ukrainian poet, journalist, translator, and scholar
- Taras Kremin, Ukrainian schoilar and politician, Language ombudsman

== See also ==
- Kremen (disambiguation)
