= Štulac (Lebane) =

Štulac Штулац (Serbian)
- Village
- Location within Serbia
- Coordinates: 42°56′02″N 21°40′23″E
- Country: Serbia
- District: Jablanica District
- Municipality: Lebane
- Established: c.1516

Area
  - Total: 3.28 sq mi (8.49 km^{2})

Population (2011)
  - Total: 279
- Time zone: UTC+1 (CET)
  - Summer (DST): UTC+2 (CEST)

Štulac is a village in the municipality of Lebane, Serbia. According to the 2011 census, the village had a population of 279. On the territory of the small village there are two archaeological sites. One is the Archaeological sites of exceptional importance Iustiniana Prima, a 6th-century Byzantine city built by the emperor Justinian I, and the other is Svinjarička Čuka locality, a Neolithic settlement, discovered in 2017–2018.

== Location ==
Štulac is located 9.5 km (5.9 mi) southwest of its municipal seat, Lebane. It is connected to Lebane by the road via the village of Prekopčelica.

== Geography ==
The village is located on the valley slopes of the Caričin Potok creek. It is scattered between the altitudes of 300 to 496 m (984 to 1,627 ft). It is situated in the wider Pusta Reka region. The village rests on the western slopes of the Kremen mountain, which here divides the regions of Pusta Reka and Jablanica. On the west, the easternmost slopes of the Radan mountain begin.

The village area covers 8.49 km^{2} (3.28 sq mi).

== History ==
The Slavs settled in the area in the 7th century, centering around the ruins of Iustiniana Prima. Due to the lack of water and fires, they left it in the 8th century. The village was mentioned for the first time in 1516, when one of its hamlets, Caričina Mahala was also mentioned.

Today, the village of Štulac constitutes a local community (mesna zajednica), a sub-municipal administrative unit, within the municipality of Lebane.

== Population ==
Historical population
Year	Pop.	±% p.a.
1948	768	—
1953	782	+0.36%
1961	786	+0.06%
1971	735	−0.67%
1981	626	−1.59%
1991	490	−2.42%
2002	370	−2.52%
2011	279	−3.09%

According to the latest census of population, Štulac had 279 inhabitants in 2011.

The population is mostly Serbian. They were settled in the area in 1879, mostly migrating from the regions of Vlasina and Kriva Reka, near Novo Brdo. The village slava is Transfiguration of Jesus, while most spread individual, family slavas are Saint Archangel Michael and Saint Nicholas.

== Characteristics ==
Štulac is a rural, scattered settlement. It consists of five hamlets: Caričina Mahala, Kodralija, Stojanovce, Donja Mahala and Gornja Mahala. Economically, it is predominantly an agricultural settlement. The village was electrified in 1965, while the water supply is still individual (water wells, springs and local gravitational systems). It has a junior-grade elementary school.

== Archaeological sites ==
=== Svinjarička Čuka ===
In 2017 the archaeological "Pusta Reka Project" started, focusing on the beginning of the Neolithic in the Leskovac Basin. It is a collaborative effort between the OREA Institute (Institute for Oriental and European Archaeology) of the Austrian Academy of Sciences, based in Vienna, and the Institute of Archaeology Belgrade, in cooperation with the National Museum in Leskovac. Funding is provided by the Austrian Science Fund (FWF Project P32096) and heads of the project are Barbara Horejs and Aleksandar Bulatović.

In 2017 several locations in the Leskovac region were surveyed, of which the most promising one was Svinjarička Čuka, near the village of Štulac. An excavation was conducted from 20 August to 28 September 2018. In the top layers an accumulation of pottery and other artifacts from the Late Iron Age were discovered, dated to the first half of the first millennium BC. At a depth of less than a meter, remains from the Late Bronze Age, 1400–1200 BC, were discovered, including agglomerations of fragmented clay vessels, daub, animal bones and household objects like weights and stone and bone tools. Important individual finds include three trapezoid-shaped, almost complete chalices and an anthropomorphic clay figurine, with arms in a position of adoration.

Below these finds was a layer of chronologically mixed materials (Neolithic, Copper Age, Bronze Age) and further below a well preserved Neolithic cultural layer, which was further explored in 2019. The layer was situated only 0.7 m (2 ft 4 in) below the surface and slightly deeper on the southern side with a depth of 1 m (3 ft 3 in). Numerous remains of floor and wall daub as well as abundant fragments of Starčevo type pottery, stone axes, baked clay weights and retouched and polished stone tools were recovered. Based on the shapes and ornaments of the vessels, it is estimated that the settlement belongs to the younger or classical Starčevo phase, at the moment tentatively dated to the first half of the 6th millennium BC. Specific artifacts include several anthropomorphic figurines made of clay, including one showing pregnancy as well as a clay labret, or lip piercing.

However, palaeogeographic drillings from 2017 showed a cultural layer below the depth of 2 m (6 ft 7 in), centuries older than the one excavated in 2018 and dated before 6000 BC. Excavations were continued in August–September 2019, investigating these deeper layers and new terrain on the river terrace the site is situated on. These surveys showed that the locality was continually inhabited during the Middle Neolithic, Late Eneolithic, Middle and Late Bronze Age and Late Iron Age. The oldest discovered artifacts are dated to the mid-6th millennium BC and are typical for the Starčevo culture. Apart from the evidence of continual habitation in the Copper-Bronze-Iron Age eras, finds confirm the suggested theory of gradual habitation of the Pusta Reka region by agricultural communities in the 6000–5500 BC period. Further surveys are scheduled for 2020.
