= Nowth upon Nacht =

Nowth upon Nacht is a song for voice and piano by John Cage. It was composed in 1984 in memoriam for Cathy Berberian, the celebrated soprano singer, wife of composer Luciano Berio.

The text is from page 555–6 of James Joyce's Finnegans Wake, describing the darkest part of the night, and the activities of the characters, each written in a style reflecting their personalities. It follows the lyrical account of Infantina Isobel, who "night by silentsailing night [...] evencalm lay sleeping", which Cage used earlier in The Wonderful Widow of Eighteen Springs. Joyce switches to guttural Germanic language, to describe Joe Sackerson, the drunken Scandinavian watchman of the pub:

nowth upon nacht, while in his tumbril Wachtman Havelook seequeerscenes, from yonsides of the choppy, punkt by his curserbog, went long the grassgross bumpinstrass that henders the pubbel to pass, stowing his bottle in a hole for at whet his whuskle to stretch ecrooksman, sequestering for lovers' lost propertied offices the leavethings from allpurgers' night, og gneiss ogas gnasty, kikkers, brillers, knappers and bands, handsboon and strumpers, sminkysticks and eddiketsflaskers

The vocal line is declamatory and uses a small number of high pitches. The pianist does not touch the keys but produces noises by opening and shutting the piano lid three times, with the sustain pedal depressed. The piece is intended to be performed directly after The Wonderful Widow of Eighteen Springs.

== Editions ==
- Edition Peters 67039. (c) 1984 by Henmar Press.

== See also ==
- List of compositions by John Cage
- A Flower
