= Barbara Kremen =

American writer (1922–2022)

Barbara Herman Kremen (February 13, 1922 – August 15, 2022) was an American writer whose work consisted of fiction, poetry, and literary essays.

Her publications include Out Of, a poetry collection; Tree Trove, a botanical fantasy on trees for children and adults; The Damsel Fly and Other Stories; and essays and poems published in Sewanee Review, Pembroke Magazine, Philological Quarterly, and Romance Notes.

Kremen's style has been described as:

"Crisscrossing of scientific and literary languages, a practice that makes us aware of the multiple and often fractured ways in which we seize other species for our purposes- psychological, aesthetic, folkloric, and scientific.."

— Catherine Gallagher, The Scales of Life in Barbara Kremen's Short Stories

== Biography ==
Kremen was born on February 13, 1922, in New Jersey, where she was also raised. She received a B.A. from Bryn Mawr College and an M.A. from Harvard University in English. She undertook further studies at the Sorbonne and in the graduate program in French and English literature at the University of North Carolina at Chapel Hill.

During World War II, Kremen joined the WAC and worked as a journalist at Camp Shanks, New York, a staging area for the European Theatre, and then with the Army News Service in New York City where she wrote feature articles. After the war she spent three years abroad in France and later in Ascona, Switzerland, where she formed lifelong friendships within a circle of writers, artists and musicians, including: Aline Valangin, Wladimir Vogel, Italo Valenti (1912–1995), and Werner Rings (1910–1998).

Following her return to New York, Kremen worked as a writer and a researcher on folk costume at the Costume Institute of the Metropolitan Museum of Art, and as an English teacher in private high schools in Brooklyn and Cambridge, Massachusetts. While in New York she formed friendships with John Cage, Merce Cunningham, M. C. Richards and David Tudor.

Kremen was married to the artist and professor of psychology emeritus at Duke University, Irwin Kremen, until his death in February 2020. Barbara Kremen resided in North Carolina, where she died at home in Durham on August 15, 2022, at the age of 100.

== Publications ==
- Kremen, Barbara. 2006. The Damsel Fly and Other Stories. Edmonds, WA: Ravenna Press. OCLC 70215424
- Kremen, Barbara. 1996. Out of. Italy: Lucini Libri. OCLC 36390950
- Kremen, Barbara H. 1985. Tree Trove. Laurinburg, N.C.: St. Andrews Presbyterian College. OCLC 12432391

== Bibliography ==
- Kremen, Irwin. "From That Day to This," pp. 31–38, in Irwin Kremen: Beyond Black Mountain, 1966–2006. Durham, NC, Nasher Museum of Art, 2007.
