= Voices and Instruments =

Studio album by Jan Steele and John Cage
- Released: 1976
- Label: Obscure Records

Voices and Instruments is a 1976 album by saxophonist Jan Steele and composer John Cage. The album was the fifth release on Brian Eno's Obscure Records.

This release had the catalogue number Obscure no.5. In common with most of the releases on Obscure it was recorded at Basing Street Studios in London, produced by Brian Eno and engineered by Rhett Davies.

Professional ratings
Review scores
Source	Rating
Christgau's Record Guide	B+

== Track listing and personnel ==
=== Side one ===
All compositions by Jan Steele

1. All Day (7:13) - Guitar – Stuart Jones, Vibraphone – Kevin Edwards, Guitar – Fred Frith, Percussion – Phil Buckle, Lyrics – James Joyce, Bass – Steve Beresford, Voice – Janet Sherbourne
2. Distant Saxophones (10:42) - Bass – Steve Beresford, Percussion – Arthur Rutherford, Piano – Martin Mayes, Flute – Jan Steele, Utako Ikeda, Viola – Dominic Muldowney
3. Rhapsody Spaniel (5:21) - Piano – Jan Steele, Janet Sherbourne

=== Side two ===
All compositions by John Cage

1. Experiences No.1 (3:52) - Piano – Richard Bernas (composed for the Merce Cunningham choreographed piece 'Experiences')
2. Experiences No.2 (4:50) - Voice – Robert Wyatt, Lyrics – the poem 'it is at moments after i have dreamed' by E. E. Cummings (composed for the Merce Cunningham choreographed piece 'Experiences')
3. The Wonderful Widow of Eighteen Springs (2:26) - Percussion – Richard Bernas, Voice – Robert Wyatt, Lyrics – reworked from Finnegans Wake by James Joyce (composed for Janet Fairbank)
4. Forever and Sunsmell (6:23) - Percussion – Richard Bernas, Voice – Carla Bley, Lyrics – the poem 'wherelings whenlings' by E. E. Cummings (composed for Jean Erdman)
5. In a Landscape (10:37) - Piano – Richard Bernas (composed for Louise Lippold)
