= The Wonderful Widow of Eighteen Springs =

1942 song by John Cage

The Wonderful Widow of Eighteen Springs is a song for voice and closed piano by John Cage. It was composed in late 1942 and quickly became a minor classic in Cage's oeuvre. The text was a reworked version of a passage from James Joyce's Finnegans Wake.

== General information ==
The song was commissioned by singer Janet Fairbank, who later became known for pioneering contemporary music. Cage chose to set a passage from page 556 of Finnegans Wake, a book he bought soon after its publication in 1939. The composition is based, according to Cage himself, on the impressions received from the passage. The Wonderful Widow of Eighteen Springs marks the start of Cage's interest in Joyce and is the first piece among many in which he uses the writer's work.

The vocal line only uses three pitches, while the piano remains closed and the pianist produces sounds by hitting the lid or other parts of the instrument in a variety of ways (with his fingers, with his knuckles, etc.). Almost immediately after its composition the song became one of Cage's most frequently performed works, and was several times performed by the celebrated duo of Cathy Berberian and Luciano Berio. Cage later composed another piece for voice and closed piano, A Flower, and a companion piece to The Wonderful Widow of Eighteen Springs, called Nowth upon Nacht, also based on Joyce's book.

In 1976, Robert Wyatt performed a version on the split LP Voices and Instruments attributed to Jan Steele and John Cage, produced by Brian Eno and released on his Obscure Records label. In 1993, Joey Ramone performed a version on the compilation Caged/Uncaged – A Rock/Experimental Homage To John Cage.

== Editions ==
- Edition Peters 6297. (c) 1961 by Henmar Press.

== See also ==
- List of compositions by John Cage
