= Army News Service =

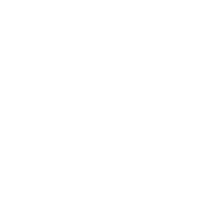
- Industry: News agency
- Founded: 1943
- Headquarters: Arlington County, Virginia
- Website: www.army.mil/ARNews

The Army News Service (ARNEWS) is a news publication of the United States Army (published by their Special Services Division) designed as an "objective digest of United States press association and newspaper reports". The material was in turn supplied to the American Forces Network for radio transmission. Created in 1943, its target audience is the large number of people associated with the US Army, including soldiers, retired soldiers, and contractors. The Army News Service partners with Soldiers Magazine and Soldiers Radio and Television (SRTV).

== Coverage ==
The Army News Service publications focus on covering Army wide strategic communications initiatives at Department of the Army headquarters. Reporters cover topics such as, new Army policy, pay and benefits, new equipment and new programs emphasized by Army leadership. The service relies on submissions from service members in the field for topics such as major military exercises and operations, pilot programs and new military equipment arriving in the field.
