= Prekopčelica =

Prekopčelica Прекопчелица (Serbian)
- Village
- Location within Serbia
- Coordinates: 42°56′43″N 21°41′25″E
- Country: Serbia
- District: Jablanica District
- Municipality: Lebane

Population (2002)
  - Total: 508
- Time zone: UTC+1 (CET)
  - Summer (DST): UTC+2 (CEST)

Prekopčelica is a village in the municipality of Lebane, Serbia. According to the 2002 census, the village has a population of 508 people. During the Ottoman period, it was a local center with around 2000 inhabitants, before the neighbouring village of Lebane gained in importance due to textile industry. Close to the village is the archaeological site Justiniana Prima, a town founded in the 6th century.
