= Kremen, Krško =

Kremen
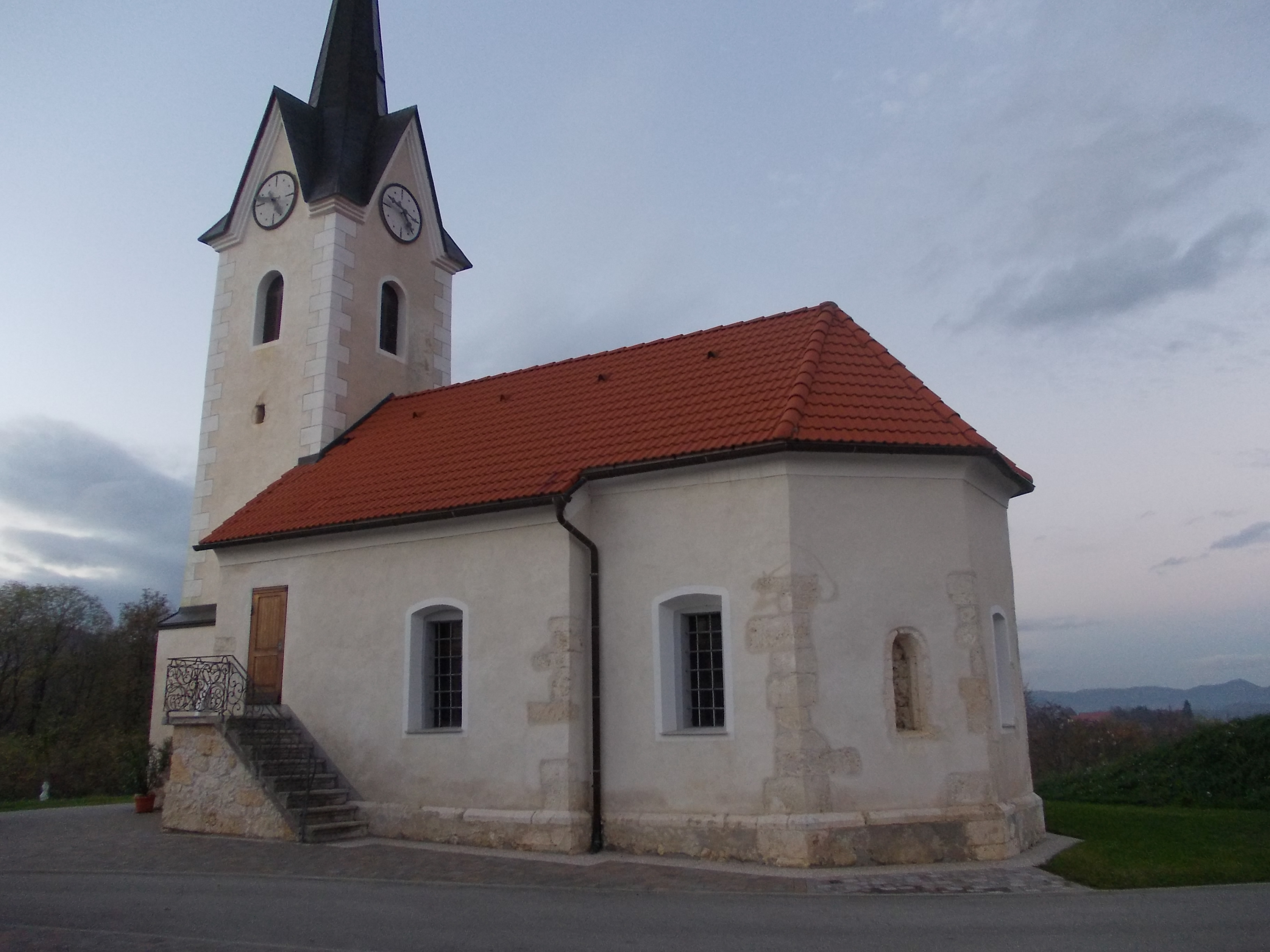
- St. Primus and Felician Church, Kremen

- Location in Slovenia
- Coordinates: 45°58′3.13″N 15°30′37.6″E
- Country: Slovenia
- Traditional region: Styria
- Statistical region: Lower Sava
- Municipality: Krško

Area
  - Total: 1.52 km^{2} (0.59 sq mi)
- Elevation: 306.2 m (1,005 ft)

Population (2002)
  - Total: 204
- Postal code: 8270

Kremen (pronounced [ˈkɾɛːmɛn]) is a settlement in the hills immediately northeast of the town of Krško in eastern Slovenia. The area is part of the traditional region of Styria. It is now included with the rest of the municipality in the Lower Sava Statistical Region.

The local church is dedicated to Saints Primus and Felician and belongs to the Parish of Videm–Krško. It has a rectangular nave with a three-sided apse and dates to 1654. The main altar is from the 18th century.
