= Irwin Kremen =

American artist (1925–2020)

- Born: June 5, 1925; Chicago, Illinois, U.S.
- Died: February 5, 2020 (aged 94); Durham, North Carolina, U.S.
- Education: Northwestern University, Black Mountain College Harvard University
- Style: Collage, sculpture, painting, multimodes
- Website: www.irwinkremen.com

Irwin Kremen (June 5, 1925 – February 5, 2020) was an American artist who began making art while Director of the Duke University Graduate Program in Clinical Psychology, when he was 41, after earning a PhD six years earlier in clinical psychology at Harvard University.

Kremen's artwork mainly consists of non-representational collage, sculpture, and painting. In his later years he defined a fourth grouping which he called "multimodes." These are syntheses of the other three or sometimes of just two. Early on, he worked in the first three modes but in 1969, while on sabbatical in Florence, Italy as a Fellow at Villa I Tatti, the Harvard Center for Renaissance Studies, he began to compose collages of weathered paper and continued this for a decade. Becoming unhappy with conventional methods of gluing collage elements, he developed a conservational method of affixing the disparate pieces together via tiny hinges of Japanese paper.

In the late 1970s, while continuing collage making, Kremen returned to three-dimensional work, now in iron and scrap steel, and by the later '90s entered a collaboration with the sculptor William Noland. Over the next decade they made monumentally sized works, three of which were exhibited in Kremen's 2007 retrospective at Duke University's Nasher Museum of Art. He also sporadically resumed work with acrylic paints and toward the late '90s began making painted panels below which were rows of collages arranged rhythmically.

Among Kremen's major works is the Re'eh Series, a single work relative to the Holocaust, consisting of 11 narrative collages.

== Life ==
Kremen was born and raised in Chicago, and attended Northwestern University for two-and-a-half years before leaving in 1945 to become a reporter on ‘’The Chicago Journal of Commerce’’. By that time he had independently encountered avant-garde art and modern literature and had begun writing poetry. Whereupon, in 1946, he left Chicago for the renowned Black Mountain College, an experimental educational community founded in 1933 near Asheville, N.C. There Kremen spent his time focussed on writing and the literature classes given by the poet M. C. Richards.

Beginning in 1947 and for the next eight years he lived in Greenwich Village, writing, reading widely, working variously in bookstores and in publishing, and broadening his knowledge of art and its history. And he became involved with the avant-garde circle around John Cage to whom he had been introduced by M.C. Richards in 1951 in New York City, as also to David Tudor and Merce Cunningham. In 1953 Cage dedicated to Kremen the score of 4'33" in proportional notation, as later he also did the Tacet versions of 4'33", the published editions of the so-called silent piece. During that time he married Barbara Herman whom he had met at a Cage concert; completed a B.A. at The New School for Social Research; and went on to obtain a PhD in clinical psychology at Harvard University. With his wife Barbara Kremen and their two children he left Cambridge for a professorial position on the faculty of the Psychology Department at Michigan State University. Two years later he joined that faculty at Duke University, and in another three years, in 1966, made his first work of art. He retired from Duke in 1992, and continued to make art.

He died in Durham, North Carolina in February 2020 at the age of 94.

== Art ==
In 1977, after having kept his art private for twelve years, Kremen, then 54, agreed to an exhibition organized by the Smithsonian Institution's National Collection of Fine Arts (now the Smithsonian American Art Museum) with two solo venues, the first in 1978 at the Southeastern Center for Contemporary Art (SECCA) in Winston-Salem, NC, and the second in 1979, at its Museum in Washington. Twenty-nine solo venues followed, all but two in museums or contemporary art centers, and his work has been included in 27 group shows. The first exhibit of the Re'eh Series was held in 1985 at the Rose Art Museum at Brandeis University in Waltham, MA; nine other exhibits of it have followed. In the spring of 2007, the Nasher Museum of Art presented Kremen's first retrospective. It included more than 172 works – collage, painting and sculpture – spanning each of the 40 years of Kremen's art-making since he began at age 41. In 2011, the Black Mountain College Museum + Arts Center in Asheville, NC held an exhibit of Kremen's late work.

== Selected exhibitions ==
- 2017. Irwin Kremen/ Matrix 265. Berkeley Art Museum & Pacific Film Archive at University of California, Berkeley. April 26 - August 27, 2017.
- 2011. In Site: Late Works by Irwin Kremen. Black Mountain College Museum + Art Center, Asheville, North Carolina, February 18 – June 4, 2011 and The Phillips Museum of Art, Lancaster, PA, August 31 – October 13, 2011
- 2007. Irwin Kremen: Beyond Black Mountain (1966–2006). Nasher Museum of Art at Duke University, Durham, North Carolina, March 22, 2007 – June 17.
- 2004. Three in One: Collage, Painting, Sculpture by Irwin Kremen ACA Galleries, New York City, March 20 – April 10.
- 2000. As Such: Collage and Sculpture by Irwin Kremen, 1975–2000. Chicago Cultural Center, Chicago, Illinois, May 13 – July 9.
- 1999. Seescape: Collages by Irwin Kremen. Mississippi Museum of Art, Jackson, Mississippi, October 24, 1998 – January 17, 1999.
- 1999. The Re’eh Series, Collages by Irwin Kremen: In Memory of the Victims of the Holocaust. Telfair Museum of Art, Savannah, Georgia, September 14 – November 28.
- 1997. C#: Collage and Sculpture by Irwin Kremen. Contemporary Arts Center, New Orleans, Louisiana, October 4 – November 16.
- 1996. C#: Collage and Sculpture by Irwin Kremen, including the Re'eh Series. Green Hill Center for North Carolina Art, Greensboro, North Carolina, September 8 – October 27.
- 1993. Rolywholyover: A Circus. The Museum of Contemporary Art, Los Angeles, California, September 12 – November 28.
- 1992. The Black Mountain Connection: John Cage, Merce Cunningham, Irwin Kremen, M.C. Richards. Tampa Museum of Art, Tampa, Florida, September 13 – November 22.
- 1991. The Art of Irwin Kremen. City Art Gallery, Toyama Citizens' Plaza, Toyama, Japan, April 10 – May 6.
- 1990. The Art of Irwin Kremen. Duke University Museum of Art, Durham, North Carolina, November 16 – December 31.
- 1990. From the 2nd Decade: Collages, Sculptures, and the Re'eh Series by Irwin Kremen, 1979 – 1989. Wichita Art Museum, Wichita, Kansas, January 14 – February 25.
- 1988. per se: Collages & Other Works by Irwin Kremen. Gallery 400, University of Illinois at Chicago, Chicago, Illinois, February 17 – March 19.
- 1987. In Plain View: The Collages of Irwin Kremen. Memphis Brooks Museum of Art, Memphis, Tennessee, September 27 – November 5.
- 1985. SE Ǝ!: Collages including 10 additional by Irwin Kremen. Albright-Knox Art Gallery, Buffalo, New York, June 4 – July 28.
- 1985. SE Ǝ!: Collages by Irwin Kremen. The Brooklyn Museum, Brooklyn, New York, March 15 – May 14.
- 1983. Collages by Irwin Kremen, 1976 – 1983. Museum of Art, Carnegie Institute, Pittsburgh, Pennsylvania, September 17 – November 13.
- 1979. Collages by Irwin Kremen. The National Collection of Fine Arts, Smithsonian Institution, Washington, DC, January 26 – March, 25.
- 1978. Irwin Kremen, Collages. The Southeastern Center for Contemporary Art Winston-Salem, North Carolina, September 8 – October 22.

== Collections ==
- Legion of Honor, Achenbach Foundation for Graphic Arts, The Fine Arts Museums of San Francisco
- Ackland Art Museum, University of North Carolina at Chapel Hill
- Allentown Art Museum
- Arkansas Arts Center
- The Art Institute of Chicago
- Berkeley Art Museum and Pacific Film Archive
- Birmingham Museum of Art
- Black Mountain College Museum + Arts Center
- Blanton Museum of Art, The University of Texas at Austin
- The Carnegie Museum of Art
- Eli and Edythe Broad Art Museum at Michigan State University
- Getty Research Institute
- Mary and Leigh Block Museum of Art, Northwestern University
- Museum of Fine Arts, Boston
- The Museum of Fine Arts, Houston
- The Museum of Modern Art (MoMA)
- Nasher Museum of Art at Duke University
- National Gallery of Art
- Philadelphia Museum of Art
- Rhode Island School of Design Museum
- Rose Art Museum, Brandeis University
- Sheldon Memorial Art Gallery, University of Nebraska—Lincoln
- Smart Museum of Art, The University of Chicago
- Smith College Museum of Art
- Smithsonian American Art Museum
- Wichita Art Museum
- Yale University Art Gallery
