= Jess Damuck =

American food writer

Jess Damuck is an American New York Times best-selling food writer, chef, food stylist, and artist.

== Early life ==
Damuck grew up in Shelter Island, an only child. Her family traveled to Vermont frequently, visiting the Brattleboro Food Co-op, her "first true exposure to a hippie store and a health food restaurant." She began cooking around age seven, utilizing recipes from her American Girl Doll Cookbooks. She attended a private high school called the Ross School.

== Education ==
Damuck aspired to be an orthopedic surgeon prior to becoming a cook and writer. She worked for the Hospital for Special Surgery in New York while studying for her MCATs. Ultimately, she decided she did not want to work in a context where she would be confined to one room for hours at a time, so she dropped the profession in favor of culinary school. During school, she worked for a restaurant called Planet Bliss, which she had started employment with in high school; it was there that the proprietor introduced her to the concept that food "doesn’t have to be boring or bland."

== Career ==
Prior to her independent career, Damuck worked as Martha Stewart's assistant for a decade, helping create television shows and magazines, initially interning for Stewart and gaining employment subsequently. She attended the French Culinary Institute at night. She eventually became Stewart's personal salad chef.

In 2022, Damuck published Salad Freak, which became a New York Times bestseller. In March 2024, Damuck published Health Nut, a "throwback to ‘70s California health food." In April 2024, Damuck co-authored Open Wide: A Cookbook for Friends―Fun and Easy Recipes for Food Freaks with music producer Benny Blanco.

== Activism ==
In June 2025, it was announced that Damuck would appear as a panelist at the environmental education event the Garden of Tomorrow Festival in Los Angeles alongside Bonnie Wright, Kristen Caissie, and others.

== Bibliography ==
- Salad Freak, Abrams Books, 2022 (ISBN 978-1419758393)
- Health Nut, Abrams Books, 2024 (ISBN 978-1419770371)
- Open Wide: A Cookbook for Friends―Fun and Easy Recipes for Food Freaks, Dey Street Books, 2024 (ISBN 978-0063315938)

== Personal life ==
Damuck's partner is Ben Sinclair, creator of High Maintenance. She and Sinclair moved to Los Angeles during the COVID-19 pandemic.
