= A Flower =

Song by John Cage

A Flower is a song for voice and closed piano by John Cage. It was composed in 1950, for a choreography by Louise Lippold, wife of sculptor Richard Lippold. There is no text; the singer vocalises a small number of phonemes such as "uh", "wah", etc., without vibrato. Instructions given in the score include, for some passages, "like a pigeon" and "like a wild duck". The entire vocal line is constructed of just four pitches, except for a single bar near the end where a fifth pitch is used. The pianist plays by hitting the piano lid in various ways - with his fingers, with his knuckles, etc. The composition is somewhat similar to the earlier work for voice and closed piano, The Wonderful Widow of Eighteen Springs.

== Editions ==
- Edition Peters 6711. (c) 1960 by Henmar Press.

== See also ==
- List of compositions by John Cage
- Nowth upon Nacht
