= Extended technique =

Unorthodox methods of singing or of playing musical instruments

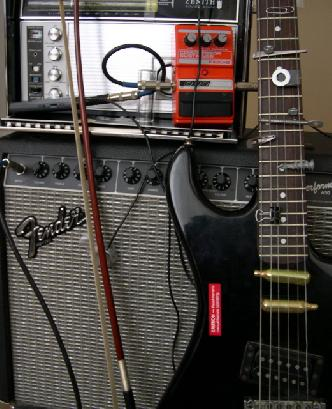
A prepared guitar, in which various metal objects have been inserted between the strings and the neck

In music, extended technique is unconventional, unorthodox, or non-traditional methods of singing or of playing musical instruments employed to obtain unusual sounds or timbres.

Composers' use of extended techniques is not specific to contemporary music (for instance, Hector Berlioz's use of col legno in his Symphonie Fantastique is an extended technique) and it transcends compositional schools and styles. Extended techniques have also flourished in popular music. Nearly all jazz performers make significant use of extended techniques of one sort or another, particularly in more recent styles like free jazz or avant-garde jazz. Musicians in free improvisation have also made heavy use of extended techniques.

Examples of extended techniques include bowing under the bridge of a string instrument or with two different bows, using key clicks on a wind instrument, blowing and overblowing into a wind instrument without a mouthpiece, or inserting objects on top of the strings of a piano.

Twentieth-century exponents of extended techniques include Henry Cowell (use of fists and arms on the keyboard, playing inside the piano), John Cage (prepared piano), and George Crumb. The Kronos Quartet, which has been among the most active ensembles in promoting contemporary American works for string quartet, frequently plays music which stretches the manner in which sound can be drawn out of instruments.

== Examples ==
=== Vocal ===
- Sprechstimme (speech-singing)
- overtone singing (harmonic singing, or vocal multiphonics)
- ululation
- beatboxing (vocal percussionists)
- growling
- screaming and shouting
- whispering
- panting
- whistling
- hissing
- clucking
- barking
- sucking

=== Bowed string instruments ===
- playing with a plectrum or pick
- playing with percussion sticks, mallets, or other objects
- bowing on the "wrong" side of the left hand fingers
- bowing behind the bridge
- bowing non-string parts of the instrument
- parallel rather than perpendicular bowing
- exaggerated vibrato
- snap pizzicato, also called Bartók pizzicato
- tapping or rubbing the soundboard of stringed instruments
- string scrapes with finger, nail, or object
- percussive effects on body of instrument
- tapping on the fingerboard
- "seagull" harmonic effects
- detuning a string while playing
- preparation
- resonance effects

=== Plucked string instruments ===
- using a bow
- playing with percussion sticks, mallets, or other objects
- playing on crossed strings (called "snare drum effect" on guitar)
- snap pizzicato, in which a string is pulled away from the fingerboard until it snaps back and strikes the fingerboard
- string scrapes, a technique especially associated with electric guitar and electric bass, as played with a pick
- percussive effects, such as drumming on a string instrument body
- palm and finger muting ("pizzicato")
- tapping on the fingerboard
- string pops and slaps (fingerboard instruments)
- preparation of a guitar by inserting screws or pieces of metal in the bridge or between the strings
- detuning a string while playing
- "3rd bridge", a guitar technique using the part of the string between the nut and the stopping finger; see Xenakis' cello piece Nomos Alpha for a similar effect.

=== Piano ===
- prepared piano, i.e., introducing foreign objects into the workings of the piano to change the sound quality
- string piano, i.e., striking, plucking, or bowing the strings directly, or any other direct manipulation of the strings
- resonance effects (whistling, singing or talking into the piano)
- silently depressing one or more keys, allowing the corresponding strings to vibrate freely, allowing sympathetic harmonics to sound
- touching the strings at node points to create harmonics
- percussive use of different parts of the piano, such as the outer rim
  - slamming piano lid or keyboard cover
- microtones
- use of the palms, fists, or external devices to create tone clusters
- use of other materials to strike the keys
- pedal noises

=== Woodwind instruments ===
- multiphonics
- harmonics
- pitch bends ("lipping")
- noisily activating keys without blowing
- combination of a mouthpiece of one instrument with the main body of another, for example, using an alto saxophone mouthpiece on a standard trombone
- flutter-tonguing
- breath noises
- blowing a disengaged mouthpiece or reed
- singing through the instrument while playing
- internal muting
- key or tone-hole slap – percussive sound made by slapping a key or keys against their tone holes
- circular breathing
- slap tonguing

=== Brass instruments ===
- singing through the instrument while playing
- exaggerated brass head-shakes
- noisily activating valves without blowing
- pitch bends ("lipping")
- combination of a mouthpiece of one instrument with the main body of another, for example, using a French horn mouthpiece on a standard bassoon
- flutter tonguing
- circular breathing
- double buzz
- half-valve playing
- unconventional mutes or other foreign objects in the bell (e.g. plumbing parts)
- breath noises
- blowing a disengaged mouthpiece

=== Percussion ===
- rudimental or "dynamic" double bass on the drum set, using hand rudiments such as double stroke rolls and flam taps and playing them with the feet
- stacking two or more cymbals, one on top of the other, to change the sound properties of the instrument
- bowed vibraphone, cymbals, and gongs
- resonance effects (e.g., cymbal played on a timpani; cow bell struck against a bass drum, etc.)
- pitch bends on mallet percussion
- harmonics
- custom-built percussion mallets, occasionally made for vibraphone or tubular bells (and other pitched-percussion in increasingly rare circumstances) which feature more than one mallet-head, and so are capable of producing multiple pitches and difficult chords (though usually only the chords they were designed to play). These mallets are seldom used, and percussionists sometimes make them themselves when they are needed. When implemented, they are usually only used once or twice in an entire work, and are alternated with conventional mallets; usually they are used only when playing a different instrument in each hand.
- striking a gong and then inserting the vibrating metal into a tub of water, creating a glissando
- placing a cymbal on a timpani head

=== Electronic ===
- added electronics or MIDI control
- Turntablism, such as scratching records or otherwise manipulating a record or turntable platter, often done in combination with a DJ mixer, to create unique sound effects and rhythms
- using a "kill switch" on an electric guitar to create quasi-scratching rhythmic sounds
- circuit bending: DIY experimenting with electronic keyboards and electronic toys
- playing electric instruments unplugged, or amplifying acoustical parts of normally electronic instruments (e.g. finger noise on the keys)
- exploitation of inherent equipment "defects" (e.g., deliberately driving digital equipment into aliasing; exaggerating hum or hiss coming from speakers, acoustic feedback, key click on a Hammond organ etc.)

=== Organ ===
Playing on stops that are partially drawn (has an effect only if the stops are on purely mechanical action, with a slider windchest). Manipulating stops while holding one or more notes (possible on most organs, but most effective if the stops are on purely mechanical action, with a slider chest).

=== Other instruments ===
- unusual harmonics
- glissandi, tuner glissando

== Notable composers ==
- George Antheil
- Béla Bartók
- Bruno Bartolozzi
- Luciano Berio
- Hector Berlioz
- Heinrich Ignaz Franz Biber
- François-Adrien Boieldieu
- William Bolcom
- Pierre Boulez
- Glenn Branca
- Benjamin Britten
- Leo Brouwer
- John Cage
- Elliott Carter
- Aaron Cassidy
- Rhys Chatham
- Ghenadie Ciobanu
- Henry Cowell
- George Crumb
- Nicolas-Marie Dalayrac
- Peter Maxwell Davies
- Stuart Dempster
- Pascal Dusapin
- John Eaton
- Robert Erickson
- Julio Estrada
- Carlo Farina
- Morton Feldman
- Brian Ferneyhough
- Carlo Forlivesi
- Sofia Gubaidulina
- Jonathan Harvey
- Hans Werner Henze
- Dick Higgins
- Gustav Holst
- Toshio Hosokawa
- Alan Hovhaness
- Tobias Hume
- Charles Ives
- Ben Johnston
- Garth Knox
- Panayiotis Kokoras
- Nikita Koshkin
- Sophie Lacaze
- Helmut Lachenmann
- György Ligeti
- Gustav Mahler
- Eric Mandat
- Joseph Maneri
- Michael Markowski
- Meredith Monk
- Ken Namba
- Luigi Nono
- Andrew Norman
- Pauline Oliveros
- Leo Ornstein
- Sean Osborn
- Owen Pallett
- Arvo Pärt
- Krzysztof Penderecki
- Gérard Pesson
- Sun Ra
- Lou Reed
- Doina Rotaru
- Christopher Rouse
- Kaija Saariaho
- Camille Saint-Saëns
- Giacinto Scelsi
- John Schneider
- Arnold Schoenberg
- Salvatore Sciarrino
- Stephen Scott
- Karlheinz Stockhausen
- Igor Stravinsky
- Toru Takemitsu
- Bertram Turetzky
- Ken Ueno
- Galina Ustvolskaya
- Franco Venturini
- Heitor Villa-Lobos
- Claude Vivier
- Carl Maria von Weber
- Jörg Widmann
- Iannis Xenakis
- La Monte Young
- Frank Zappa
- John Zorn

== Notable performers ==
=== Bass ===
- Bill Laswell
- Michael Manring
- Jaco Pastorius
- Mark Sandman
- Mike Silverman
- Bertram Turetzky

=== Bassoon ===
- Yusef Lateef

=== Cello ===
- Tom Cora
- Helen Liebmann
- Rohan de Saram
- Frances-Marie Uitti

=== Clarinet ===
- Tara Bouman
- Walter Boeykens
- Guy Deplus
- Roberto Paci Dalò
- Eric Dolphy
- Eric Mandat
- Sean Osborn
- Michel Portal
- William O. Smith
- Suzanne Stephens
- Jörg Widmann
- Evan Ziporyn

=== Drums and percussion ===
- Burkhard Beins
- Han Bennink
- John Bonham
- Bryan "Brain" Mantia
- Keith Moon
- Steve Noble
- Steven Schick
- Ruth Underwood

=== Flute ===
- Ian Anderson
- Pierre-Yves Artaud
- Ian Clarke
- Robert Dick
- Roberto Fabbriciani
- John Fonville
- Rahsaan Roland Kirk
- Kathinka Pasveer
- Maggi Payne
- Greg Pattillo

=== Guitar ===
- Ichirou Agata
- Cristian Amigo
- Derek Bailey
- Syd Barrett
- Adrian Belew
- Buckethead
- Herman Li
- Nels Cline
- Roland Dyens
- Dominic Frasca
- Fred Frith
- Synyster Gates
- Jonny Greenwood
- GP Hall
- Michael Hedges
- Jimi Hendrix
- Evan Hirschelman
- Martín Irigoyen
- Enver İzmaylov
- Jonsi
- Kaki King
- Uwe Kropinski
- Arto Lindsay
- Andy McKee
- Erik Mongrain
- Thurston Moore
- Tom Morello
- Jimmy Page
- Štěpán Rak
- Lee Ranaldo
- Preston Reed
- Marc Ribot
- Keith Rowe
- Joe Satriani
- Nigel Tufnel
- Steve Vai

=== Harp ===
- Carlos Salzedo
- Marianne Smit

=== Horn ===
- David Amram
- Hermann Baumann
- Anthony Halstead
- Giovanni Punto
- David Pyatt
- Barry Tuckwell

=== Oboe ===
- Heinz Holliger
- Yusef Lateef

=== Piano ===
- George Antheil
- Henry Cowell
- Richard Bunger Evans
- Alan Hovhaness
- Leo Ornstein
- David Tudor
- Galina Ustvolskaya
- Franco Venturini
- Claude Vivier

=== Saxophone ===
- Peter Brötzmann
- Ornette Coleman
- Mats Gustafsson
- Rahsaan Roland Kirk
- Sam Newsome
- Evan Parker
- Ned Rothenberg
- Skerik
- Colin Stetson
- John Zorn
- Pharoah Sanders
- Anthony Braxton
- John Coltrane

=== Trombone ===
- Stuart Dempster
- Vinko Globokar
- John Kenny
- George E. Lewis
- Christian Lindberg
- Paul Rutherford
- Mike Svoboda
- Abbie Conant

=== Tuba ===
- Øystein Baadsvik

=== Trumpet ===
- Miles Davis
- Jon Hassell
- Håkan Hardenberger
- Peter Evans

=== Viola ===
- John Cale
- Garth Knox
- Anne Lanzilotti
- Ysanne Spevack

=== Violin ===
- Alexander Balanescu
- Tony Conrad
- Graeme Jennings
- Niccolò Paganini
- Michael Urbaniak
- Paul Zukofsky

=== Voice ===
- Blixa Bargeld
- Cathy Berberian
- Jaap Blonk
- Brian Chippendale
- Collegium Vocale Köln
- George Fisher
- Diamanda Galás
- Peter Hammill
- Roy Hart
- Shelley Hirsch
- Joan La Barbara
- Bobby McFerrin
- Meredith Monk
- David Moss
- Sainkho Namtchylak
- Mike Patton
- Maja Ratkje
- Demetrio Stratos
- Tanya Tagaq
- Kazuki Tomokawa
- Ken Ueno
- Michael Vetter
- Trevor Wishart

=== Other ===
- Bradford Reed

== See also ==
- List of notable pieces which use extended techniques
