= Battalia =

Battalia may refer to:

- Battalia (formation), battle array for both an army and components of an army
- Battalia (moth), a genus of moths belonging to the subfamily Tortricinae of the family Tortricidae

== See also ==
- Battalia à 10 (1673), a musical piece composed by Heinrich Ignaz Franz von Biber (see List of musical pieces which use extended techniques and Stylus fantasticus)
- La Bataille or La Guerre (1529), a musical piece composed by Janequin to commemorate the Battle of Marignano in 1515 (see Battaglia (music))
