= Roulette Intermedium =

Performing arts and music venue in New York City

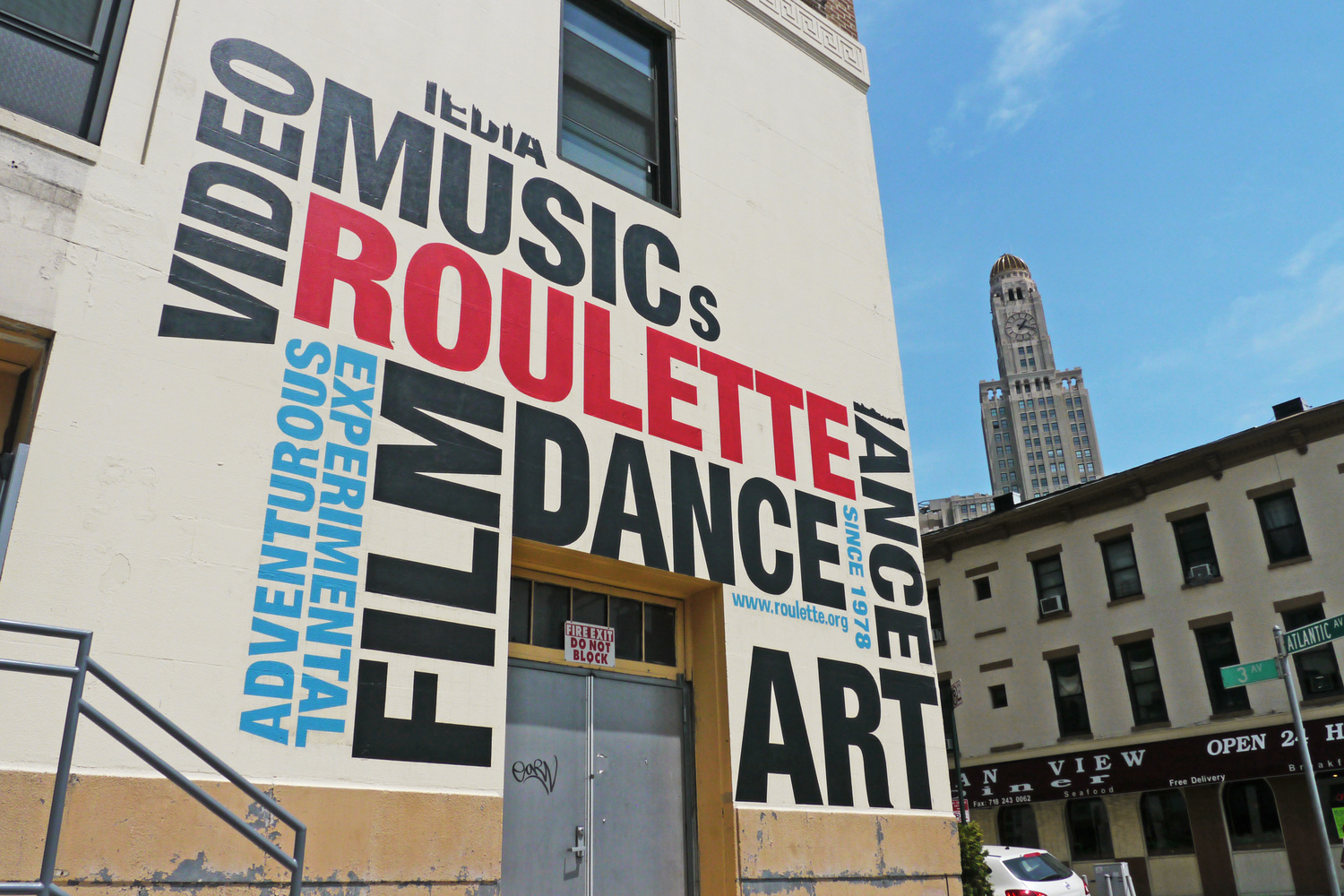
- The Street view of Roulette Intermedium, Brooklyn
- Address: 509 Atlantic Avenue (at the corner of 3rd Avenue); Brooklyn, NY; United States
- Owner: YWCA of Brooklyn
- Capacity: 400
- Type: Performing arts center
- Public transit: Long Island Rail Road: Atlantic Terminal Atlantic Branch; New York City Subway: Atlantic Avenue–Barclays Center; MTA Regional Bus Operations: B37, B41, B45, B63, B65, B67, B103

Construction
- Opened: 1928
- Rebuilt: 2011
- Architects: Frederick Lee Ackerman and Alexander B. Trowbridge. Renovation by Warren Freyer

Website
- www.roulette.org

Roulette Intermedium is a performing arts and new music venue located in Brooklyn, New York City. Founded in 1978, it has been located in the neighborhoods of Tribeca and SoHo in Manhattan, and now resides in a renovated theater in downtown Brooklyn. Roulette is a nonprofit organization focusing on fostering experimental dance, new music, and performance.

== History ==
=== Origins ===
Roulette Intermedium Inc. was founded in 1978 by trombonist Jim Staley, sound-artists David Weinstein and Dan Senn, and graphic artist Laurie Szujewska as an artists' space for the presentation of music, dance and intermedia. Named in honor of Weinstein's piece Café Roulette —"an homage to Dada and to chance operations in music" — and housed in Staley's TriBeCa loft, Roulette was a product of the burgeoning Downtown Music scene and produced between 50 and 90 concerts a year.

The range is broad, with a strong focus on new jazz and contemporary music works, improvised collaborations, and one-time special events. Under-30 composers are as likely to be heard as such major downtown figures (and Board members) as John Zorn or William Parker.

Founder Staley put it this way:

The whole aesthetic and direction was founded on the two Johns: John Coltrane and John Cage. ... I've always felt that if you're talking about the American avant-garde, don't just talk about Cage or the Downtown minimalist scene; you have to talk about the avant-jazz scene, too. There's just as extensive a scene going on in jazz as there is in the new music, classical, electronics world. So that's always been an essential part of our programming.

According to Downtown Music IV: Loft Jazz, Roulette emerged as "one of the most important venues for improvised music" during the late 1970s into the 1980s. In 1985, Roulette presented "a festival of improvisers that included most of the important musicians on the scene."

=== Changing spaces ===
In 1997, a French restaurant moved in "downstairs and the music blasting from the club was louder than the concert." Staley added, "That was the beginning of the end." While the organization stayed in place for a few more years, by 2003, changes in NYC loft law compelled Roulette to seek out new performance venue options. Over the next three years, Roulette presented at a number of locations around the city including at The Flea, The Performing Garage, Symphony Space and at Location One, a storefront space in SoHo located at 20 Greene Street.

By 2006, Roulette had begun performing regularly at Location One, but the search for a more accommodating space continued. Then in 2010, Roulette found a new home.

=== Downtown Brooklyn facility ===
In August 2010, Roulette signed a 20-year lease on a 7,000-square-foot Art Deco concert hall at Atlantic and Third Avenues in downtown Brooklyn, a few blocks from the Brooklyn Academy of Music.

The space in Downtown Brooklyn is part of the historic YWCA that was built in 1928 and designed by Frederick Lee Ackerman and Alexander B. Trowbridge. The building was designed as a multi-use facility, and originally included 214 units of low-income housing for women, a theater, a pool, health, and community services. It was also the first YWCA to racially integrate its residences and programs.

The venue served as a popular concert venue for orchestral, chamber and choral groups, as well as a major Brooklyn community center. Brooklynites came to Memorial Hall for the highly popular USO dances during World War II, the organizing rallies of the Brooklyn Civil Rights Movement, including early meetings of the Black Panthers, protests during the Vietnam War, meetings of Women's Rights organizations in the '70s, and a Peace Conference in the '80s. It was a regular focal point for various community groups and social service, preservation and education organizations.

By the 1990s, building had fallen into disrepair. A CVF grant in 2009 funded a conditions report by the firm of Cutsogeorge Tooman & Allen Architects (CTA) on water penetration at the top level of the property. Water damage had rendered several top floor living units uninhabitable. The assessment included cost estimates of repairs to the masonry and parapets of this large property in the range of $1.3 to $1.7 million.

By 2010, the YWCA had raised the money and completed a major renovation of a majority of the eleven-story building. The theater, however, was left in disrepair.

On September 15, 2011, Roulette opened for business. The renovated space featured two levels of seating for up to 400 people (600 standing), an expanded multi-channel sound system, projection screen for film and multi-media events, state-of-the-art lighting system, modular stage, and a specially designed floor to accommodate dance. A review of the new venue in The New York Times said, "the new space has a cool allure, with Art Deco details refurbished in elegant gray and silver, and balconies that surround the spacious floor seating on three sides." Roulette celebrated the opening with a four-evening opening series, featuring Lou Reed, Laurie Anderson, John Zorn, Finnish composer Kaija Saariaho and 2016 Pulitzer Prize-winner Henry Threadgill. The opening was hailed as a move that "some hope will re-energize an effort to build a cultural district around the academy in downtown Brooklyn."

== Roulette TV and Archive ==
According to Staley, Roulette TV (RTV) was conceived in 1999 as a way to extend the concerts/ artists' work beyond the live performance. It features network broadcast and online videos that capture the creative process of live performance with interviews with the artists, giving people worldwide the opportunity to experience Roulette's programs, both as an audience member and behind-the-scenes. The first iteration was a performance/interview with Christian Marclay, produced in collaboration with DCTV; it originally aired in early 2000.

The RTV collection contains more than 100 programs that highlight a wide range of experimental musicians, composers, and Intermedia artists.

Each episode focuses on an artists' work, featuring interviews and video clips from their Roulette performance. These programs include luminaries of the avant-garde as well as lesser-known and emerging artists such as Frankie Mann, Darius Jones, Mary Halvorson, C. Spencer Yeh, Molly Lieber, and Eleanor Smith.

RTV can be seen on Manhattan and Brooklyn cable television networks, on Roulette's website, and on Vimeo and YouTube channels.

The Roulette Concert Archive documents over 3,000 events produced by Roulette and includes audio recordings, video, posters and ephemera, and photos of these in a searchable database at roulette.org/archive.

== Founder: Jim Staley ==
Staley studied trombone at the University of Illinois with Bob Gray. He was drafted for the Vietnam War soon after graduating and spent three years playing in military bands during his service in the U.S. Army. "Staley was inspired by the collectivist, envelope-pushing spirit of the German avant-garde music scene, which he experienced first-hand while stationed in Berlin from 1971 to 1973." While in Berlin, he also met with Slide Hampton, and "got to meet a lot of the composers and artists that were involved in the DAAD (Deutsche Akademischer Austausch Dienst (e.g., the German Academic Exchange Service))."

In 1978, he moved to New York and founded Roulette.

He received the 2005 Susan E. Kennedy Memorial Award and the 2012 ASCAP award for his years in support of artists.

=== Discography ===
- The Ragdale Years (Einstein Records 012, 2000), Tone Road Ramblers
- Morgan Powell: On and Off the Score (Upper Hand Press, 2015) Tone Road Ramblers (Morgan Powell, Ray Sasaki, Eric Mandat, John Fonville, Ron Coulter)
- Don Giovanni (Einstein Records, 1992)
- Mumbo Jumbo (Einstein Records, 1994) with John Zorn, Bill Frisell, and Elliott Sharp.
- Northern Dancers (Einstein Records, 1996) with John Zorn, and Zeena Parkins.
- Blind Pursuits (Einstein Records, 1997)
- Scattered Thoughts (Einstein Records, 2010) with Joey Baron and William Parker.

== Einstein Records ==
In 1991, Staley founded Einstein Records. The label sought "to produce, distribute and promote its adventurous artists worldwide in the same way that Roulette has served the New York audience." Frequent collaborators included John Zorn, Ikue Mori, Zeena Parkins, Elliott Sharp, and Shelley Hirsch; as well as his cohorts Morgan Powell, Michael Kowalski and others from a collective known as the Tone Road Ramblers.
