= Suite for Microtonal Piano =

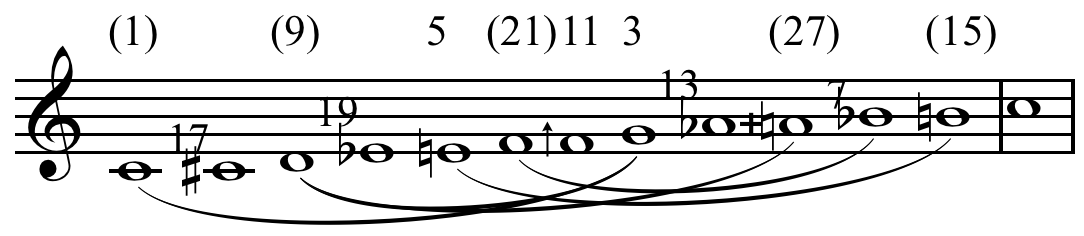
Suite for Microtonal Piano microtonal tuning arranged in a chromatic scale. Harmonics indicated by notation or above the staff, just perfect fifths marked with slurs.

Suite for Microtonal Piano (1978) is a suite for specifically microtonally tuned piano(s) by Ben Johnston written in 1977 (see also just intonation). According to Bob Gilmore the piece "take[s] extended just intonation well beyond the point reached by Harry Partch."

"The piano is tuned to a selection of overtones from the fifth octave of the harmonic spectrum of C. All octaves are tuned in the same scale....The lowest C (33 Hz.) can be used to tune the scale by ear. In succession, touch the nodes producing the 3rd, 5th, 7th, 11th, 13th, 17th, [and] 19th partials. Then G, D; D, A; E, B; [and] B-flat, F; are just (beatless) fifths."

== Movements ==
1. Alarum
2. Blues
3. Etude
4. Song
5. Toccata

Alarum is a Shakespeare era stage direction indicating "a grand entrance" and an archaic word for a call to arms, so "Alarum" is a fanfare.

"Blues" and "Song" are both slow movements. "Blues" uses as blue notes the minor seventh (C-B♭) and mediant (in D dorian exactly halfway between E and G). "Song" is in E phrygian.

"Etude" is a study in serial technique and six-against-five polyrhythms in which Johnston indicates "blur with pedal". This, "clues us in that the linear intricacies are only part of the story here: the amazing swirl of overtones resulting from an atonal application of this tuning are of equal importance."

"Toccata" features diatonic outer sections and a spikier chromatic middle section.

The piece has been recorded and released on:

- Microtonal Piano by Ben Johnston (1997). Phillip Bush, piano. Koch International Classics 3-7369-2.
