= Sean Osborn =

American clarinetist (born 1966)

Sean Osborn (born 1966) is a former clarinetist of the Metropolitan Opera Orchestra and a regular substitute in the clarinet section of the Seattle Symphony Orchestra. He has been a student of Stanley Hasty, Frank Kowalsky, and Eric Mandat.

== Clarinetist ==
Winner of The American Prize in instrumental performance for 2017–18, Sean Osborn has traveled the world as soloist and chamber musician, and during his 11 years with the Metropolitan Opera. He has also performed as guest principal clarinet with the New York Philharmonic, Pittsburgh Symphony, Seattle Symphony, and the American Symphony Orchestra. He has over 40 concertos in his repertoire, and extensive chamber music experience. A new music specialist, he has premiered over 100 works, including those of Philip Glass, John Corigliano, Chen Yi, Chinary Ung, Eric Mandat, and others. He appears on over 50 CDs with the Metropolitan Opera, New York Philharmonic, Seattle Symphony, and several chamber music groups. He has multiple solo CD releases on Albany Records, including Cyrille Rose 32 Etudes, Sean Osborn plays Mozart, Bits and Pieces and American Spirit. He has also appeared on nearly 100 Film and Video game soundtrack recordings, including About Schmidt, Wedding Crashers, Animatrix, Call of Duty 3, and Windows XP.

== Composer ==
Osborn is a composer, whose works have been performed around the world by groups such as the London Philharmonic Orchestra, the Toledo Clarinets, and members of the orchestras of Los Angeles, Detroit, Boston, New York, and others. Many of his compositions are available on his website for free download.

=== Selected Compositions ===
- Symphony No. 1 "September 11th"
- Symphony No. 2 (for Band)
- Concerto for Chamber Orchestra
- Trumpet Concerto
- Trombone Concerto
- Oboe Concerto
- Serenade for Woodwinds (an updated companion to Mozart's Gran Partita)
- Violin Sonata
- Quintet for Clarinet and Strings, "The Beatles"
- Quintet No. 1 for Clarinet and Strings
- Lyric Pieces for Violin, Clarinet, 'Cello, and Piano
- Two Reed Trios
- Sonata for E-flat Clarinet and Piano
- The Machine, for Wind Quintet
- Bulldog March (for Band)
- Fantasy on "Lo, How a Rose e'er Blooming" (for Band)
- Several pieces for clarinet solo, duo, trio, and quartet
- Several pieces for various combinations of woodwinds
- Several small pieces for piano solo

=== Orchestrations/Arrangements ===
- Preludes, Book 1. by Claude Debussy for Orchestra
- Suite of Music by William Byrd, for clarinet quartet
- smaller pieces and Christmas songs for clarinet quartet or Wind Quintet
- pieces by Grieg, Bach, Faure and others for Wind Quintet

== Educator ==
From 2006 to 2009 Osborn was on the faculty of the University of Washington, where he taught clarinet lessons, reedmaking, and clarinet techniques. He was also on the faculty of the Cornish College of the Arts. He has presented scores of master classes throughout North America at the Eastman School of Music, Northwestern University, Rice University, Manhattan School of Music, and many other schools, as well as in Japan and Slovenia. During the summer, he coaches chamber groups at the Vivace! chamber music camp at Seattle Pacific University. He is also the founder and director of the free, educationally-based Clarinettissimo clarinet festival, held every October.

His extensive website has much educational content, including a large series of videos and essays on playing orchestral excerpts, and other essays, including those published in The Clarinet. Additional videos on his YouTube page cover extended techniques and how to teach the clarinet.

== Namesakes ==
Clarinetist Sean Osborn shouldn't be confused with Irish rower Seán Osborne.
