= Sonata for Microtonal Piano (Ben Johnston) =

Sonata for Microtonal Piano is a sonata for specifically microtonally tuned piano by Ben Johnston written in 1964 (see also just intonation). When the movements are played in an alternate order the piece is titled Grindlemusic.

The piece uses, "chains of just tuned (untempered) triadic intervals over the whole piano range," with very few, only seven, piano keys having octave equivalents, thus providing eighty-one different pitches (there are eighty-eight white and black keys total). "Effectively, for the listener, there are three main gradations of consonance/dissonance: (1) smooth untempered [ major and minor] thirds and fifths, which have the least harshness caused by acoustical beats; (2) compounds of these...; and (3) chromatic or enharmonic intervals...which sound 'out of tune.'" [note the difference between 'keyboard distance' in this tuning and pitch or interval distance: for example a fifteenth, two keys with fifteen notes between them, on a normally tuned keyboard is a double octave, while in this tuning a fifteenth is slightly sharper than that]

"This suggested...the possibility of two opposite systems for the deployment of pitches: one that synchronized pitch choices with the layout of consonant and dissonant intervals on the keyboard [see: tonality], and a violently contrasting one in which the system for choosing pitches, a twelve-tone-row procedure derived largely from certain practices of Berg and late Schoenberg [see: twelve-tone technique], either ignores or flaunts the consonance/dissonance keyboard layout [see: atonality]. There are two contrasting movements of each of these types."

"This makes possible a Janus[two]-faced work, in which, with only the third movement similarly located in both versions, permutations of the placement of the other three movements creates an alter-ego relationship between the two versions, called respectively Sonata for Microtonal Piano and Grindlemusic. In the Sonata version, the movements correspond to the classical sonata scheme: the 'sonata-allegro,' the 'scherzo,' the songlike 'slow movement,' and the 'finale,' which is in this case a meditative adagio. All movements, however are cast in the common ballad mold, AABA, as is each of the two entire versions, the Sonata and Grindlemusic."

In the words of the composer:

"The Sonata, whether presented as beauty or as the beast, is a monstrous parody-enigma, allusive, referential, sometimes derisive, distorted, a tissue of familiarity in radically strange garb....Whatever the closing mood brings to mind, it is overlaid with irony and derision. The Sonata sequence poses the challenge: fast, faster, slow, slower. When, in the Sonata's finale, the knots are finally untied, will it be clear from what Houdini has escaped?"

"All tempos, all phrase and section lengths, and in certain parts of the 'finale' (which opens Grindlemusic, the sequence closing with the 'scherzo'), even note-to-note timings conform to a proportional scheme derived from a single pattern of changes in AABA form. This pattern is associated with two distinct motivic groups at different points in the work."

The piece has been recorded and released on:

- Microtonal Piano by Ben Johnston (1997). Phillip Bush, piano. Koch International Classics 3-7369-2.

"Though the piece was recorded as the Sonata, and though Johnston and I both agree that a live performance of Grindlemusic would contain subtle alterations, the metric modulations between movements are nevertheless worked out to arrive at identical tempos in each version. Therefore I feel that a passable sense of Grindlemusic can be experienced by simply reprogramming the tracks on your compact disc player. To program the tracks for Grindlemusic, select the track order 9, 6, 8, 7." The Sonata being track order 6, 7, 8, 9. 8, being B, stays in the same place.

== Movements ==
=== Sonata for Microtonal Piano ===
1. Sonata-allegro
2. Scherzo
3. Slow movement
4. Finale

=== Grindlemusic ===
1. Premises
2. Questions
3. Soul Music
4. Mood Music

Sonata-allegro = Questions, Scherzo = Mood Music, Slow movement = Soul Music, Finale = Premises.
