= John Fonville =

John Fonville is a flutist and composer. Fonville specializes in extended techniques on the flute, especially microtonality, and performs on instruments including a complete set of quarter tone (Kingma system) flutes. He has premiered works by composers including Ben Johnston, Salvatore Martirano, Joji Yuasa, Roger Reynolds, Hiroyuki Itoh, and Paul Koonce.

He is a member of the Tone Road Ramblers (Morgan Powell, Ray Sasaki, Eric Mandat, Jim Staley, Ron Coulter), the Eolus Quintet, and the UCSD Department of Music's Performance Lab. Fonville is the author of Microtonal Fingerings for Flute (1987), A Pedagogical Approach to the Flute Etudes of Joachim Andersen (1981), and "Ben Johnston's Extended Just Intonation: A Guide for Interpreters" (1991).

Fonville is the flute player, and is listed as such, on the recording credits for the theme song of the 1971 film Shaft, recorded by Isaac Hayes in 1971.

AllMusic's François Couture describes Fonville as, "one of the strongest contemporary flutists."
