= Battalia oligosta =

Scientific classification
- Kingdom: Animalia
- Phylum: Arthropoda
- Class: Insecta
- Order: Lepidoptera
- Family: Tortricidae
- Genus: Battalia
- Species: B. oligosta

Binomial name
- Battalia oligosta (Diakonoff, 1952)

Synonyms
- Parachorista oligosta Diakonoff, 1952

Species of moth

Battalia oligosta is a species of moth of the family Tortricidae. It is found in New Guinea.
