= Heidi Von Gunden =

American musicologist

Heidi C. Von Gunden is a musicologist and associate professor of Composition-Theory at the University of Illinois Urbana-Champaign. She has written books on the music of Ben Johnston, Pauline Oliveros, Lou Harrison, and Vivian Fine. The books about Johnston's and Harrison's music are detailed studies about the composers' use of just intonation, and the books about Oliveros and Fine contain analyses of their music and examine the issues of women composers. In addition, Von Gunden has published several compositions and contributed theoretical writings and analyses to the College Music Symposium, Neuland, Perspectives of New Music, and the International League of Women Composers Journal.
