= Battalia fusca =

Scientific classification
- Kingdom: Animalia
- Phylum: Arthropoda
- Class: Insecta
- Order: Lepidoptera
- Family: Tortricidae
- Genus: Battalia
- Species: B. fusca

Binomial name
- Battalia fusca (Diakonoff, 1953)

Synonyms
- Parachorista fusca Diakonoff, 1953

Species of moth

Battalia fusca is a species of moth of the family Tortricidae. It is found in New Guinea, where it has been recorded from Papua.
