= Franco Venturini (musician) =

Italian composer and pianist (born 1977)

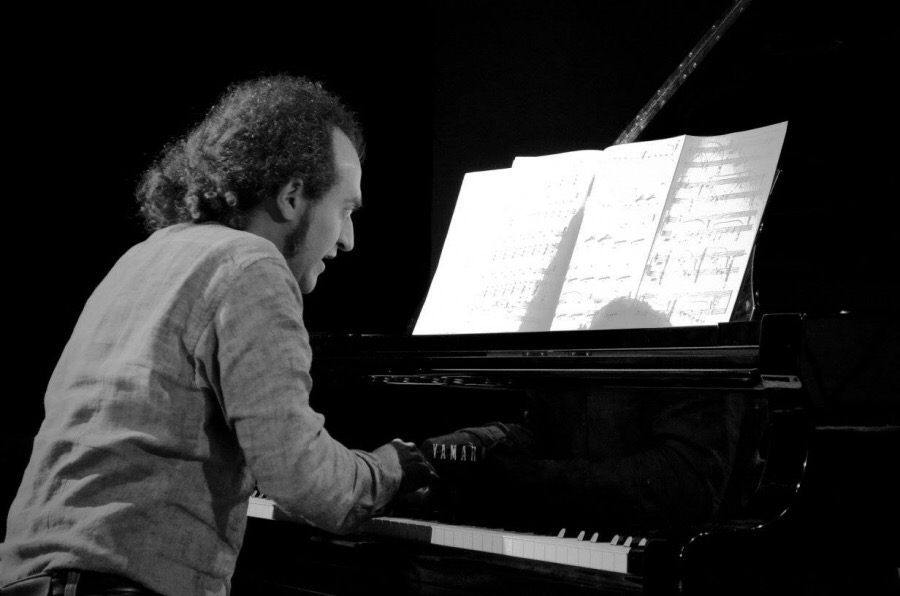
- Venturini playing piano
- Born: August 2, 1977 (age 48); Forlimpopoli, Italy
- Occupations: pianist; composer; music teacher
- Years active: 1995–present

Franco Venturini (born August 2, 1977 in Forlimpopoli, Forlì) is an Italian musician based in Paris. From the earliest age he demonstrated an uncommon attitude towards classical music, which led him to pursue a musical career. He started as a pianist, later devoting himself to composition mainly in the fields of contemporary classical music and electronic music.

== Biography and career ==
=== Training ===
Venturini graduated in piano with honors from the "B. Maderna" Conservatory of Cesena; later he obtained his diploma in composition with the highest marks at the Conservatorio G. B. Martini in Bologna; the diploma in electronic music with honors at the G. B. Martini Conservatory of Bologna; the diploma of the composition course with Ivan Fedele at the Accademia Nazionale di Santa Cecilia; 2nd level master in music composition, theory and research at the University of Paris VIII with a thesis on "Extended techniques" in the piano and in the contemporary piano repertoire; merit diplomas at the Master Classes of Michele Campanella and the "Trio di Trieste" at the Accademia Chigiana; and certificate of merit from the International Chamber Music School of the Trio di Trieste in Duino.

==== Masterclasses ====
Master Class of piano and chamber music with:

- Michele Campanella, Accademia Musicale Chigiana, Siena, 2000–2006.
- Oxana Yablonskaya, International Master Class of Piano, Ravenna, 2000;
- Sergio Perticaroli, International Master Classes at Villa Medici-Giulini, Milan, 1999;
- Pier Narciso Masi, in Piobbico (Pesaro), 1998; International summer courses – "Festival sinfonico delle Dolomiti", Belluno, 1999; at the Musical Association "A. Corelli ", Fusignano, 1999;
- Francesco La Licata, Atelier of chamber music of the XX century, Republic of San Marino, 2002;
- "Trio di Trieste", Accademia Musicale Chigiana, Siena, 2004 and 2005; International Chamber Music School of Trio di Trieste, Duino, 2004–2006.

Master Classes/Composition Seminars with:

- Beat Furrer, De Musica – Nuova Consonanza, Rome, 2011;
- Philippe Hurel, Unsuk Chin, Oscar Strasnoy, ateliers of the Center Acanthes, Metz (France), 2011;
- Tristan Murail, Hans Peter Kyburz, Beat Furrer, ateliers of the Center Acanthes, Metz (France), 2010;
- Brian Ferneyhough, Wolfgang Rihm, Marco Stroppa 44th Internationale Ferienkurse für Neue Musik, Darmstadt, 2008;
- Eduard Brunner, Master Class for composers Traiettorie '07, Parma, 2007;
- Sylvano Bussotti, Alessandro Solbiati, Nicola Sani, at the Musical Institute "A. Peri", Reggio Emilia, 2002.

=== Artistic activity ===
Franco Venturini is actively involved in composition. His works have been presented at Biennale Musica, Venice; Theater La Fenice in Venice; Angelica Festival, Bologna; Milan Music Festival; MITO Festival, Milan; Festival Traiettorie, Parma; Musikprotokoll Festival, Graz; Pharos Arts Foundation, Cyprus; Radio Suisse Romande, Geneva; Parco della Musica, Rome; Istituto Cervantés, Paris; Musica para el tercer milenio, Madrid; Festival Mixtur, Barcelona; Nanyang Academy of Fine Arts, Singapore; and Central Conservatory of Music, Beijing.

Among the performers of his music are Proxima Centauri ensemble, Klangforum Wien, Trío Arbós, Prometheus Quartet, Das Neue Ensemble of Hannover, Quartet New Generation in Berlin, Imaginaire in Strasbourg, Italian ensembles Divertimento, Icarus, Ex novo and FontanaMIX, Orchestre National de Lorraine.

He has received commissions from Venice Biennale Musica, Arena di Verona Foundation, Milan EXPO, Parma Traiettorie Festival, Ensemble Imaginaire of Strasbourg, Ex Novo, FontanaMIX, Icarus. He took part in the PRIME project (Paetzold Recorder Investigation for Music with Electronics) of the Lausanne Conservatory. He benefited from an artistic residency at the Istituto Italiano di Cultura in Paris.

As a pianist, Venturini is particularly interested in interpreting the contemporary repertoire, both as a soloist and in various ensembles (FontanaMIX, Icarus, Soundinitiative, Accroche Note). He has collaborated with internationally renowned artists such as N. Isherwood, G. Knox, Matthias Pintscher, Stefano Gervasoni, Alessandro Solbiati, N. de Paz, A. Damiens, Giorgio Zagnoni, L. Pfaff and the choreographer Luca Veggetti for the Festival Angelica in Bologna.

He has given concerts in various festivals, including Biennale Musica di Venezia; Ravello Concert Society; Accademia Filarmonica di Bologna; Accademia Musicale Chigiana (Siena); Bologna Festival; APERTO Festival (Reggio Emilia); Trieste Prima; New Music Festival of the Teatro Massimo di Palermo; Nuova Consonanza (Rome); Auditorium Parco della Musica (Rome); Levi Foundation (Venice); ETNEA Association (Catania); Teatro Comunale di Bologna; Teatro Verdi (Pisa); and Teatro Politeama, Palermo.

Internationally he performed in France (Salle Cortot, Paris; Théâtre Adyar, Paris; Manifeste IRCAM, Paris; Matinées du piano, Orléans; Festival International de Wissembourg; Festival Sons d'automne, Annecy; Centre Pompidou, Les Moments Musicaux de Chalosse, Italian Cultural Institutes of Paris and Strasbourg), in Spain (Museo Nacional Centro de Arte Reina Sofía, Madrid; Mixtur Festival, Barcelona), in Austria (Schönberg Center, Vienna; Bludenzer Tage zeitgemasser Musik), in Croatia (Biennial of Zagreb), in Slovenia (Slowind Festival, Ljubljana), in Sweden (Connect Festival, Malmö).

He toured in New Zealand and Australia with the Parisian Soundinitiative ensemble, giving concerts at the Bendigo International Festival of Exploratory Music, at the Brisbane Festival, at the Yong Siew Toh Conservatory of Music in Singapore.

His performances and compositions have been broadcast on various radio stations (Radio France Musique, Radio Österreich 1, RaiRadio3). He has made several premieres and recordings. He has held conferences-concerts and seminars on contemporary piano music in conservatories and universities (Rome Tre, University of Burgundy, University of Paris VIII, Conservatoire à Rayonnement Régional de Paris).

=== Compositions ===
Partial list of compositions:

- Arachne (2014) for flute in G
- Beati pauperes spiritu (2012) for 2 violins, viola, cello
- Dàimones (2013) for violin, cello, piano, Duration: 15'00
- Pensées sur la mort (2011) for flute, saxophone, piano
- Progetto-Dante (2012), Musical journey in 12 stations on the Divine Comedy: INFERNO, descent – PURGATORY, ascent and Beatitudes – PARADISO, song and three studies on light for 2 violins, viola, cello, Duration: 60'00
- Sur l'aile du tourbillon intelligent (2010) for piano

=== Audio-video recordings ===
- DVD Beethoven & Risonanze with Innen – M. G. Bellocchio, piano – S. Fedele Foundation.
- DVD Dante with Beati pauperes spiritu, beati misericordes – Prometeo Quartet – S. Fedele Foundation.
- DVD Unirsi al cielo with Metallomorfosi – Klangforum Wien – S. Fedele Foundation.
- CD with Sur l'aile du tourbillon intelligent – Franco Venturini, piano – Associazione G.E.R.M.I. Rome.

=== Awards ===
- 2nd award (1st not assigned), Modern recorder project – Composition Competition – Musikinstitut Darmstadt.
- Prix Albert Roussel and Prix SACEM, 8ème Concours International de piano d’Orléans.
- 2nd prize, 15th Trío di Trieste Award – Giampaolo Coral award – International Composition Competition
- 3rd prize, Leibniz' Harmonien – Internationaler Kompositionswettbewerb – Hannover.
- 1st prize, Call for Scores GERMI 2010, MusicaL Association G.E.R.M.I. – Rome.
- Honorable mention, 2009 Farnesina Sound Award for composers, CEMAT – Rome.
- Selected for the 9th forum de la jeune création musicale, S.I.M.C. – Paris.
- 3 "Felice and Luigi Magone" awards, Composition – Conservatory of Bologna category.
- 5th Review of Best Italian Graduates, CD registration of the winners.

=== Educational activities ===
- Piano, theory and solfeggio – music school «C. Confetta », Reggio Emilia, 2007–2008
- Study of the score – School of the Italian Opera of the Teatro Comunale di Bologna, 2009–2010
- Analysis of the repertoire for strings – Conservatorio "G. B. Martini" in Bologna, 2011–2012
- Theory, Analysis, Composition – "C. Sigonio" state musical high school, Modena, 2016–2017
- Executive practice of the contemporary repertoire – Conservatorio " G. B. Martini ", Bologna, 2017–2018 – 2018–2019
- Techniques of impromptu reading – Conservatory of Bologna, A.A. 2018/2019.

==== Pedagogical projects ====
Venturini has created educational projects with the Parisian ensemble Soundinitiative of which he is a member, aimed at raising awareness of the practice of improvisation, group interaction and the use of information technology:

- On improvisation – Saint-Gratien, Val-d'Oise (Île de France), 2016
- On registration and composition by computer media – Saint-Gratien, 2017
- On ensemble music – Conservatory of Étampes (Île de France), 2018
- On improvisation and interaction with the video image and electronic media, at conservatories in Val-d'Oise and in Essonne (Île de France), 2018–2019.

=== Others activities ===
He has also been an accompanying pianist and substitute schoolmaster for the Arturo Toscanini Foundation of Parma, the Orchestra Luigi Cherubini founded by Riccardo Muti, singing courses held by E. Dara, P. Coni and C. Forte for the Teatro Comunale di Piacenza.

== Sources ==
- "Franco Venturini". Cidim – Comitato Nazionale Italiano Musica. January 24, 2011.
- "Concerto di musica contemporanea del M° Franco Venturini". Ministero degli Affari Esteri e della Cooperazione Internazionale. February 1, 2013.
- "Franco Venturini – Biography". Issuu Inc. January 30, 2017.
- "Dialoghi sul comporre: new music through composing conversations". Bologna Città della Musica UNESCO. December 24, 2014.
