= Štěpán Rak =

Czech classical guitarist and composer

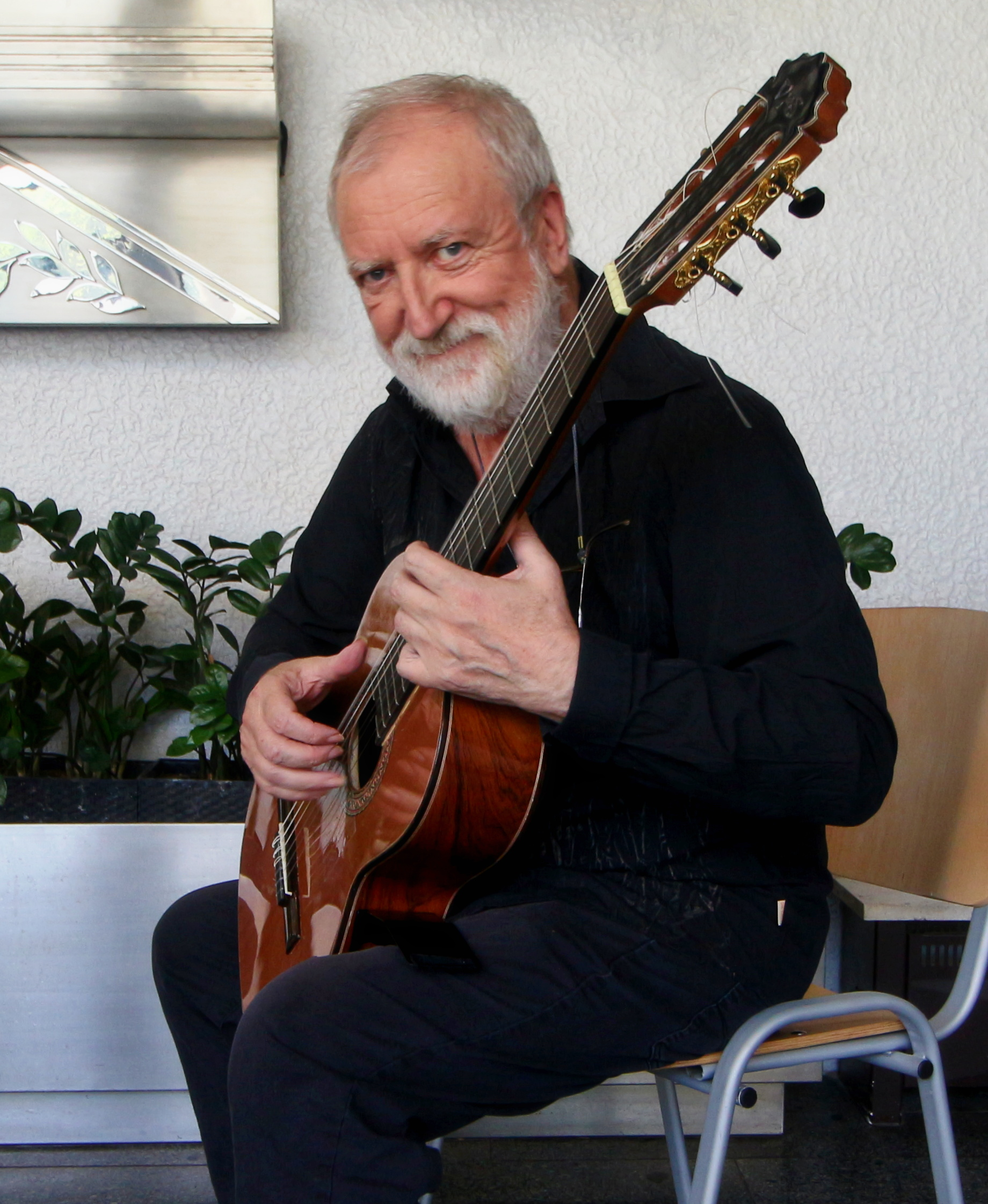
Štěpán Rak in 2019.

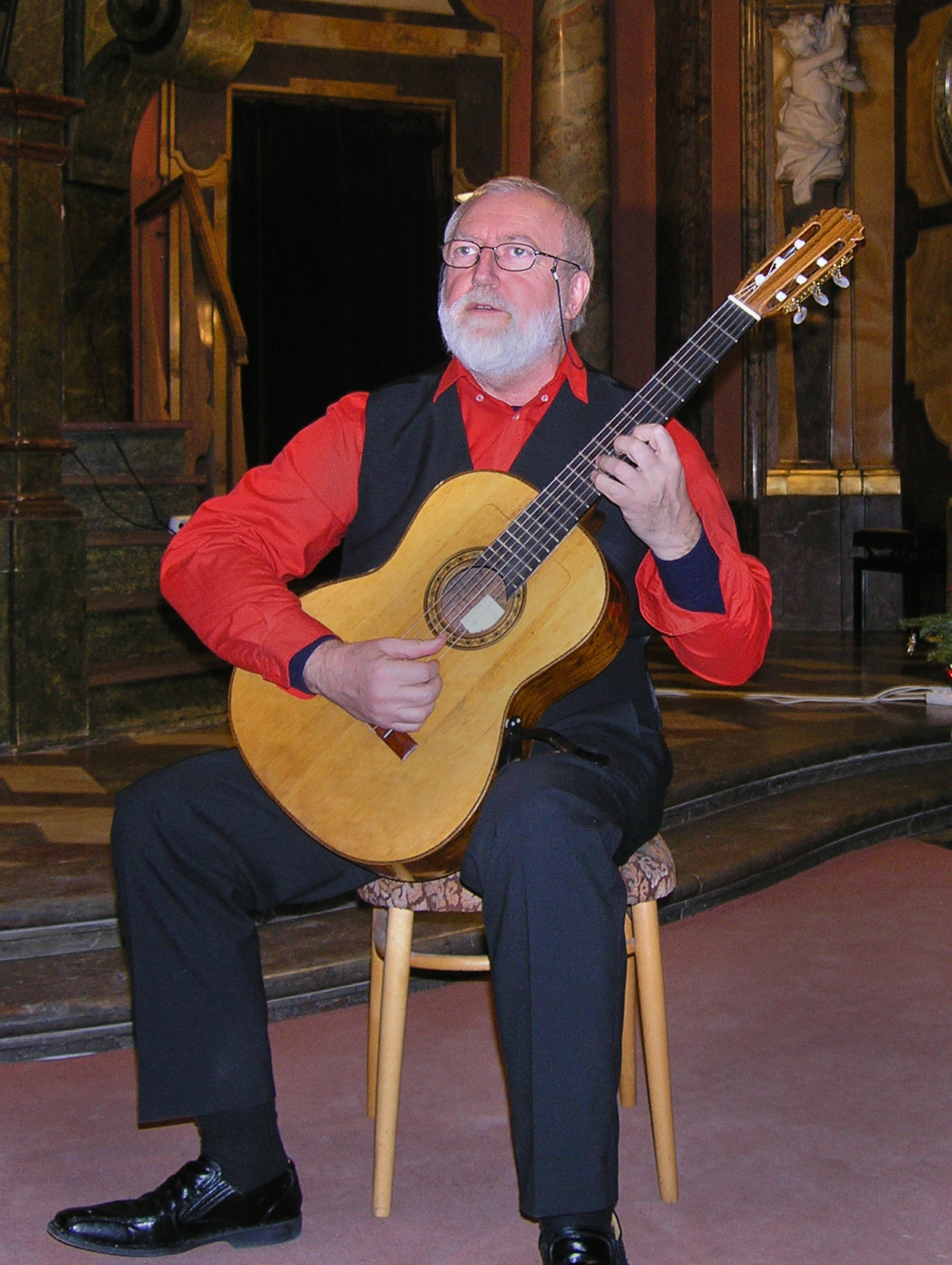
Štěpán Rak in 2009.

Štěpán Rak (born 8 August 1945) is a Czech classical guitarist and composer of Ukrainian origin. He is well known for the technical innovations that he uses in his compositions.

== Biography ==
Štěpán Rak was born as Štěpán Slivka in Prague to Cilja (Vasilina) Slivka (1924-1993). His mother escaped from Carpathian Ruthenia in 1941 after it was occupied by Hungary. She was imprisoned in USSR and joined Czechoslovak Army in 1944. Štěpán was adopted by Marie and Josef Rak in 1946 and his biological mother later returned to Ukraine. Rak first studied at a Fine Arts High School in Prague and continued with guitar studies at the Prague Conservatory until 1970. Later he studied composition at the Prague Academy of Arts. In 1973, his orchestral composition Hiroshima won a second prize at a Czechoslovak competition for young composers. From 1975 to 1980 he taught guitar at the Jyväskylä Conservatory in Finland. After his return to Czechoslovakia he taught at Prague Conservatory. Since 1982 he has been teaching guitar at Academy of Performing Arts in Prague. Rak speaks English, Russian, Finnish and German.

== Compositions ==
=== Solo Guitar ===
- Sonata per chitarra No. 1 (op. 1, No. 1)
- Sonata per chitarra No. 2 (op. 1, No. 2)
- Variation on theme by Jaromír Klempíř (op. 7)
- Toccata (op. 9, No. 2)
- Pláč kytary, in memoriam of F. G. Lorca (op. 11, No. 6)
- Hora - Romanian dance (op. 11, No. 9)
- Danza Mauretana (op. 11, No. 10)
- Slunce (op. 15)
- Andante, Vzpomínka na léto
- Hiroshima (op. 16a)
- Small nocturno (op. 18)
- Suite for guitar (op. 23)
- Partita semplice (op. 24)
- Finská pověst (op. 28)
- Český chorál (op. 29)
- Sbohem Finsko (op. 30)
- Romance (op. 34)
- Homanaje á Tárrega (op. 35)
- Renaissance suite (Pavana, Saltarello, Renesanční pokušení) (op. 31)
- Suite-etude (Bagatella, Palečkův pláč, Palečkův smích) (op. 33)
- Decem. partita per chitara No. 2 (op. 41)
- Rozmary (op. 42)
- Poslední diskotéka (op. 44)
- Variation on theme by Nikita Koshkin (op. 45)
- První láska (op. 52)
- Vzpomínka na Prahu (op. 36)
- Voces de profundis (op. 56)
- Five Concert Etudes (op. 57)
- Minutová sóla (op. 58)

=== Orchestra ===
- Vodní znamení (Concerto for guitar and orchestra) (op. 12)
- Hiroshima (Two movements for orchestra) (op. 16)
- Český sen (Ricercar pro velý dechový orchestr, varhany a bicí nástroje) (op. 21)
- Concerto for guitar and orchestra in C-major (op. 26)
- Rennaisance concerto for marimba, string orchestra and tympani (op. 60)
- Comenius (Concerto for guitar and orchestra) (op. 60a)

== Selected discography ==
- Remembering Prague (1988)
- The Guitar Of Štěpán Rak (1990)
- Dedications (1989)
- Terra Australis (1994)
- Teskně Hučí Niagara (1994)
- Hledání Lásky (1997)
- Song For David (2010)
- Chvála Čaje (2011)

== Family ==
His son Jan-Matěj Rak is a folk musician.

=== Works ===
- Stepan Rak’s "Tracy" (1994): A Transcription and Commentary Thesis by Reza Khota (2006)
