= Battalia insignis =

Scientific classification
- Kingdom: Animalia
- Phylum: Arthropoda
- Class: Insecta
- Order: Lepidoptera
- Family: Tortricidae
- Genus: Battalia
- Species: B. insignis

Binomial name
- Battalia insignis (Diakonoff, 1953)

Synonyms
- Parachorista insignis Diakonoff, 1953

Species of moth

Battalia insignis is a species of moth of the family Tortricidae. It is found in New Guinea.
