= Michele Campanella =

Italian pianist

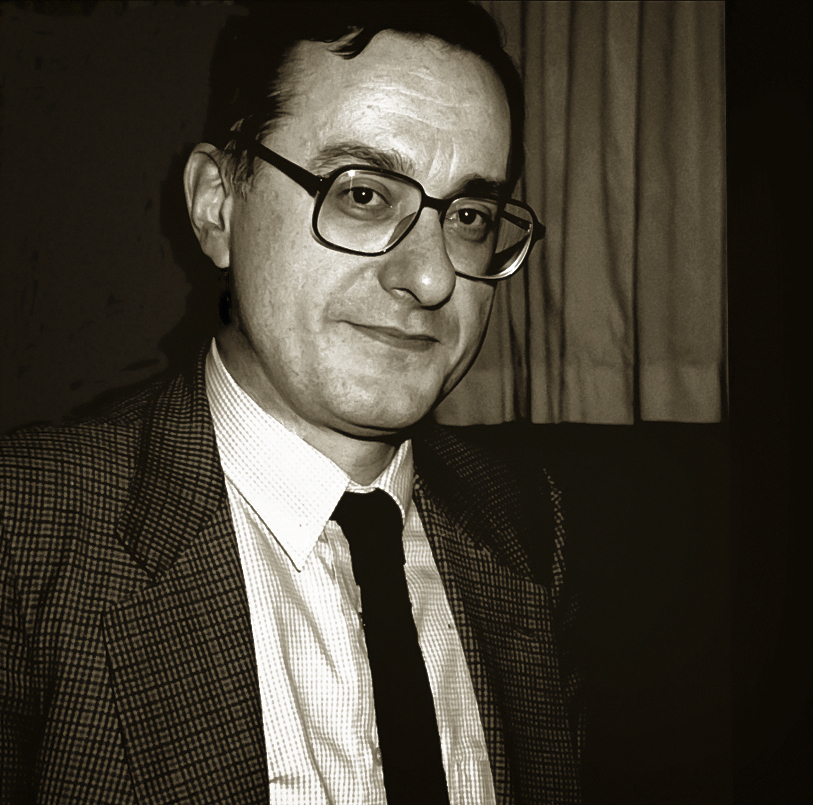
Michele Campanella

Michele Campanella (born 5 June 1947) is an Italian pianist who specialises in the music of Franz Liszt, and is also a conductor.

Campanella was born in Naples in 1947. He won the Alfredo Casella Prize at age 19, after studying with Vincenzo Vitale. This led to an international performing career, taking him to many countries (the United Kingdom, the United States, Australia, China, Argentina, Brazil), regularly appearing at international music festivals such as Lucerne, Vienna, Berlin, Prague, Taormina, Turin, and Pesaro, and working with such conductors as Claudio Abbado, Gianluigi Gelmetti, Vernon Handley, Eliahu Inbal, Sir Charles Mackerras, Zubin Mehta, Riccardo Muti, Georges Prêtre, Esa-Pekka Salonen, Wolfgang Sawallisch, Thomas Schippers, Hubert Soudant, and Christian Thielemann.

He is also a regular chamber music player, and has often appeared with Salvatore Accardo, Rocco Filippini and Claudio Desderi.

He has devoted complete seasons to a single composer—Franz Liszt, Ludwig van Beethoven, and Johannes Brahms.

He has recorded the complete works of Beethoven, Mozart's piano concertos, the complete variations by Brahms, and the complete Hungarian Rhapsodies and many of the major transcriptions of Liszt. For his Liszt recordings, Campanella received the Grand Prix du Disque of the Franz Liszt Society in Budapest in 1976, 1977 and 1998, as well as the "Premio della critica discografica italiana" in 1980. He also received the Fondazione Premio Napoli and Fondazione Guido e Roberto Cortese awards.

Campanella has also recorded works by Mily Balakirev, Ferruccio Busoni, Frédéric Chopin, Muzio Clementi, Modest Mussorgsky, Francis Poulenc, Maurice Ravel, Gioachino Rossini, Camille Saint-Saëns, Domenico Scarlatti, Franz Schubert, Pyotr Ilyich Tchaikovsky, and Carl Maria von Weber.

Campanella is a professor of piano at the Accademia Musicale Chigiana of Siena. He is also a member of the Accademia Nazionale di Santa Cecilia. He gives annual master classes at the Villa Rufolo in Ravello.

He has performed as conductor and soloist with several Italian orchestras, including the Orchestra dell'Accademia Nazionale di Santa Cecilia, the ORT-Orchestra della Toscana, the Haydn Orchestra of Bolzano and Trento, I Filarmonici di Verona, and the Orchestra da Camera of Padua.
