= List of musical pieces which use extended techniques =

This is a list of musical compositions that employ extended techniques to obtain unusual sounds or instrumental timbres.

- Hector Berlioz

"Dream of Witches' Sabbath" from Symphonie Fantastique. The violins and violas play col legno, striking the wood of their bows on the strings (Berlioz 1899, 220–22).

- Heinrich Ignaz Franz von Biber

Battalia (1673). The strings play col legno, striking the wood of their bows on the strings, in addition to numerous other techniques (Boyden 2001).

- François-Adrien Boieldieu

Le calife de Bagdad (opera, 1800), strings play col legno (Favre and Betzwieser 2001).

- Benjamin Britten

Passacaglia from Peter Grimes, rehearsal 6, "agitato", (pp. 16–17 of the score). The violins and violas play col legno, striking the wood of their bows on the strings (Britten 1945, 16–17).

- John Cage

prepared piano pieces (1938)

- Nicolas-Marie Dalayrac

Une heure de mariage (opera, 1804). Strings use col legno (Charlton 2001).

- Pascal Dusapin

Watt, concerto for trombone and orchestra (1994). Features "ample use of extended techniques" (Pace 1997, 19).

- Carlo Farina

Capriccio stravagante (from Ander Theil newer Paduanen, Gagliarden, Couranten, französischen Arien, 1627). The violins play glissando, pizzicato, tremolo, and in double stops, and use particular effects such as col legno (striking the wood of the bow on the strings) and sul ponticello (bowing close to the bridge), in order to imitate the sounds of a cat, a dog, a hen, the lyre, clarino trumpet, military drum, Spanish guitar, etc. (Boyden 2001; Pyron and Bianco 2001).

- Tobias Hume
  - "Harke, Harke", from First Part of Ayres (1605). The viol da gamba plays col legno, with the instruction "Drum this with the back of your Bow" (Boyden 2001; Morrow and Harris 2001; Traficante 2001).
- Charles Ives

Concord Sonata, use of a 14 3/4-inch-long (37 cm) piece of wood to create a cluster chord in the "Hawthorne" movement (Bruh 2011, 179).

- Helmut Lachenmann

After TemA (1968), almost all works make extensive use of extended techniques (Mosch 2001).

- Gustav Mahler

Symphony No. 1 in D major, third movement (p. 91 of the UE score) first violins, divisi a 3, play col legno tratto, stroking the strings with the wood of their bows (Piston 1955, 22).
Symphony No. 2 in C minor, first movement, bars 304–306, all the strings play col legno (some of the strings continue through 307), striking the wood of their bows on the strings (Marsh and Marsh 2016).

- Gioacchino Rossini

Il Signor Bruschino, in the overture, the second violins rhythmically tap their bows on their music stands

- Camille Saint-Saëns

Danse macabre, the strings play col legno to suggest the rattling of skeletons (Latham 2002)

- Arnold Schoenberg

Gurrelieder (1911), Die glückliche Hand (1910–1913), Pierrot Lunaire Op. 21 (1912), and Moses und Aron (1930–1932) all use Sprechstimme (Kennedy 2006).
String Quartet No. 4, op. 37 (1936). Fourth movement (Allegro), bars 882–888, all four instruments play col legno battuto, col legno tratto, and col legno tratto ponticello, on single notes and in double stops, tremolo, and in harmonics (Schoenberg 1939, 101–102).
String Trio, op. 45 (1946). The violin and cello play col legno battuto; the violin plays col legno tratto in double stops; all the instruments play col legno tratto ponticello, double stops; violin and viola play col legno tratto ponticello in double stops, which are also played tremolo (Boyden 2001; Schoenberg 1950, 1–5, 14, 18–19).

- Igor Stravinsky

The Firebird, the strings occasionally play col legno, striking the wood of their bows on the strings (Stravinsky 1964, 11, 40–43, 94–96, 102–103, 161–62)

- Heitor Villa-Lobos

Assobio a játo (1950), requires the flute to play "imitando fischi in toni ascendenti" (imitating whistles in rising tones), accomplished by blowing into the embouchure fff "as if one were warming up the instrument on a cold day" (Villa-Lobos 1953, 12, and an instruction slip inserted in the score).
Chôros No. 8 (1925), for orchestra and two pianos, requires one or both of the pianos to insert paper between the strings for a passage (Villa-Lobos 1928, 109–16).
