= Battalia (formation) =

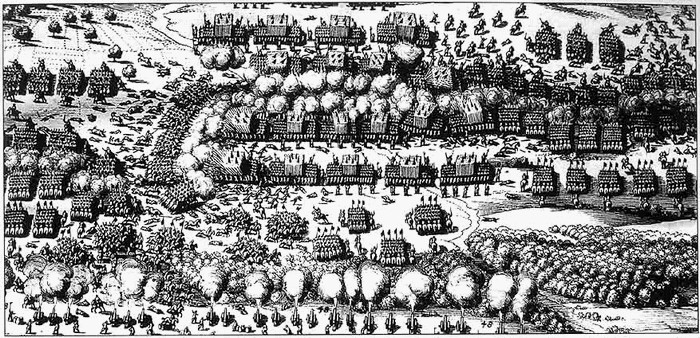
Contemporary etching of troop disposition at the beginning of the Battle of Breitenfeld (1631), painting in the Musée historique de Strasbourg.

From the late 16th century into the 18th century battalia, was a description used both for the positioning of units in an army (or navy) on a battle field and the formation in which individual units deployed for battle (battle array or battle order). Sometimes it was used to describe the main body of an army deployed for battle but excluding the wings and other units such as those deployed in front of the main line in skirmishing formation etc. Battalia differs from battalion which is generally the smallest military unit capable of independent operations and would have formed up in its battalia when going into battle.

== See also ==
- Pike and shot for details of different formation used in a battalia at the time the word was in common usage.

== Gallery ==
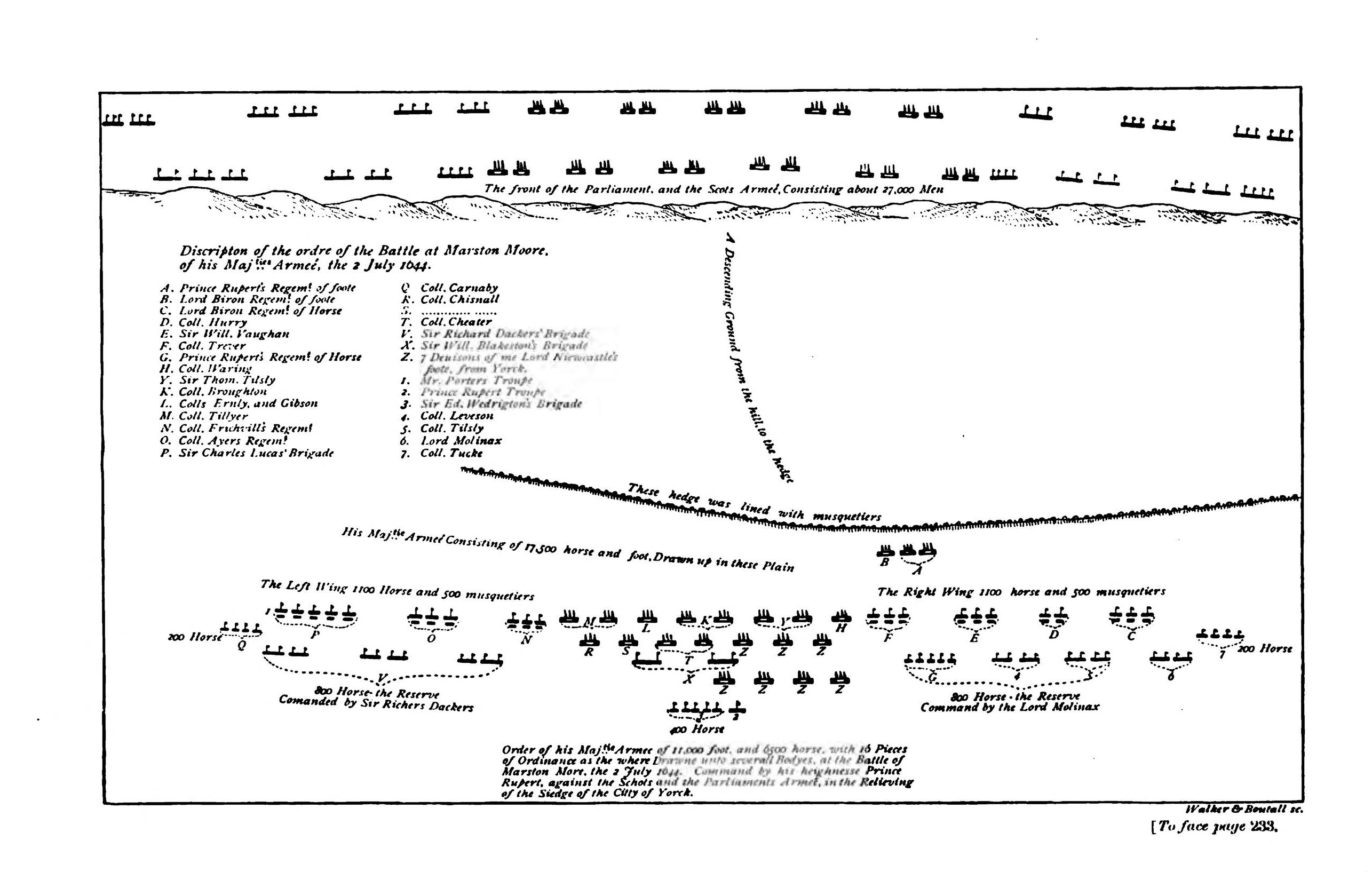
A plan of the Royalist battalia at Marston Moor, drawn up by Sir Bernard de Gomme

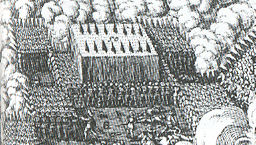
A tercio in "bastioned square," in battle
