= Ben Johnston (composer) =

American composer (1926–2019)

Benjamin Burwell Johnston Jr. (March 15, 1926 – July 21, 2019) was an American contemporary music composer, known for his use of just intonation. He was called "one of the foremost composers of microtonal music" by Philip Bush and "one of the best non-famous composers this country has to offer" by John Rockwell.

== Biography ==
Johnston was born in Macon, Georgia, and taught composition and theory at the University of Illinois at Urbana–Champaign from 1951 to 1986, before retiring to North Carolina. During his time teaching, he was in contact with avant-garde figures such as John Cage, La Monte Young, and Iannis Xenakis. Johnston's students included Stuart Saunders Smith, Neely Bruce, Thomas Albert, Michael Pisaro, Manfred Stahnke, and Kyle Gann. He also considered his practice of just intonation to have influenced other composers, including Larry Polansky. In 1946 he married dance band singer Dorothy Haines, but they soon divorced. In 1950 he married artist Betty Hall, who died in 2007.

Johnston began as a traditional composer of art music before working with Harry Partch. He helped the senior musician to build instruments and use them in the performance and recording of new compositions. Partch then arranged for Johnston to study with Darius Milhaud at Mills College. In 1952, Johnston met Cage, who invited him to come to New York to study with him in the summer. Though Johnston decided he did not have sufficient time to prepare for such studies, he did go to New York for several weeks and assisted, along with Earle Brown, in the production of Cage's eight-track tape composition, Williams Mix.

Later, in 1957 and 1959, he studied with Cage, who encouraged him to follow his desires and use traditional instruments rather than electronics or newly built instruments. Unskilled in carpentry and finding electronics unreliable, Johnston struggled with how to integrate microtonality and conventional instruments for ten years. He also struggled with how to integrate microtones into his compositional language through a slow process of many stages. However, since 1960 Johnston had almost exclusively used a system of microtonal notation based on the rational intervals of just intonation, what Gann describes as a "lifelong allegiance" to microtonality. Johnston also studied with Burrill Phillips and Robert Palmer.

Johnston composed music for multiple productions by the E.T.C. Company of La MaMa, Wilford Leach and John Braswell's company-in-residence at La MaMa Experimental Theatre Club in the East Village of Manhattan. His most significant work was Carmilla, which the company performed as part of their repertory throughout the 1970s. He also composed music for the company's production of Gertrude, a musical about the life of Gertrude Stein.

His other works included the orchestral work Quintet for Groups (commissioned by the St. Louis Symphony Orchestra), Sonnets of Desolation (commissioned by the Swingle Singers), the Sonata for Microtonal Piano (1964), and the Suite for Microtonal Piano (1977). Johnston completed ten string quartets. The Kepler Quartet recorded all ten of his string quartets for New World Records, finishing in April 2016 just after the composer's 90th birthday.

Johnston said:

Tempered tuning is not the acoustically simplest kind. In just tuning, any interval is tuned so as to eliminate 'beating' (the result of vibrations interfering with each other). Just intonation is the easiest to achieve by ear. In this kind of tuning, all intervals have vibration rates related by small whole-number ratios. The larger the integers of the ratio, the greater the dissonance.

He received many honors, including a Guggenheim Fellowship in 1959, a grant from the National Council on the Arts and the Humanities in 1966, two commissions from the Smithsonian Institution, and the Deems Taylor Award. In 2007, the American Academy of Arts and Letters honored Johnston for his lifetime of work. His Quintet for Groups won the SWR Sinfonieorchester prize at the 2008 Donaueschinger Musiktage.

Heidi Von Gunden wrote a monograph on the composer, and Bob Gilmore edited the composer's complete writings, which were published as "Maximum Clarity" and Other Writings on Music by the University of Illinois Press. A three-part oral history covering all stages of his career is housed at the Oral History of American Music through Yale University.

Johnston died from complications of Parkinson's disease in Deerfield, Wisconsin, on July 21, 2019.

== Music ==
He is best known for extending Harry Partch's experiments in just intonation tuning to traditional instruments through his system of notation.

Johnston's compositional style was eclectic. He used serial processes, folk song idioms (string quartets 4, 5, and 10), repetitive processes, traditional forms like fugue and variations, and intuitive processes. His main goal was "to reestablish just intonation as a viable part of our musical tradition." According to Mark Swed, "ultimately, what Johnston has done, more than any other composer with roots in the great American musical experiments of the '50s and '60s, is to translate those radical approaches to the nature of music into a music that is immediately apprehensible".

Most of Johnston's later works use a large number of pitches, generated through just-intonation procedures. In these works he formed melodies based on an "otonal" eight-note just-intonation scale made from the 8th through 15th partials of the harmonic series, or its "utonal" inversion. He then gained new pitches by using common-tone transpositions or inversions. Many of his works also feature an expansive use of just intonation, using high prime limits. His String Quartet No. 9 uses intervals of the harmonic series as high as the 31st partial. He used "potentially hundreds of pitches per octave," in a way that was "radical without being avant-garde"; in contrast with much twentieth-century music, he used microtones not for the creation of dissonance but in order to "return […] to a kind of musical beauty," which he perceived as diminished in Western music since the adoption of equal-temperament. "By the beginning of the 1980s he could say of his elaborately microtonal String Quartet no. 5... 'I have no idea as to how many different pitches it used per octave'".

Johnston's early efforts in just composition drew heavily on the accomplishments of post-Webern serialism. His 7-limit String Quartet no. 4 "Amazing Grace", was commissioned by the Fine Arts Music Foundation of Chicago, and was first recorded by the Fine Arts Quartet on Nonesuch Records in 1980 (then reissued on Gasparo as GS205). His String Quartet no. 4, perhaps Johnston's best-known composition, has also been recorded by the Kronos Quartet. The Kepler Quartet (Sharan Leventhal, Eric Segnitz, Brek Renzelman, and Karl Lavine) also recorded the piece for New World Records, as part of a complete 10-quartet series documenting Johnston's entire cycle of string quartets. The Third Quartet was premiered as part of this series by the Concord String Quartet at Alice Tully Hall at Lincoln Center for the Performing Arts, on March 15, 1976, the composer's fiftieth birthday.

=== Staff notation ===
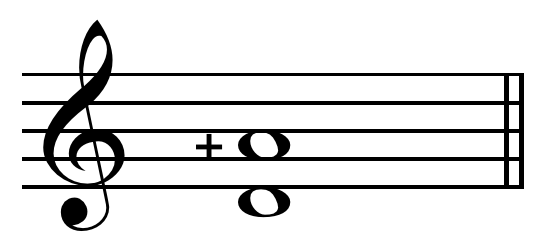
Just perfect fifth on D. The perfect fifth above D (A+, 27/16) is a syntonic comma (81/80 or 21.5 cents) higher than the just major sixth above C (A♮, 5/3), 27/16 ÷ 9/8 = 3/2.

Beginning in the 1960s, Johnston proposed an approach to notating music in just intonation (JI), redefining the understanding of conventional symbols (the seven "white" notes, along with the sharps and flats) and adding further accidentals, each designed to extend the notation into higher prime limits. Johnston's method is based on a diatonic C major scale tuned in JI, in which the interval between D (9/8 above C) and A (5/3 above C) is one Syntonic comma less than a Pythagorean perfect fifth 3:2. To write a perfect fifth, Johnston introduces a pair of symbols representing this comma, + and −. Thus, a series of perfect fifths beginning with F would proceed C G D A+ E+ B+. The three conventional white notes A E B are tuned as Ptolemaic major thirds (5:4, Ptolemy's intense diatonic scale) above F C G respectively. Johnston introduces new symbols for the septimal ( &), undecimal (↑ & ↓), tridecimal ( &), and further prime extensions to create an accidental-based exact JI notation for what he has named "extended just intonation".

Though "this notation is not tied to any particular diapason" and the ratios between pitches remain constant, most of Johnston’s works used A = 440 as the tuning note, making C 264 hertz. In Johnston’s notation a string quartet is tuned C−, G−, D−, A, E.

== Recordings ==
- 2016: Ben Johnston: String Quartets Nos. 7, 8 & 6, Quietness – Kepler Quartet (New World Records CD-80730)
  - String Quartet No. 7
  - String Quartet No. 8
  - String Quartet No. 6
  - "Quietness" (string quartet and voice)
- 2014: Ben Johnston: Ruminations – Eclipse String Quartet, John Schneider (voice, microtonal guitar), Karen Clark (voice), Jim Sullivan (clarinet), Sarah Thornblade (violin) (MicroFest Records CD-5)
  - "The Tavern"
  - "Revised Standards"
  - "Parable"
- 2011: Ben Johnston: String Quartets Nos. 1, 5 & 10 – Kepler Quartet (New World Records CD-80693)
  - String Quartet No. 5
  - String Quartet No. 10
  - String Quartet No. 1, "Nine Variations"
- 2008: On Track: Commissions Vol. 2. – New Century Saxophone Quartet (Alanna Records ACD-6006, Pittsburgh)
  - Includes Johnston's "O Waly Waly Variations"
- 2006: Ben Johnston: String Quartets Nos. 2, 3, 4 & 9 – Kepler Quartet (New World Records CD-80637)
  - String Quartet No. 9
  - Crossings: String Quartet No. 3
  - Crossings: The Silence
  - Crossings: String Quartet No. 4, "Amazing Grace"
  - String Quartet No. 2
- 2005: Susan Fancher: Ponder Nothing (Innova Records)
  - Includes Johnston's "Ponder Nothing"
- 2002: Cleveland Chamber Symphony. Vol. 1, 2 & 3 (Troppe Note Records)
  - Includes Johnston's "Songs of Loss"
- 1997: Phillip Bush: Microtonal Piano (Koch International Classics 3-7369-2-H1)
  - Includes Johnston's Suite for Microtonal Piano
  - Includes Johnston's Sonata for Microtonal Piano
  - Includes Johnston's "Saint Joan"
- 1996: Michael Cameron: Progression (Ziva Records)
  - Includes Johnston's "Progression"
- 1993: Ponder Nothing: Chamber Music of Ben Johnston (New World Records 80432-2)
  - Septet for woodwinds, horn, and strings
  - "Three Chinese Lyrics"
  - "Gambit:"
  - "Five Fragments"
  - Trio
  - "Ponder Nothing"
- 1995: The Stanford Quartet (Laurel Records)
  - Includes Johnston's String Quartet No. 9
- 1976: Sound Forms for Piano (LP record, New World Records NW-203)
  - Includes Johnston's Sonata for Microtonal Piano
- 1995: The Kronos Quartet: Released (compilation, Nonesuch Records)
  - Includes Johnston's String Quartet No. 4, "Amazing Grace"
- 1993: Urban Diva – Dora Ohrenstein (soprano), Mary Rowell (violin), Phillip Bush (keyboards), Bill Ruyle and Jason Cirker (percussion), John Thompson (electric bass) (Emergency Music, Composers Recordings Incorporated CD-654)
  - Includes Johnston's "Calamity Jane to Her Daughter"
- 1987: White Man Sleeps – Kronos Quartet (Elektra/Nonesuch 79163-2)
  - Includes Johnston's String Quartet No. 4, "Amazing Grace"
- 1984: New Swingle Singers and New Vocal Workshop (Composers Recordings, Inc.)
  - Includes Johnston's "Sonnets of Desolation"
  - Includes Johnston's "Visions and Spels"
- 1983: The New World Quartet (Composers Recordings, Inc.)
  - Includes Johnston's String Quartet No. 6
- 1980: The Fine Arts Quartet (Nonesuch Records)
  - Includes Johnston's String Quartet No. 4, "Amazing Grace"
- 1979: Music from the University of Illinois (Composers Recordings, Inc.)
  - Includes Johnston's Duo for flute and contrabass
- 1970: Carmilla: A Vampire Tale (Vanguard Records)
- 1969: John Cage & Lejaren Hiller – HPSCHD/ Ben Johnston – String Quartet No. 2. (LP record, Nonesuch Records H-71224)
- 1969: The Contemporary Contrabass - Bertram Turetzky, contrabass (LP record, Nonesuch Records H-71237)
  - Includes Johnston's "Casta*"
- 1968: New Music Choral Ensemble – Kenneth Gaburo, conductor (LP record, Ars Nova/Ars Antiqua Records AN1005)
  - Includes Johnston's "Ci-Git Satie"

== Footnotes ==
=== References ===
- Bush, Phillip. 1997. Liner notes (unpaginated) to Microtonal Piano by Ben Johnston. Phillip Bush, piano. Koch International Classics 3-7369-2. Port Washington, NY: Koch International. [Quotes The New Grove Dictionary of American Music and critic Mark Swed.]
- Fonville, John. 1991. "Ben Johnston's Extended Just Intonation: A Guide for Interpreters". Perspectives of New Music 29, no. 2 (Summer): 106–137.
- Gann, Kyle. 1995. Music Amici: Ben Johnston: Ponder Nothing. New World Records. Cat. No.: 80432. Liner notes.
- Johnston, Ben. 2006b. "A Notation System for Extended Just Intonation" (2003). In Ben Johnston, "Maximum Clarity" and Other Writings on Music, edited by Bob Gilmore, 77–88. ISBN 978-0-252-03098-7.
- Swed, Mark. 1995. "Ben Johnston". Chamber Music Magazine (March):
- Tyranny, "Blue" Gene. 2011. "Ben Johnston: Biography", AllMusic.com.
- Von Gunden, Heidi. 1986. The Music of Ben Johnston. Metuchen, New Jersey, and London: The Scarecrow Press, Inc. ISBN 0-8108-1907-4.
