= Battalia (moth) =

Scientific classification
- Kingdom: Animalia
- Phylum: Arthropoda
- Class: Insecta
- Order: Lepidoptera
- Family: Tortricidae
- Subfamily: Tortricinae
- Tribe: Archipini
- Genus: Battalia; Koçak, 1981

Synonyms
- Parachorista Diakonoff, 1952 (preocc.)

Genus of tortrix moths

Battalia is a genus of moths belonging to the subfamily Tortricinae of the family Tortricidae. Although first described in 1952 by Alexey Diakonoff from New Guinean specimens collected by the Third Archbold Expedition, the name he gave the genus—Parachorista—was preoccupied. The replacement name Battalia was first published in 1981 by Ahmet Ömer Koçak.

== Species ==
As of 2024, Gilligan, Baixeras and Brown's Online World Catalogue of the Tortricidae lists the following species:

- Battalia acmemorpha (Diakonoff, 1952)
- Battalia anassa (Diakonoff, 1952)
- Battalia anisographa (Diakonoff, 1952)
- Battalia anthracograpta (Diakonoff, 1952)
- Battalia apheles (Diakonoff, 1952)
- Battalia colobodesma (Diakonoff, 1952)
- Battalia cricophora (Diakonoff, 1952)
- Battalia euphyes (Diakonoff, 1952)
- Battalia fusca (Diakonoff, 1953)
- Battalia insignis (Diakonoff, 1953)
- Battalia lagaroptycha (Diakonoff, 1952)
- Battalia lutescens (Diakonoff, 1952)
- Battalia mimela (Diakonoff, 1952)
- Battalia ochra (Diakonoff, 1952)
- Battalia oligosta (Diakonoff, 1952)
- Battalia pityrochroa (Diakonoff, 1952)
- Battalia psara (Diakonoff, 1952)
- Battalia rhopalodes (Diakonoff, 1952)
- Battalia stenoptera (Diakonoff, 1952)
- Battalia trulligera (Diakonoff, 1952)
- Battalia verecunda (Diakonoff, 1952)

== See also ==
- List of Tortricidae genera
