= Bob Gilmore =

Northern Irish musician and musicologist (1961–2015)

- Born: 6 June 1961; Larne, Northern Ireland, United Kingdom
- Died: 2 January 2015 (aged 53)
- Education: Queen's University Belfast

Bob Gilmore (6 June 1961 – 2 January 2015) was a musicologist, educator and keyboard player.

Born in Larne, Northern Ireland, he spent his early years in Carrickfergus. He studied music at the University of York, England, then at Queen's University Belfast (PhD. 1992), and, on a Fulbright Scholarship, at the University of California, San Diego. He is best known for his books on American music: he wrote Harry Partch: A Biography (Yale University Press, 1998) and edited with an introduction "Maximum Clarity" and Other Writings on Music (University of Illinois Press, 2006—collected writings by Ben Johnston), both of which were recipients of the Deems Taylor Award from ASCAP. He also wrote extensively on the American experimental tradition, microtonal music and spectral music, including the work of such figures as James Tenney, Horațiu Rădulescu, Claude Vivier, and Frank Denyer. He wrote on the work of younger Irish composers including Deirdre Gribbin, Donnacha Dennehy and Jennifer Walshe in the Journal of Music in Ireland. He taught at Queen's University Belfast, Dartington College of Arts, and Brunel University in London. He was a Research Fellow and Director of Research at Orpheus Instituut in Ghent. He was the founder, director and keyboard player of Trio Scordatura, an Amsterdam-based ensemble dedicated to the performance of microtonal music, and for the year 2014 was editor of Tempo, a quarterly journal of new music. His biography of French-Canadian composer Claude Vivier was published by University of Rochester Press in June 2014.

== Bibliography ==
- Gilmore, Bob. 1995. "Changing the Metaphor: Ratio Models of Musical Pitch in the Work of Harry Partch, Ben Johnston, and James Tenney", Perspectives of New Music 33, nos. 1 & 2 (Winter–Summer 1995): 458–503.
- Gilmore, Bob. 1998. Harry Partch: A Biography. New Haven, Connecticut: Yale University Press. ISBN 0-300-06521-3.
- Gilmore, Bob. 2003. "'Wild Ocean': An Interview with Horațiu Rădulescu". Contemporary Music Review 22, nos. 1–2 (March–June): 105–122.
- Gilmore, Bob. 2003. "The Climate Since Harry Partch", Contemporary Music Review 22 (1 and 2): 15–33.
- Gilmore, Bob. 2005. "Composition as Vandalism: The Music of Donnacha Dennehy", Journal of Music in Ireland 5(6): 29–33.
- Johnston, Ben. 2006. 'Maximum Clarity' and Other Writings on Music (edited with an introduction by Bob Gilmore). Urbana and Chicago: University of Illinois Press. ISBN 0-252-03098-2.
- Gilmore, Bob. 2006. "Minimalism Schminimalism", Journal of Music in Ireland 6(1): 6–9.
- Gilmore, Bob. 2006. "Wild Air: The Music of Kevin Volans". Journal of Music in Ireland 6(6), 22–29.]
- Gilmore, Bob. 2007. "On Claude Vivier's Lonely Child". Tempo, new series 61, no. 239: 2–17.
- Gilmore, Bob. 2007. "An Interview with Phill Niblock", Paris Transatlantic Magazine.
- Gilmore, Bob. 2007. "Don't Do PERMISSION ISN'T: The Music of Jennifer Walshe", Journal of Music in Ireland 7 (4): 20–24.
- Gilmore, Bob. 2008. "James Tenney and the poetics of homage", Contemporary Music Review 27 (1): 7–21.
- Gilmore, Bob. 2008. "Resonant Air: the music of Michael Alcorn", Journal of Music in Ireland 8 (1): 28–32.
- Gilmore, Bob. 2008. "All Collisions End in Static: The Music of Linda Buckley", Journal of Music in Ireland 8 (5): 28–32.
- Gilmore, Bob (2009). "Dennehy, Donnacha". Grove Music Online. Oxford: Oxford University Press. doi:10.1093/gmo/9781561592630.article.2082335. (subscription, Wikilibrary access, or UK public library membership required)
- Gilmore, Bob and Hirs, R. 2009. Contemporary Compositional Techniques And Openmusic Editions Delatour France/IRCAM-Centre Pompidou.
- Gilmore, Bob. 2009. "Music by Committee", The Journal of Music 1 (1):20.
- Gilmore, Bob. 2009. "Remembering Horatiu", The Journal of Music 1 (2): 20–21.
- Gilmore, Bob. 2009. "He’s Just Not That Into You", The Journal of Music 1 (2): 20–21.
- Gilmore, Bob. 2007. "Interview with Clarence Barlow". Paris Transatlantic Magazine.
- Gilmore, Bob. 2009. "Claude Vivier and Karlheinz Stockhausen: Moments from a Double Portrait". Circuit: musiques contemporaines 19, no. 2:35–49. (Subscription access)
- Gilmore, Bob. 2009. "James Tenney: Spectrum Pieces". Liner notes. New World Records.
- Gilmore, Bob, 2010. "Spectral Techniques in Horatiu Radulescu's Second Piano Sonata 'Being and Non-being Create Each Other' Op. 82", Tempo, new series, no. 252:66–78.
- Gilmore, Bob, 2011. The Ear of the Voice of the Eye: Yannis Kyriakides, Composer. (Tilburg: teleXpress)
- Gilmore, Bob. 2011. "An Interview with Frederic Rzewski". Paris Transatlantic Magazine.
- Gilmore, Bob. 2012. "Difficult Listening Hour”, in The Journal of Music.
- Gilmore, Bob, 2012. "Making a Friend", Liner notes to: "Harald Muenz. nearly – fast". Darmstadt: Coviello Contemporary.
- Gilmore, Bob. 2012. "Phill Niblock: The Orchestra Pieces". Tempo vol. 66 no. 244, 2–11.
- Gilmore, Bob. 2014. Claude Vivier: A Composer's Life. University of Rochester Press. ISBN 978-1-58046-485-7.
