= Ray Sasaki =

American trumpeter (born 1948)

Ray Sasaki (born October 22, 1948) is an American trumpeter. He was Professor of Trumpet at the University of Texas at Austin, until his retirement in 2018, and a member of the St. Louis Brass Quintet. Sasaki is also one of the founding members of the Tone Road Ramblers, a composer/performer collective ensemble started in 1981 in New York City. He was previously on the faculty of the University of Illinois.
