= Phillip Bush =

American musician

Phillip Bush (born January 4, 1961, in Ridgewood, New Jersey) is an American classical pianist, with a career focusing primarily on chamber music and contemporary classical music.

== Early life ==
Phillip Bush was born to an American father and German mother and lived in Ridgewood, New Jersey. He grew up in Charlotte, North Carolina, where his father taught French at the University of North Carolina-Charlotte. Bush studied at the Peabody Conservatory with Leon Fleisher, and has said that he still considers Fleisher his major musical influence. Bush spent two years at Banff Centre School of Fine Arts in Canada from 1981 to 1983; there he met Steve Reich and several other musicians who were formative influences for the direction of his career. He subsequently moved to New York City, and for most of his career was based there. In recent years he has made his home elsewhere in the U.S., teaching for several years at the University of Michigan and then moving to Columbia, South Carolina, where he lives today.

== Career ==
He was winner of the 1983 American Piano Awards national competition and made his New York recital debut in 1984 at the Metropolitan Museum of Art. As a soloist, Bush has championed the work of many living composers, and has recorded piano works of Ben Johnston and John Zorn, among others. Bush is a regular at various chamber music festivals throughout the United States, and has collaborated with many major American instrumentalists. His work as a "sideman" in chamber and contemporary recording sessions currently stands at some thirty recordings on various labels including Virgin Classics, Sony, Koch International, Denon, and New World Records, with groups such as The Chamber Music Society of Lincoln Center. In 2007 he was named Music Director of the Chamber Music Conference and Composers' Forum of the East, an annual month-long summer festival on the campus of Bennington College in Vermont. In the autumn of 2014, Bush announced he would be stepping down from the position at the end of the 2015 BCMC, his ninth season.

In the contemporary music field, Bush was a keyboardist with Philip Glass' ensemble on and off from 1987 till 2007, and also with Steve Reich and Musicians from 1986 until 2008. Bush was the pianist for Milwaukee's Present music contemporary group from 1995 until he retired from the group in 2010. Other long group associations included a stint from 1992 to 1999 with the classical crossover piano quartet "Typhoon," led by violinist Iwao Furusawa and immensely popular in Japan through the 90s with several top-selling CDs. In 2001 Bush made his Carnegie Hall solo concerto debut on short notice, replacing an ailing Peter Serkin as soloist with the London Sinfonietta in concerti by Stravinsky and Alexander Goehr to critical acclaim. Bush's efforts on behalf of contemporary American music have earned him awards and grants from the Aaron Copland Fund and the National Endowment for the Arts. In 2012 Bush was named Associate Professor of Piano and Chamber Music at the University of South Carolina School of Music.
