= D. Stanley Hasty =

Donald Stanley Hasty (February 21, 1920 - June 22, 2011) was professor emeritus of clarinet at the Eastman School of Music.

Hasty joined the Eastman faculty and the Rochester Philharmonic Orchestra in 1955. Before coming to Rochester, he served as principal clarinet for the Cleveland Orchestra, the Pittsburgh Symphony Orchestra, the Indianapolis Orchestra, and the Baltimore Symphony Orchestra.

He served as professor of clarinet or principal teacher of clarinet at the Cleveland Institute, the Peabody Conservatory, Indiana University, Carnegie Institute (now the Mellon Institute), the New England Conservatory, and the Juilliard School of Music. Hasty retired in 1985.

== Awards ==
Hasty received the University Mentor Award for faculty members who have served as both distinguished scholars and outstanding teachers, and the Eisenhart Award in recognition of outstanding teaching. In 1980, Eastman celebrated the "Hasty Festival" to commemorate his 25 years of teaching at the school.
