= Eric Mandat =

American clarinetist and composer (born 1957)

Eric Paul Mandat (born 1957) is an American clarinetist and composer.

Mandat began his clarinet studies under the tutelage of Richard Joiner of the Denver Symphony. He later studied with Lee Gibson, Keith Wilson, D. Stanley Hasty, and Charles Neidich. He received his undergraduate education at the University of North Texas and graduate degrees from Yale School of Music and Eastman School of Music.

He has performed in the Chicago Symphony Orchestra's MusicNOW Series (including as principal clarinet for Pierre Boulez's 80th Birthday Concert under Boulez's baton and a performance of Osvaldo Golijov's Ayre with Dawn Upshaw). He also performs with the Tone Road Ramblers, a band specializing in experimental and improvised music. His reviews of clarinet recordings have appeared in The Clarinet. Mandat's recordings include The Extended Clarinet as well as recordings with the Tone Road Ramblers and the Transatlantic Trio.

Mandat has taught at Southern Illinois University Carbondale and Indiana University. His students from Carbondale include Sean Osborn of the Metropolitan Opera Michael Norsworthy, and Boja Kragulj.

Mandat uses extended techniques such as multiphonics and microtones. In a November 2005 review of Sean Osborn's album American Spirit, Fanfare magazine remarked that Mandat's music creates "amazing technical effects for the instrument" that are "startling and eerie." In a review in The Clarinet of Mandat's Folk Songs, the author found that "A composition of this caliber will most likely enter the performance repertoire as the representative piece of the decade!" Reviewing Mandat's The Extended Clarinet in The Clarinet, Michele Gingras wrote, "In one word, 'The Extended Clarinet' is astonishing. Eric Mandat's process at writing and playing is bound to leave any listener in awe." Although most of his corpus consists of works for solo clarinet, he has also written for clarinet ensembles.

== Discography ==
- Eric P. Mandat & Ron Coulter Open Lands Kreating SounD 2015
