= Synthetic media =

Artificial production of media by automated means

Synthetic media is digital content in various media formats, including text, image, and video, which has been automatically and artificially produced or manipulated. Although not all synthetic media is generated by artificial intelligence (AI), it often refers to the use of generative AI (GenAI) to produce content, such as deepfakes, through the use of AI within a set of human-prompted parameters.

Synthetic media as a field has grown rapidly since the creation of generative adversarial networks (GANs), primarily through the rise of deepfakes as well as music synthesis, text generation, human image synthesis, speech synthesis, and more. Though experts use the term "synthetic media," individual methods such as deepfakes and text synthesis are sometimes not referred to as such by the media but instead by their respective terminology (and often use "deepfakes" as a euphemism, e.g., "deepfakes for text" for natural-language generation; "deepfakes for voices" for neural voice cloning, etc.) The field of synthetic media gained significant attention starting in 2017, when Motherboard reported on the emergence of AI-altered pornographic videos to insert the faces of famous actresses. Potential hazards of synthetic media include the spread of misinformation, further loss of trust in institutions such as media and government, the mass automation of creative and journalistic jobs, and a retreat into AI-generated fantasy worlds. Synthetic media is an applied form of artificial imagination.

== History ==
=== Pre-1950s ===
Maillardet's automaton drawing a picture

The idea of automated art dates back to the automata of ancient Greek civilization. Nearly 2,000 years ago, the engineer Hero of Alexandria described statues that could move and mechanical theatrical devices. Over the centuries, mechanical artworks drew crowds throughout Europe, China, and India. Other automated novelties, such as Johann Philipp Kirnberger's "Musikalisches Würfelspiel" (Musical Dice Game) 1757, also amused audiences.

Despite the technical capabilities of these machines, however, none were capable of generating original content and were entirely dependent upon their mechanical designs.

=== Rise of artificial intelligence ===
The field of AI research was born at a workshop at Dartmouth College in 1956, begetting the rise of digital computing used as a medium of art as well as the rise of generative art. Initial experiments in AI-generated art included the Illiac Suite, a 1957 composition for string quartet, which is generally agreed to be the first score composed by an electronic computer. Lejaren Hiller, in collaboration with Leonard Issacson, programmed the ILLIAC I computer at the University of Illinois at Urbana–Champaign (where both composers were professors) to generate compositional material for his String Quartet No. 4.

In 1960, Russian researcher R.Kh.Zaripov published the first paper worldwide on algorithmic music composing using the "Ural-1" computer.

In 1965, inventor Ray Kurzweil premiered a piano piece created by a computer that was capable of pattern recognition in various compositions. The computer was then able to analyze and use these patterns to create novel melodies. The computer was debuted on Steve Allen's I've Got a Secret program, and stumped the hosts until film star Harry Morgan guessed Ray's secret.

Before 1989, artificial neural networks (ANNs) were used to model certain aspects of creativity. Peter Todd (1989) first trained a neural network to reproduce musical melodies from a training set of musical pieces. Then he used a change algorithm to modify the network's input parameters. The network was able to randomly generate new music in a highly uncontrolled manner.

In 2014, computer scientist Ian Goodfellow and his colleagues developed a new class of machine learning systems: generative adversarial networks (GANs). Two neural networks contest with each other in a game (in the sense of game theory, often but not always in the form of a zero-sum game). Given a training set, this technique learns to generate new data with the same statistics as the training set. For example, a GAN trained on photographs can generate new photographs that look at least superficially authentic to human observers, having many realistic characteristics. Though originally proposed as a form of generative model for unsupervised learning, GANs have also proven useful for semi-supervised learning, fully supervised learning, and reinforcement learning. In a 2016 seminar, computer scientist Yann LeCun described GANs as "the coolest idea in machine learning in the last twenty years".

In 2017, Google unveiled transformers, a new type of neural network architecture specialized for language modeling that enabled for rapid advancements in natural language processing. Transformers proved capable of high levels of generalization, allowing networks such as GPT-3 and Jukebox from OpenAI to synthesize text and music respectively at a level approaching humanlike ability. There have been some attempts to use GPT-3 and GPT-2 for screenplay writing, resulting in both dramatic (the Italian short film Frammenti di Anime Meccaniche, written by GPT-2) and comedic (the short film Solicitors by YouTube creator Calamity AI written by GPT-3) narratives.

== Branches of synthetic media ==
=== Deepfakes ===
Deepfakes (a portmanteau of "deep learning" and "fake") are the most prominent form of synthetic media. Deepfakes are media productions that use an existing image or video and replace the subject with someone else's likeness using ANNs. They often combine and superimpose existing media onto source media using machine learning techniques known as autoencoders and GANs. Deepfakes have garnered widespread attention and criticism for their use in celebrity pornographic videos, revenge porn, fake news, hoaxes, and financial fraud. This has elicited responses from both industry and government to detect and limit their use.

The term deepfakes originated around the end of 2017 from a Reddit user named "deepfakes". He, along with others in the Reddit community r/deepfakes, shared deepfakes they created; many videos involved celebrities' faces swapped onto the bodies of actresses in pornographic videos, while non-pornographic content included videos with actor Nicolas Cage's face swapped into various movies. In December 2017, Samantha Cole published an article about r/deepfakes in Vice that drew the first mainstream attention to deepfakes being shared in online communities. Six weeks later, Cole wrote in a follow-up article about the increase in AI-assisted fake pornography. According to a study conducted by Sensity, a company that detects and tracks deepfakes online, 85,047 deepfake videos had been found on online streaming websites by December 2020. This number was expected to double every six months. In September 2019, Sensity revealed that 96% of the fake videos were non-consensual pornography. Most of the victims of these videos were celebrities or high-profile individuals.

In February 2018, r/deepfakes was banned by Reddit for sharing involuntary pornography. Other websites have also banned the use of deepfakes for involuntary pornography, including the social media platform X (formerly Twitter) and the pornography site Pornhub. However, some websites have not banned Deepfake content, including 4chan and 8chan.

Non-pornographic deepfake content continues to grow in popularity with videos from YouTube creators such as Ctrl Shift Face and Shamook. A mobile application, Impressions, was launched for iOS in March 2020. The app provides a platform for users to deepfake celebrity faces into videos in a matter of minutes.

=== Image synthesis ===
Image synthesis is the artificial production of visual media, especially through algorithmic means. In the emerging world of synthetic media, the work of digital-image creation—once the domain of highly skilled programmers and Hollywood special-effects artists—can be automated by expert systems capable of producing realism on a vast scale. One subfield of this includes human image synthesis, which is the use of neural networks to make believable and even photorealistic renditions of human-likenesses, moving or still. It has effectively existed since the early 2000s. Many films using computer-generated imagery (CGI) have featured synthetic images of human-like characters digitally composited onto the real or other simulated film material. Since the end of the 2010s, deep learning AI has been applied to synthesize images and video that look like humans, without need for human assistance, once the training phase has been completed—whereas the old school 7D-route required massive amounts of human work. The website This Person Does Not Exist showcases fully automated human image synthesis by generating images that look like facial portraits of human faces.

=== Audio synthesis ===
Beyond deepfakes and image synthesis, audio is another area where AI is used to create synthetic media. Synthesized audio will be capable of generating any conceivable sound that can be achieved through audio waveform manipulation, which might conceivably be used to generate stock audio of sound effects or simulate audio of currently imaginary things.

=== AI art ===
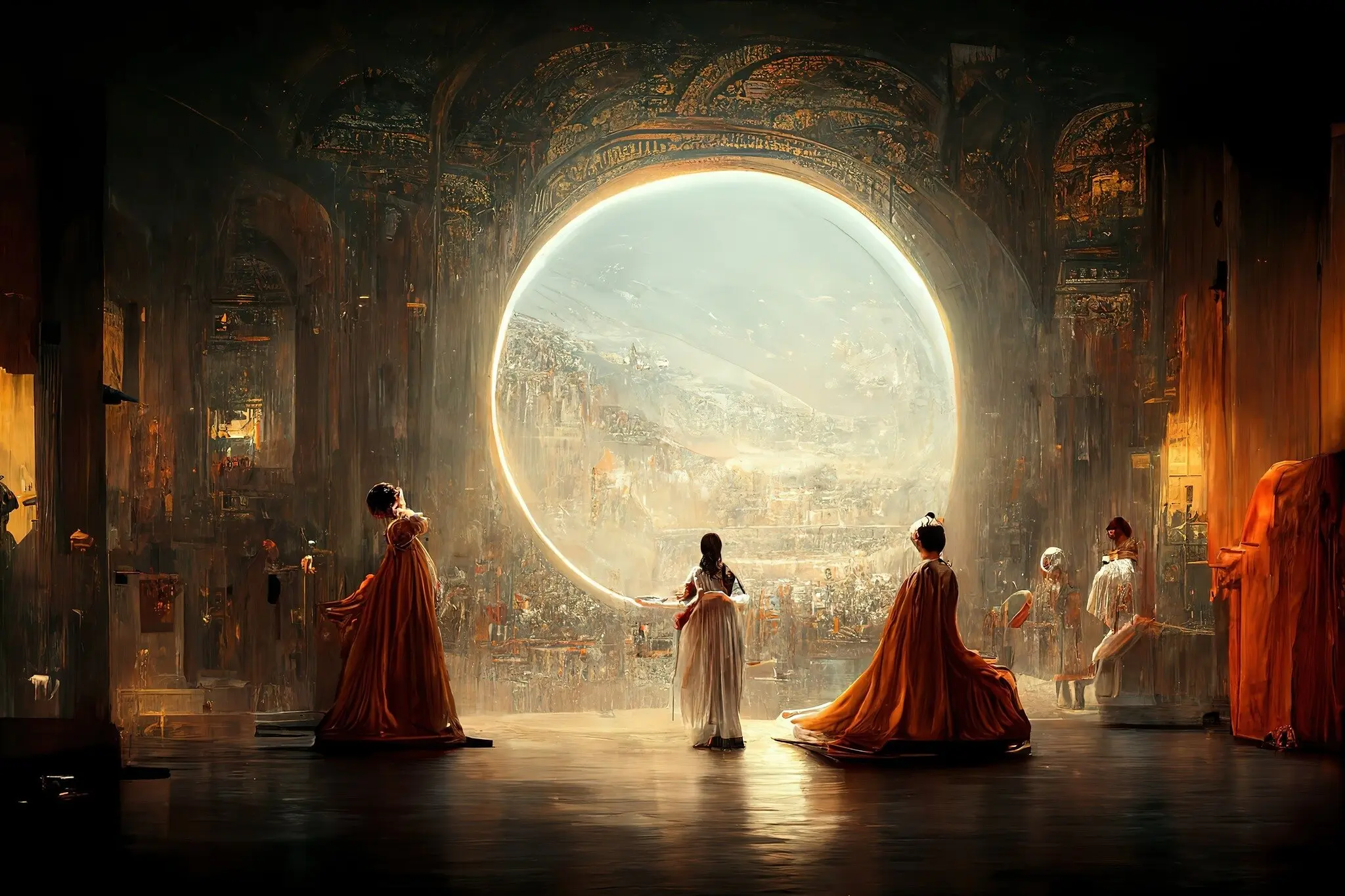
Théâtre D'opéra Spatial (Space Opera Theater; 2022) won the 2022 Colorado State Fair's annual fine art competition in the "emerging artist" (non-professional) division of the "Digital Arts/Digitally-Manipulated Photography" category.

Artificial intelligence visual art, or AI art, is artistic content generated or assisted by AI programs. The classification of AI output as "art" remains controversial, and AI-created works have been variously rejected or recognized by existing artistic institutions.

The application of robotics or primitive algorithms to art has been discussed or practiced since antiquity; however, the term primarily refers to visual works created by modern GenAI trained on preexisting content. During the AI boom of the 2020s, text-to-image models such as Midjourney, DALL-E and Stable Diffusion became widely available to the public, allowing users to quickly generate imagery with little effort.

The history of AI has raised many questions on the nature of art in human-AI collaboration, while commentary about AI art in the 2020s has often focused on issues related to copyright, deception, defamation, and its impact on more traditional artists, including technological unemployment. AI art frequently constitutes AI slop, mass-produced content for online engagement at the expense of quality.

In August 2023, the U.S. Supreme Court ruled that AI art is ineligible for copyright due to failure to meet human authorship. In March 2026, it declined to hear a case over whether AI-generated art can be subject to copyright.

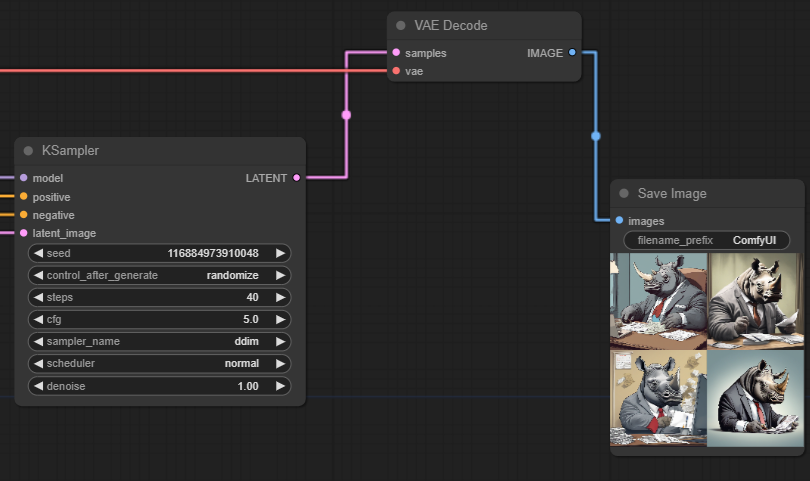
Example of a usage of ComfyUI for Stable Diffusion XL. People can adjust variables (such as CFG, seed, and sampler) needed to generate image.

Many tools are available to artists working with diffusion models. They can define both positive and negative prompts, but they are also afforded a choice in using (or omitting the use of) VAEs, LoRAs, hypernetworks, IP-adapter, and embedding/textual inversions. Artists can tweak settings like guidance scale (which balances creativity and accuracy), seed (to control randomness), and upscalers (to enhance image resolution), among others. Additional influence can be exerted during pre-inference by means of noise manipulation, while traditional post-processing techniques are frequently used post-inference. People can also train their own models.

Procedural "rule-based" image generation techniques have also been developed, utilizing mathematical patterns, algorithms that simulate brush strokes and other painterly effects, as well as deep learning models like GANs and transformers. Several companies have released applications and websites that allow users to focus exclusively on positive prompts, bypassing the need for manual configuration of other parameters. There are also programs capable of transforming photographs into stylized images that mimic the aesthetics of well-known painting styles.

Others options range from simple consumer-facing mobile apps to Jupyter notebooks and web UIs that require powerful GPUs to run effectively. Additional functionalities include "textual inversion," which refers to enabling the use of user-provided concepts (like an object or a style) learned from a few images. Novel art can then be generated from the associated word(s) (the text that has been assigned to the learned, often abstract, concept) and model extensions or fine-tuning (such as DreamBooth).

==== Music generation ====
The capacity to generate music through autonomous, non-programmable means has long been sought after since the days of Antiquity. With developments in AI, two particular domains have arisen:

1. The robotic creation of music, whether through machines playing instruments or sorting of virtual instrument notes (such as through Musical Instrument Digital Interface, or MIDI, files).
2. Directly generating waveforms that perfectly recreate instrumentation and human voice without the need for instruments, MIDI, or organizing premade notes.

In 2019, one such example of AI-generated music was Dadabots, an AI-generated stream of death metal which remains ongoing with no pauses.

Universal Music Group and Sony Music have filed copyright infringement lawsuits against the AI music-generator Suno, alleging the company copied songs without permission to train its AI models. Concerns about ethics, responsibility, and transparency have prompted AI music-generation platforms to revise their approaches. In August 2026, Spotify added an "AI persona" label to AI-generated songs.

=== Speech synthesis ===
Speech synthesis has been identified as a popular branch of synthetic media and is defined as the artificial production of human speech. A computer system used for this purpose is called a speech computer or speech synthesizer, and it can be implemented in software or hardware products. A text-to-speech (TTS) system converts normal language text into speech; other systems render symbolic linguistic representations, like phonetic transcriptions, into speech.

Synthesized speech can be created by concatenating pieces of recorded speech that are stored in a database. Systems differ in the size of the stored speech units; a system that stores phones or diphones provides the largest output range, but may lack clarity. For specific usage domains, the storage of entire words or sentences allows for high-quality output. Alternatively, a synthesizer can incorporate a model of the vocal tract and other human voice characteristics to create a completely "synthetic" voice output.

Virtual assistants, such as Apple's Siri and Amazon's Alexa, have the ability to turn text into audio and synthesize speech.

In 2016, Google DeepMind unveiled WaveNet, a deep generative model of raw audio waveforms that could learn to understand which waveforms best resembled human speech as well as musical instrumentation. Some projects offer real-time generations of synthetic speech using deep learning, such as 15.ai, a web application text-to-speech tool developed by a Massachusetts Institute of Technology (MIT) research scientist.

=== Natural-language generation ===
Natural-language generation (NLG, sometimes synonymous with text synthesis) is a software process that transforms structured data into natural language. It can be used to produce long-form content for organizations to automate custom reports, as well as produce custom content for a web or mobile application. It can also be used to generate short blurbs of text in interactive conversations (a chatbot), which may be read out by a text-to-speech system. Interest in natural-language generation increased in 2019 after OpenAI unveiled GPT2, an AI system that generates text matching its input in subject and tone. GPT2 is a transformer, a deep machine learning model introduced in 2017 used primarily in the field of natural language processing (NLP).

=== Interactive media synthesis ===
AI-generated media can be used to develop a hybrid graphics system that could be used in video games, movies, and virtual reality, as well as text-based games such as AI Dungeon 2, which uses either GPT-2 or GPT-3 to allow for near-infinite possibilities that are otherwise impossible to create through traditional game development methods. Computer hardware company Nvidia has also worked on developed AI-generated video game demos, such as a model that can generate an interactive game based on non-interactive videos.

== Concerns and controversies ==
Synthetic media can potentially affect public reaction to celebrities, political party or organizations, business or MNCs and harm their image and reputation. It may also erode social trust in public and private institutions, and it will be harder to maintain a belief in the ability to verify or authenticate "real" over "fake" content. A 2019 journal identified the public officials who may be most affected as "elected officials, appointed officials, judges, juries, legislators, staffers, and agencies." Even private institutions will have to develop an awareness and policy responses to this new media form, particularly if they have a wider impact on society. The journal further states, "religious institutions are an obvious target, as are politically engaged entities ranging from Planned Parenthood to the NRA". Also, researchers are concerned that synthetic media may deepen and extend social hierarchy or class differences which gave rise to them in the first place.

=== Politics ===
The US Congress held a senate meeting discussing the widespread impacts of synthetic media, including deepfakes, describing it as having the "potential to be used to undermine national security, erode public trust in our democracy and other nefarious reasons."

Deepfakes have been used to misrepresent well-known politicians. In separate videos, the face of Argentine President Mauricio Macri was replaced by the face of dictator Adolf Hitler, and German Chancellor Angela Merkel's face has been replaced with US President Donald Trump's.

Starting in November 2019, multiple social media networks began banning synthetic media used for purposes of manipulation in the lead-up to the 2020 US presidential election.

In 2022, a deep fake was released where Ukraine President Volodymyr Zelenskyy was calling for a surrender in the fight against Russia. The video shows Zelenskyy telling his soldiers to lay down their arms and surrender.

In 2024, Elon Musk shared a parody ad that cloned Kamala Harris's voice without clarifying that it was satire. A few lines from the video transcription include, "I, Kamala Harris, am your Democrat candidate for president because Joe Biden finally exposed his senility at the debate." The voice then says that Kamala is a "diversity hire" and that she has no idea about "the first thing about running the country".

In February 2025, a fabricated video of a US Immigration and Customs Enforcement (ICE) raid went viral on TikTok, negatively impacting the real-world New Jersey restaurant in which it appeared to take place. Since then, there has been a "flood" of AI-generated ICE raid and ICE protest videos online, which have received millions of views. Experts warn these videos can "undermine public trust" in real footage.

In March 2026, there was a significant increase in AI-generated misinformation regarding the US-Israel war with Iran. This was fueled by AI-generated war videos and fake satellite imagery going viral online.

=== Privacy violations ===
Deepfakes can become privacy violations, particularly in regard to nonconsensual AI-generated pornographic content.

In June 2019, a downloadable Windows and Linux application called DeepNude was released that used neural networks, specifically generative adversarial networks, to remove clothing from images of women. The app had a paid and unpaid version, with the paid version costing $50. On June 27, the creators removed the app and refunded consumers.

In September 2019, a study by Sensity showed that 96% of the 85,047 fake videos reviewed were non-consensual pornography. Most of the victims of these videos were celebrities or high-profile individuals.

Cybercriminals have used deepfake pornography to harass and extort victims "by threatening to publish it unless a ransom is paid".

=== Fraud ===
In 2019, voice cloning technology was used to successfully impersonate a chief executive's voice and demand a fraudulent transfer of €220,000. The case raised concerns about the lack of encryption methods over telephones as well as the unconditional trust often given to voice and to media in general.

In 2022, an annual report from VMware warned about deepfakes and cyber extortion, highlighting how cybercriminals were "incorporating deepfakes into their attack methods to evade security controls". The study showed that two out of three cyber security professionals noticed that deepfakes were used as part of disinformation against businesses in 2022, a 13% increase from the previous year.

Audio-visual material is typically recognized in court as accurate evidence of events regardless of whether it originates from a suspect's phone, social media, or local CCTV footage. However, the increasing prevalence of deepfakes necessitates a close examination of such evidence to verify its authenticity and identify potential manipulation.

=== Cyberattacks ===
Before 2019, an increase in cyberattacks was feared due to methods of phishing, catfishing, and social hacking being more easily automated by new technological methods.

In August 2026, Taiwan's Ministry of Digital Affairs reported it had detected AI-assisted cyberattacks on its government agencies in a "first-of-a-kind breach" that began in July.

In mid-September 2026, Spain's data protection agency reported its first personal data breach by an autonomous AI agent. Later that month, a hacker used AI agents, via DeepSeek, Moonshot's Kimi, and an older version of Anthropic's Claude, for cyberattacks on more than 100 organizations, stealing over 600,000 credit card numbers in less than a week.

== Potential uses and impacts ==
The World Economic Forum placed AI-generated misinformation and disinformation as the second most likely global risk in 2024, after extreme weather disasters. Despite this, governments and businesses continue to invest in AI because of its potential benefits for the economy and society, and they are actively developing rules to reduce risks and maximize benefits. Some examples of regulatory initiatives include the California AI Transparency Act, the TAKE IT DOWN Act, and the UK Online Safety Act 2023.

In 2024, the European Union (EU) enacted the Artificial Intelligence Act (AI Act), the first AI "ground rules" aimed at regulating AI use. The AI Act categorizes AI technologies based on risk, ranging from "unacceptable" to high, medium, and low hazard.

=== Entertainment ===
Synthetic media techniques involve generating, manipulating, and altering data to emulate creative processes on a faster and more accurate scale. Potential future hazards include addiction to personalized content and a retreat into AI-generated fantasy worlds within virtual reality.

Writing

Deep reinforcement learning-based natural-language generators could potentially be used to create advanced chatbots that could imitate natural human speech. One use case for natural-language generation is to generate or assist with writing novels and short stories, while other potential developments are that of stylistic editors to emulate professional writers.

Animation

Image synthesis tools may be able to streamline or completely automate the creation of certain aspects of visual illustrations, such as animated cartoons, comic books, and political cartoons. Because the automation process removes the need for teams of designers, artists, and others involved in the making of entertainment, costs could plunge to virtually nothing and allow for the creation of "bedroom multimedia franchises" where singular people can generate results indistinguishable from the highest budget productions for little more than the cost of running their computer. Character and scene creation tools will no longer be based on premade assets, thematic limitations, or personal skill but instead based on tweaking certain parameters and giving enough input.

TV and Movies

A combination of speech synthesis and deepfakes has been used to automatically redub an actor's speech into multiple languages without the need for reshoots or language classes. This application of synchronizing lip-movements to increase the engagement of normal dubbing is growing fast with the rise of over-the-top media (OTT) streaming.

There has been speculation about deepfakes being used for creating digital actors for future films. Digitally constructed/altered humans have already been used in films, and deepfakes could contribute new developments in the near future. Amateur deepfake technology has already been used to insert faces into existing films, such as the insertion of Harrison Ford's young face onto Han Solo's face in Solo: A Star Wars Story (2018), and techniques similar to those used by deepfakes were utilized for the acting of Princess Leia in Rogue One (2016).

Fashion and photography

GANs can be used to create photos of imaginary fashion models, with no need to hire a model, photographer, makeup artist, or pay for a studio and transportation. GANs can be used to create fashion advertising campaigns including more diverse groups of models, which may increase intent to buy among people resembling the models or family members. GANs can also be used to create portraits, landscapes and album covers. The ability for GANs to generate photorealistic human bodies presents a challenge to industries such as fashion modeling, which may be at heightened risk of being automated.

Music

Musical artists and their respective brands may also conceivably be generated from scratch, including AI-generated music, videos, interviews, and promotional material. Conversely, existing music can be altered at will, such as changing lyrics, singers, instrumentation, and composition. In 2018, using a process by WaveNet for timbre musical transfer, researchers were able to shift entire genres from one to another. Through the use of AI, old bands and artists may be "revived" to release new material without pause, which may even include "live" concerts and promotional images. The Italian music project Cantoscena used AI-generated retro songs and fictional performers to present an invented musical archive as a rediscovered catalogue. Research on the project examined how platform metadata lent credibility to its fictional recording histories.

=== News ===
News organizations have explored ways to use video synthesis and other synthetic media technologies to become more efficient and engaging. Potential future hazards include the use synthetic media to generate fake news, natural-language bot swarms generating trends and memes, and false evidence being generated.

Misinformation and distraction

Advanced text-generating bots could potentially be used to manipulate social media platforms through tactics such as astroturfing.

Natural-language generation bots mixed with image synthesis networks may theoretically be used to clog search results, filling search engines with trillions of otherwise useless but legitimate-seeming blogs, websites, and marketing spam.

=== Politics ===
A sufficiently technically competent government or community may use synthetic media to engage in a rewrite of history using various synthetic technologies, fabricating history and personalities as well as changing ways of thinking—a form of potential epistemicide. Even in otherwise rational and democratic societies, certain social and political groups may use synthetic media to craft cultural, political, and scientific filter-bubbles that greatly reduce or even altogether undermine the ability of the public to agree on basic objective facts. Conversely, the existence of synthetic media may be used to discredit factual news sources and scientific facts as "potentially fabricated."

Neural network-powered photo manipulation also has the potential to support problematic behavior of various state actors, not just totalitarian and absolutist regimes.

== See also ==
- 15.ai – Real-time text-to-speech AI tool
- Algorithmic art – Art genre
- Artificial imagination – Artificial simulation of human imagination
- Artificial intelligence art – Visual content generation through artificial intelligence
- AI slop – Low-quality AI-generated digital content
- Automated journalism – Journalism produced by algorithms
- Computational creativity – Multidisciplinary endeavour
- Computer music – Application of computing technology in music
- Cybernetic art – Contemporary art form
- DALL-E – Image-generating deep learning model
- Deepfakes – Realistic artificially generated media
- Generative adversarial network – Machine learning framework
- Generative art – Art created by a set of rules, often using computers
- Generative AI – AI that generates content
- GPT-3 – 2020 text-generating language model
- Human image synthesis – Computer generation of human images
- Text-to-image model – Machine learning model
- Text-to-video model – Machine learning model
- Transformer (machine learning model) – Algorithm for modelling sequential data
- WaveNet – Deep neural network for generating raw audio
