= Experimental Music Studios =

Organization at University of Illinois Urbana-Champaign

The Experimental Music Studios (EMS) is an organization or center for electroacoustic and computer music, focusing on synthesis and concert performance of art music, founded by Lejaren Hiller at University of Illinois at Urbana-Champaign in 1958.

The "second electronic music studio developed in the United States", and the "first formally acknowledged electro-acoustic facility in the United States" (since the Columbia-Princeton Electronic Music Center, "although formally acknowledged in 1959, had began [sic] in 1952") at an initial cost of $8,000, early equipment included an "old broadcasting studio control panel" as console, microphones, amplifiers, oscilloscopes, tape decks, and other donated items. The studios received a $30,000 grant from Magnavox in 1962, and a $53,100 grant from the National Science Foundation in 1965. Directed by Scott A. Wyatt for forty years, it is currently directed by Eli Fieldsteel, and consists of multiple studios.

Alumni include Adrian Belew, Neely Bruce, Herbert Brün, Mary Ellen Childs, Insook Choi, Donnacha Dennehy, Robert Fleisher, Mara Helmuth, Elizabeth Hinkle-Turner, Ben Johnston, Salvatore Martirano, Larry Polansky, David Rosenboom, Carla Scaletti, James Tenney, David Ward-Steinman, David Weinstein, and Olly Wilson. Composers who worked at the center between 1958 and 1975 include John Cage, Michael Colgrass, Kenneth Gaburo, Charles Hamm, and John Melby.

Hiller created the MUSICOMP ("MUsic SImulator-Interpreter for COMpositional Procedures") programming language for music composition with Robert Baker in order to create their Computer Cantata (1963) at the studios. MUSICOMP was used by Brün in generating his Non Sequitur VI (1966). Composer James Beauchamp developed the Harmonic Tone Generator (a form of additive synthesis) at the studios.

== See also ==
- HPSCHD
- Illiac Suite
