= Scott Alan Wyatt =

American composer (born 1951)

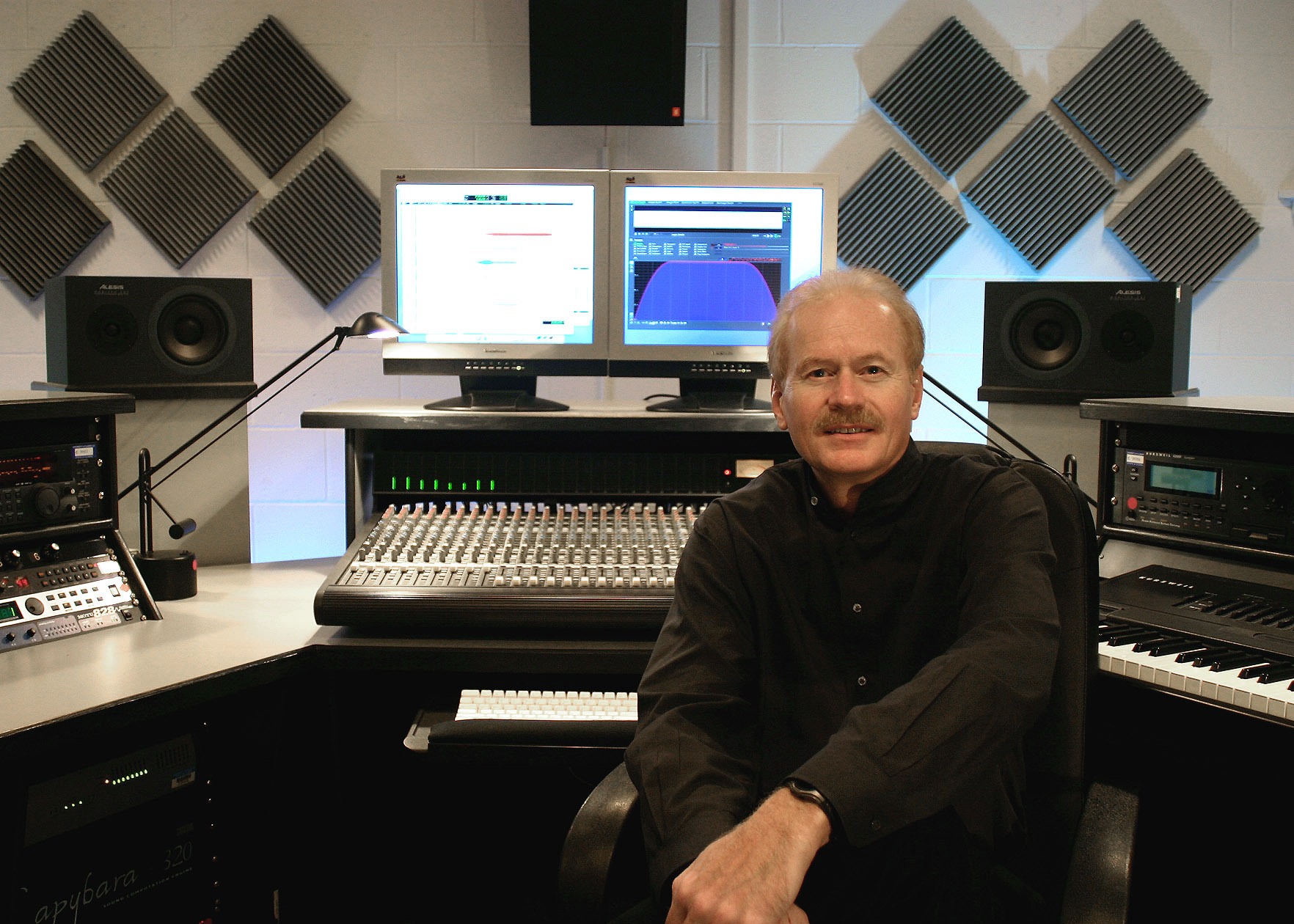
Scott A. Wyatt in Studio D of the Experimental Music Studios at the University of Illinois at Urbana-Champaign (2013)

Scott Alan Wyatt (born 1951 in Philadelphia, Pennsylvania), composing music as Scott A. Wyatt, is a composer of electroacoustic music. He is currently professor emeritus of Music Composition at the University of Illinois at Urbana-Champaign, having served as Director of the university's Experimental Music Studios for 40 years. Wyatt also served as President of the Society for Electro-Acoustic Music in the United States (SEAMUS) from 1989 through 1996, and is the recipient of the 2018 SEAMUS Award. Wyatt's compositions include purely electroacoustic music, as well as live performance compositions for instruments with electroacoustic accompaniment. His compositions for live instrument performance with electroacoustic accompaniment are published by Cimarron Music Press (Tuba Euphonium Press) and Media Press Music.

== Music ==
Composer Ben Johnston, in his liner notes to Wyatt's album Collections I: Electronic Music with and without Instruments, referred to Wyatt as belonging to "the third generation of electronic music composers," being less concerned with experimentation for experimentation's sake and choosing to focus more on the potential of incorporating electronically generated and processed sounds in serious composition. Wyatt describes his own compositional approach as "gestural", in that he constructs linear sonic events that allow "the listener a desired opportunity to discover the interplay and development of molded sonic events without the interference of pitch as the primary factor." He asserts that clarity in motivic gestures and their evolutionary development enhances the drive, direction, and drama of a piece. While many of his early electroacoustic works employ sounds derived from synthesizers such as those developed by Moog and Buchla, Wyatt has since shifted to the musique concrète approach of utilizing found sounds. Wyatt records all of his sonic material in a studio in order to have complete control over the sculpting process, finding the exploration of the inherent gestural potential of a sound "revealing" and "exciting". His compositional output is generally fast-paced and avoids prolonged periods of stasis.

Notable is his attention to spatialization within his works. Wyatt opts for a manual approach to achieve effective, convincing translations—"the perceived movement of the location of a sound source"—across a multichannel field, finding it easier to emphasize such movement than by using multichannel panner utilities. To this end, Wyatt devised the D-8, or Discrete Eight, System, consisting of three stereo pairs of speakers (front, side, and back) with front and back center speakers. This setup allows for the accurate reproduction and longitudinal rolling of stereo images while still allowing for effective translations of sounds in a circular fashion. The D-8 System's speaker and channel placement is intentionally compatible with the audio industry's commercial 5.1 channel and 8.1 channel audio formats. Wyatt is also known for making use of terminology, specific to electroacoustic music, that serve as analogues to traditional compositional devices. For instance, while the terms section and phrase remain consistent with how they are employed in traditional analytical models, he uses the terms gesture and event as alternatives to motive and note, respectively.

== Biography ==
Wyatt studied classical piano as a child, though in high school began "living a double life of playing keyboards and bass in rock bands," learning to build his own amplifiers and speaker cabinets as his family did not have the money to afford them. While an avid enthusiast of both technology and music, he was only vaguely aware of synthesizers through their occasional appearance in the commercial music industry. As a freshman studying music education and piano performance at West Chester University in 1970, Wyatt was presented with the opportunity to work with a new Moog Series 900 synthesizer, though the user documentation from Moog Music was not in a user-friendly form. Due to his experience with building his own electronic music equipment and performing in bands, Wyatt was able to fully explore the capabilities of the instrument and write a manual for West Chester faculty and students to use. It was during this time that Wyatt came to know the music of composers such as Milton Babbitt, John Cage, Edgard Varèse, and Iannis Xenakis, and was immediately drawn to it. This led him to seek composition lessons under John Melby and Larry Nelson.

After graduating from West Chester University, Wyatt was admitted to the University of Illinois at Urbana-Champaign in 1974 as a graduate student, reuniting with and once again studying under John Melby (who had joined the university's composition division faculty the previous year). Wyatt was also a student of Herbert Brün, Ben Johnston, Salvatore Martirano, and Paul Zonn. Wyatt was quickly hired on as a lecturer the following year, teaching music theory, aural skills, and an electronic music course. He also served that year as co-director of the Experimental Music Studios alongside faculty member James Beauchamp, assuming sole directorship in 1976. Wyatt would continue to direct the Experimental Music Studios until 2016.

In addition to his duties at the University of Illinois, Wyatt has been an active figure in the Society for Electro-Acoustic Music in the United States (SEAMUS), serving as its president from 1989 through 1996 and on its Board of Directors until 2016.

Wyatt has been the recipient of many awards and honors throughout his career. He was one of the winning participants of the 1978 International Society for Contemporary Music National Composers Competition, the 1979 National Flute Association Composition Competition, and the 1979 Concorso Internazionale Luigi Russolo Composition Competition. He won the International Confederation of Electro-Acoustic Music GRAND PRIZE in the 1984 International Electro-Acoustic Music Competition in Bourges, France, and emerged as a finalist in the 1989 Bourges Competition. Wyatt has also received recognition and funding for advancements in the field of electroacoustic music composition, including an Arnold Beckman Research Award in 1990 for the development of digital timescaling applications, and various grants from 1996 through 2011 for the development of an eight-channel sound diffusion methodology. In 2008, he was awarded a Fine and Applied Arts Creative Research Award for the production of Risky Business: a tribute to Nikola Tesla, a composition featuring two 900,000-volt Tesla Coils. He has also successfully pursued many university grants for digital image processing, a 1994 Educational Technologies Assistance Grant, and several university-sponsored special projects grants for course development. On 7 December 2017, SEAMUS announced that Scott Wyatt will be honored with the 2018 SEAMUS Award, an accolade that "acknowledges the important contributions of its recipients to the field of electro-acoustic music."

== Recordings ==
- 2017. Music from SEAMUS volume 26. SEAMUS Records EAM-2017
  - Includes Scott A. Wyatt: ...and nature is alone.
- 2012. Music from SEAMUS volume 21. SEAMUS Records EAM-2010
  - Includes Scott A. Wyatt: ComLinks.
- 2009. SEAMUS DVD ONE.
  - Includes Scott A. Wyatt: All at Risk.
- 2008. In Celebration of the 50th Anniversary of the University of Illinois Experimental Music Studios. University of Illinois EMS-2008
  - Includes Scott A. Wyatt: of gray twilight.
- 2008. Music from SEAMUS volume 17. SEAMUS Records EAM-2008.
  - Includes Scott A. Wyatt: A Road Beyond.
- 2006. Radial Matrix, multi-dimensional electroacoustic music by James Dashow, Richard Karpen, and Scott A. Wyatt. Capstone Records CPS-8769.
  - Includes Scott A. Wyatt: In the Arms of Peril.
  - Includes Scott A. Wyatt: Time Mark.
  - Includes Scott A. Wyatt: On a Roll.
- 2005. Music from SEAMUS volume 14. SEAMUS Records EAM-2005.
  - Includes Scott A. Wyatt: On a Roll.
- 2003. Music from SEAMUS volume 12. SEAMUS Records EAM-2003.
  - Includes Scott A. Wyatt: Night Visitors.
- 2002. Music from SEAMUS volume 11. SEAMUS Records EAM-2002.
  - Includes Scott A. Wyatt: In the Arms of Peril.
- 2001. IMEB (Groupe International Musique Electroacoustique de Bourges) Electronic Culture Recording Series volume 15. IMEB LCD-278074/75.
  - Includes Scott A. Wyatt: All for One. Tom Siwe, percussion.
- 1999. Music from SEAMUS volume 8. SEAMUS Records EAM-9901.
  - Includes Scott A. Wyatt: Private Play.
- 1998. Perantoni Plays Perantoni. Mark Records MCD-2433.
  - Includes Scott A. Wyatt: Three for One. Daniel Perantoni, tuba.
- 1997. Music from SEAMUS volume 7. SEAMUS Records EAM-9701.
  - Includes Scott A. Wyatt: A Time of Being. University of Illinois Concert Choir. Chester L. Alwes, conductor. Elaine Gary, percussion.
- 1996. Light of Sothis by Debra Richtmeyer. Mark Records MCD-1806.
  - Includes Scott A. Wyatt: Counterpoints. Debra Richtmeyer, soprano saxophone.
- 1994. Music from SEAMUS volume 3. SEAMUS Records EAM-9402.
  - Includes Scott A. Wyatt: Counterpoints. Debra Richtmeyer, soprano saxophone.
- 1994. Music from SEAMUS volume 2. SEAMUS Records EAM-9401.
  - Includes Scott A. Wyatt: Time Mark. Glenn Schaft, percussion.
- 1987. Collections II Chamber Music with electronics. VERIATZ Records V-892.
  - Includes Scott A. Wyatt: Soundets.
  - Includes Scott A. Wyatt: Real Illusion.
  - Includes Scott A. Wyatt: Four For Flute.
  - Includes Scott A. Wyatt: Vignettes.
  - Includes Scott A. Wyatt: Time Mark.
- 1987. Beyond the Lines, crossings without drums by Scott A. Wyatt. OFFICE Records FIL-300.
  - Includes Scott A. Wyatt: Circulation.
  - Includes Scott A. Wyatt: Garden Music.
  - Includes Scott A. Wyatt: Inquiry.
  - Includes Scott A. Wyatt: Distant Fields.
  - Includes Scott A. Wyatt: Poems.
  - Includes Scott A. Wyatt: Solace Affair.
  - Includes Scott A. Wyatt: Time Between Seconds.
  - Includes Scott A. Wyatt: Catwalk.
  - Includes Scott A. Wyatt: Until....
- 1986. CDCM Computer Music Series volume 3. CENTAUR Records CRC-2045.
  - Includes Scott A. Wyatt: Still Hidden Laughs.
- 1985. Chamber Music. VERIATZA Records V-861.
  - Includes Scott A. Wyatt: All for One. Tom Siwe, percussion.
- 1983. In Celebration of the 25th Anniversary of the University of Illinois Experimental Music Studios. University of Illinois, Library of Congress LC-84-743210.
  - Includes Scott A. Wyatt: Trans.
- 1981. Tuba N' Spice. Mark Records MRS-37879.
  - Includes Scott A. Wyatt: Three for One. Daniel Perantoni, tuba.
- 1978. Collections I. UBRES Records CS-303.
  - Includes Scott A. Wyatt: Four For Flute. John Fonville, flute.
  - Includes Scott A. Wyatt: Menagerie.
  - Includes Scott A. Wyatt: Two plus Two. Tom Siwe and Don Baker, percussion.

== Articles ==
- Wyatt, Scott A. "Investigative Studies on Sound Diffusion/Projection", eContact! 2.4 (September 1999). . Retrieved 2017-12-12.
- Wyatt, Scott A. "Gestural Composition", eContactI 1.2 (March 1998). Retrieved 2017-12-12.
- Wyatt, Scott A. "Challenge of the New", Computer and Music Educator Journal, vol. 1, no. 3 (March 1990): 7–8.
- Wyatt, Scott A. "Electro-Acoustic Music: Giving Voice to New Sounds", Mechanical Engineering Magazine, vol. 108, no. 9 (September 1986): 58–62.
