= Kenneth Gaburo =

American composer

Kenneth Louis Gaburo
- Born: 5 July 1926; Somerville, New Jersey, U.S.
- Died: 26 January 1993 (aged 66); Iowa City, Iowa, U.S.
- Occupations: Composer, Music educator
- Known for: Pioneer in electronic music; “compositional linguistics”; works combining voice, language, electronics

Kenneth Louis Gaburo (July 5, 1926 – January 26, 1993) was an American composer.

== Life ==
Gaburo was born in Somerville, New Jersey. He served as a professor of music at the University of Illinois, the University of California, San Diego, and the University of Iowa. His notable students include Louise Spizizen, James Tenney, Betty Ann Wong, and Allen Strange. He is renowned as a teacher, pioneer of electronics in music, jazz pianist, writer, ecologist, publisher, and proponent of compositional linguistics.

In 1968, he joined the faculty at the new San Diego campus of the University of California where in 1972 a Rockefeller Foundation grant enabled him to start NMCE IV, this time with an actor, a virtuoso speaker, a mime, a gymnast, and a sound-movement artist. Until his resignation from UCSD in 1975 he produced a large number of integrated theatrical works, such as the collection Lingua and Privacy.

In 1975, Gaburo founded Lingua Press, which produces scores, books, records, audio tapes, videotapes, and films. This firm is dedicated to putting forth unique artist-produced works in all media having to do with language and music. Many of the publications have been exhibited in book art shows throughout the world. Gaburo lived in the Anzo-Borrego desert writing and teaching from 1980 until 1983. In 1980, he was artistic director for the first "authentic" production of Harry Partch's The Bewitched for the Berlin Festival (recorded on Enclosure Five: Harry Partch, innova 405). His understanding of Partch's concept of corporeality has deep connections with his own concern for physicality and how it informs compositions. His 1982 tape work, RE-RUN, for instance, was generated after a 20-hour sensory deprivation exercise.

He became Director of the Experimental Music Studio at the University of Iowa in 1983. The studio put intensive focus on composition, technology, psycho-acoustic perception, performance, and the affirmation of the uniqueness of the individual to create his/her own language reality. At the studio, he founded the Seminar for Cognitive Studies, a forum for discussion of the creative process. His concern for the investigation of music as legitimate research, and composition as the creation of intrinsic appropriate language, led to a series of readings in compositional linguistics for solo performer. One such piece is "PENTAGON/Y" (1986) was published in The Act.

He most often made innovative use of electronics and explored tonality, serialism, and what he called "compositional linguistics" such as in his LINGUA series. He also wrote minimal pieces such as The Flow of (u) for three voices singing unison.

Gaburo died in 1993 in Iowa City, Iowa, aged 66.

The archive of his life's work is held at the University of Illinois Music Library.

== Discography ==
- Kenneth Gaburo: Five Works for Voices, Instruments, and Electronics (2002). New World Records 80585-2. Featuring:
1. Antiphony IV (Poised) (1967)
2. String Quartet in One Movement (1956)
3. Mouth-Piece: Sextet for Solo Trumpet (1970)
4. Antiphony III (Pearl-white moments) (1962)
5. The Flow of (u) (1974)
