= Herbert Brün =

Herbert Brün (July 9, 1918 – November 6, 2000) was a composer and cybernetician. Born in Berlin, Germany, he taught at the University of Illinois Urbana-Champaign from 1962 until he retired several years before his death. He was a pioneer of electronic and computer music, incorporating ideas from cybernetics into his work.

== Career ==
Brün left Germany in 1936 to study piano and composition at the Jerusalem Conservatory in Mandatory Palestine with Stefan Wolpe, Eli Friedman and Frank Pelleg. While in Palestine, he also worked as a jazz pianist. In 1948, he received a scholarship to further his studies in the United States at Tanglewood and Columbia University through 1950.

His work in electronic music began in Paris in the late 1950s, followed by work at the Westdeutscher Rundfunk Studio for Electronic Music in Cologne and the Siemens studio in Munich. During the 1950s, he also worked as composer and conductor of music for the theater, gave lectures and seminars emphasizing the function of music in society, and did a series of broadcasts on contemporary music.

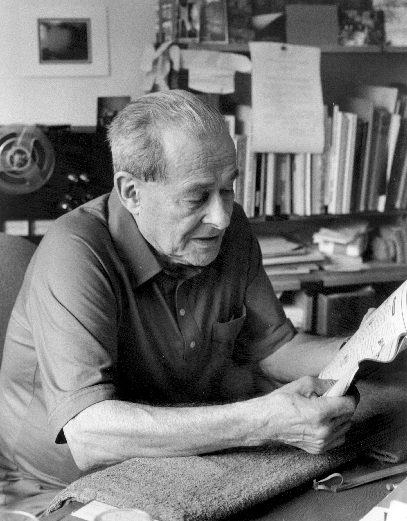
Herbert Brün in his studio (1995)

After a lecture tour of the United States in 1962, he was invited by composer Lejaren Hiller to join the University of Illinois Center for Advanced Computation in 1963-64, at the conclusion of which he was asked to stay on as a member of the faculty. In Illinois, Brün began research on composition with computers, which resulted in pieces for tape and instruments, tape alone, and graphics. His compositions from this period include Futility 1964 (1964) and Non Sequitur VI (1966). Non Sequitur VI was generated using the MUSICOMP programming language developed by Hiller and Robert Baker at the Experimental Music Studios.

Brün began programming in Fortran in the late 1960s as he pursued an interest in designing processes. This work resulted in Infraudibles (1968) and mutatis mutandis (1968). The latter was a series of computer-generated graphic scores.

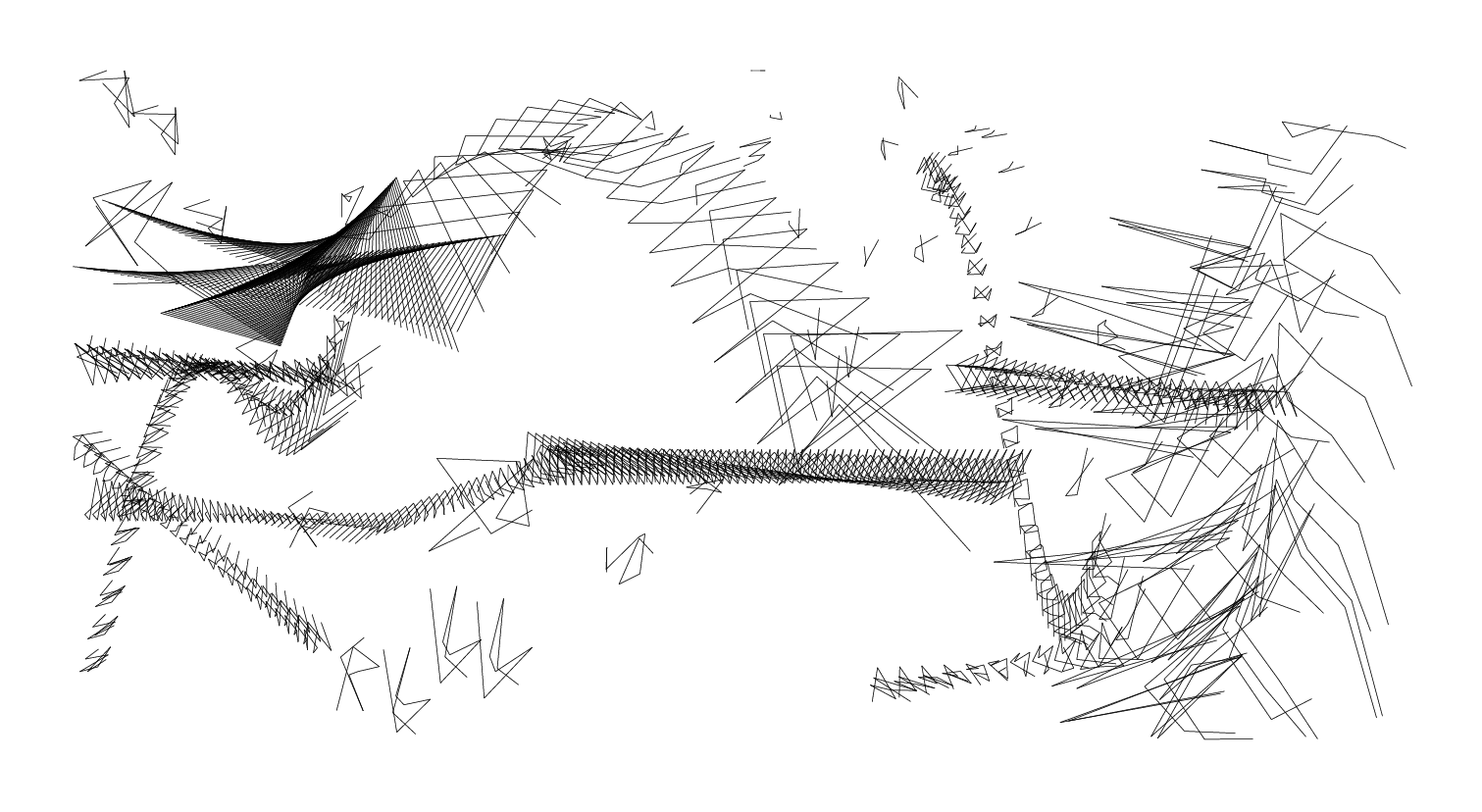
series: mutatis mutandis 242; random seed: 540802

From 1968–74, he co-taught courses at the University of Illinois' Biological Computer Laboratory with Heinz von Foerster on cybernetics, heuristics, composition, cognition, and social change. In 1974, the members of the class published the book The Cybernetics of Cybernetics.

In 1972, Brün created a new synthesis technique which generated new timbres by linking and merging tiny portions of waveforms. (Efforts along similar lines are described in the article Granular synthesis.) From 1980 on, he toured and taught with the Performers' Workshop Ensemble, a group he founded.

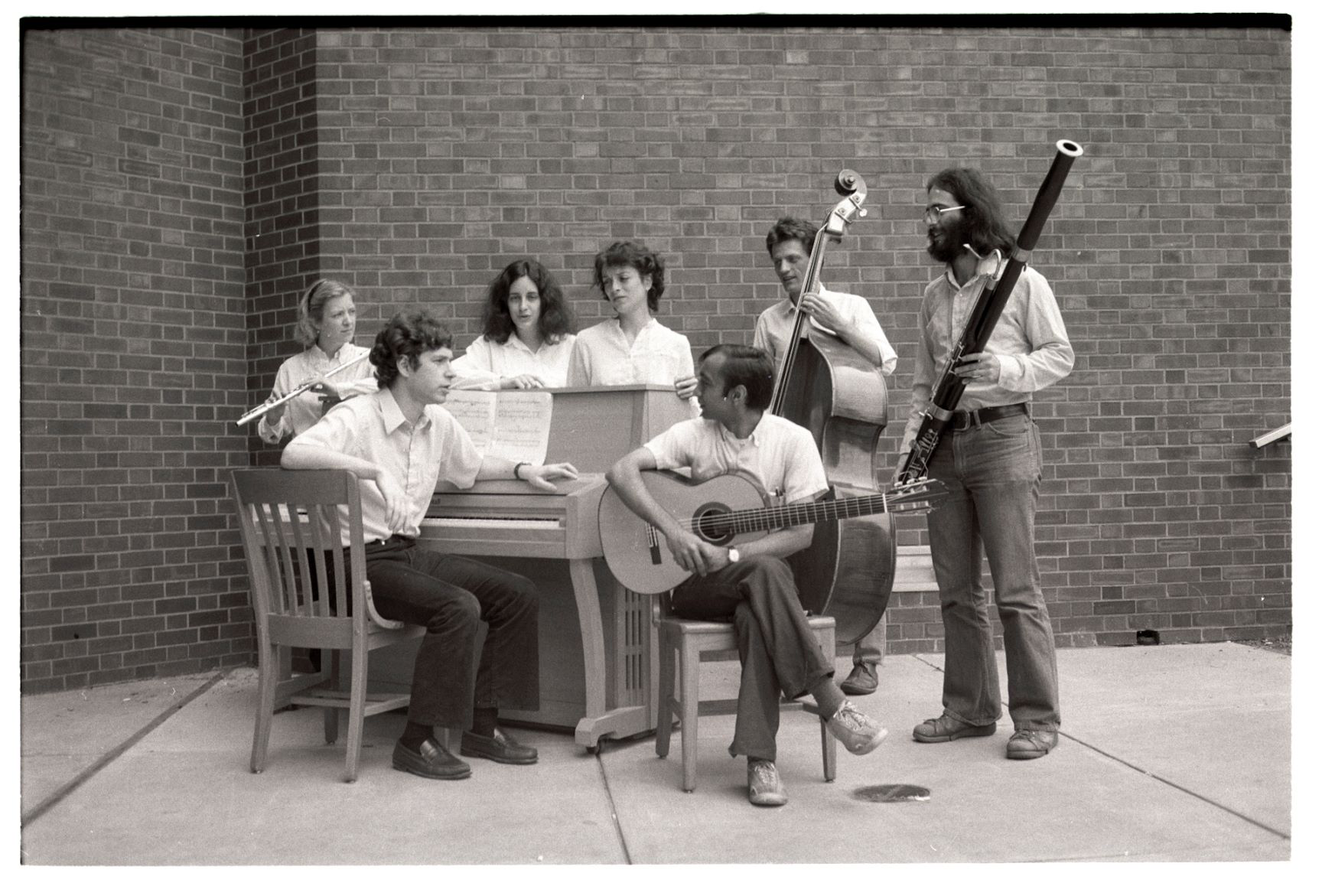
The Performers Workshop Ensemble. Left to right: Lesley Olson, Sam Magrill, Pam Richman, Susan Parenti, Arun Chandra, Mark Sullivan, Mark Enslin

Brün was instrumental in helping the then fledgling Computer Music Association get started in the middle 1970s, helping host conferences at the University of Illinois in 1975, and again in 1987. He was invited to give the keynote address at their annual conference in 1985.

Brün was awarded an honorary doctorate from the Goethe University Frankfurt (1999) and the Norbert Wiener medal from the American Society for Cybernetics in 1993. He helped found the School for Designing a Society in 1993 and taught there through the year 2000. His awards and honors also include the SEAMUS Award for Lifelong Achievement (2000), and a prize from the International Society of Bassists (1977). In 1969, he was Distinguished Visiting Professor at Ohio State University. He was one of two participants from the United States invited by UNESCO to their symposium Music and Technology (1970). He was Guest Professor invited jointly by the Hochschule der Künste and the Technische Universität Berlin (1978); Composer in residence at the University of Maryland, Baltimore (May 1982); Composer in Residence at the University of Missouri (Kansas City) (1983); and Guest Composer at the annual convention of the Percussive Arts Society, St. Louis (1987).

Brün's students at the University of Illinois were referred to, often pejoratively, as "Brünettes". His notable students include Stuart Saunders Smith and Sarah Hennies.

== Life ==
Herbert Brün was born to a German Jewish family in Berlin. Many of his relatives died in the Holocaust during World War II.

He was married to Marianne Brün, an intellectual, writer, and teacher of social theory; she was the daughter of the famous German actors Fritz Kortner and Johanna Hofer.

== Selected works ==
- Five Pieces for piano, Op.1 (1940–45)
- Sonatina for viola alone, Op.12 (1950)
- String Quartet No.2 (1957)
- Anepigraphe (1958) (tape alone)
- Klange unterwegs ('Wayfaring Sounds') (1962) (tape alone)
- Trio, for flute, double-bass, and percussion (1964)
- Futility 1964 (tape alone)
- Sonoriferous Loops (1964) (chamber ensemble and tape)
- Infraudibles (1968/1984) (optional chamber ensemble and tape)
- Piece of Prose (1972) (tape alone)
- Dust (1976) (SAWDUST No. 1) (tape alone)
- More Dust (1977) (SAWDUST No. 2) (optional percussion and tape)
- Dustiny (1978) (SAWDUST No. 3) (tape alone)
- A Mere Ripple (1979) (SAWDUST No. 4) (tape alone)
- U-TURN-TO (1980) (SAWDUST No. 5) (tape alone)
- I toLD YOU so! (1981) (SAWDUST No. 6) (tape alone)
- Sentences Now Open Wide (SNOW) (1984)
- on stilts among ducks (1996) (viola and tape)

== Publications ==
- Brün, Herbert. Über Musik und zum Computer. Karlsruhe: G. Braun, 1971. Accompanied by a 10-inch LP recording.
- Computer-generated graphics. Computer Music Journal, Vol. 5, No. 2, summer, 1981.
- Brün, Herbert. My Words and Where I Want Them. Champaign, IL; London: Princelet Editions, 1990. ISBN 0-86298-028-3
- Brün, Herbert. Irresistible Observations, edited by Mark Enslin, Susan Parenti, Andrew Trull. Champaign, IL: Non Sequitur Press. ISBN 0-9662448-6-9
- Brün, Herbert. Sighs in Disguise, edited by Mark Enslin, Susan Parenti, Andrew Trull. Champaign, IL: Non Sequitur Press. ISBN 0-9662448-5-0
- Brün, Herbert. When Music Resists Meaning: The Major Writings of Herbert Brün, edited by Arun Chandra. Middletown, CT: Wesleyan University Press, 2004. ISBN 0-8195-6669-1 (cloth) ISBN 0-8195-6670-5 (pbk.)

== Citations ==
=== References ===
- Chandra, Arun, ed. (2004). When Music Resists Meaning: The Major Writings of Herbert Brün. Wesleyan University Press. ISBN 9780819566690. OCLC 474495643.ISBN 0-8195-6669-1 (cloth), ISBN 0-8195-6670-5 (paperback), LCCN 2003-66582
- Enslin, Mark (2001). "Brün, Herbert". In Sadie, Stanley; Tyrrell, John (eds.). The New Grove Dictionary of Music and Musicians. Vol. 4 (2 ed.). Macmillan Publishers Limited. pp. 499–500. doi:10.1093/gmo/9781561592630.article.48268. LCCN 2012002055. OCLC 5713602733.ISBN 0-3336-0800-3, 1-5615-9239-0
- Gluck, Robert J. (2006). "Electronic Music in Israel". Electronic Music Foundation. Archived from the original on 2009-07-26.
- "History of EMS". School of Music, University of Illinois at Urbana-Champaign.
- Kowalkowski, Jeffrey (Summer 2008). "Techniques for Thwarting Hegemony: Anticommunication and Gesture-Inhibiting Musical Material as Compositional Resource in the Music of Herbert Brün". Perspectives of New Music. 46 (2): 237–243. doi:10.1353/pnm.2008.0005. ISSN 0031-6016. JSTOR 25652394. OCLC 6733252229. S2CID 258132700.
- "Marianne Brün (obituary)". The News-Gazette.
