= Ilza Nogueira =

Brazilian composer and musicologist (born 1948)

Ilza Nogueira (born December 25, 1948) is a Brazilian composer, music educator and musicologist with specialty in the area of music analysis.

== Biography ==
Ilza Nogueira was born in Salvador, Bahia. She studied composition under Ernst Widmer at the School of Music and Performing Arts of the Federal University of Bahia. After graduation in 1972, she won a scholarship from the German Academic Exchange Service (DAAD) and continued her studies in composition at the Academy of Music in Cologne (1974–1977) with Mauricio Kagel. She also obtained Master of Arts (1983) and Doctor of Philosophy (1985) degrees from the State University of New York at Buffalo (USA), where she studied under Lejaren Hiller and Morton Feldman. After completing her undergraduate studies, she took a position teaching music at the Federal University of Paraíba where she retired from the faculty in 1998.

The majority of her compositions are in chamber music with a predilection for mixed groupings with voice. Her works have been included in all recognized venues of contemporary music in Brazil, such as the Biennial of Contemporary Brazilian Music, Encounters of Latin American Composers and Performers, International Encounters of Female Composers, Panorama of Brazilian Music Now and the Festival Virtuosi.

Nogueira is a senior scholar of the National Counsel for Scientific and Technological Development (CNPq) and a Member of the Brazilian Academy of Music (holding chair n. 27). As a musicologist, Nogueira writes books, articles and critical reviews on contemporary music, focusing on Bahian composers. Her research project “Historical Landmarks of Contemporary Composition in Bahia” runs three series of publications: 1) critical editions accompanied by analytical essays; 2) theoretical essays accompanied by critical reviews; 3) web catalogues.

In November 2014 she founded the Brazilian Society for Music Theory and Analysis - TeMA and was elected its first President (2014-2018). Her Curriculum Vitae may be accessed at.

== Works ==
Works include:

- SEIS EPITÁFIOS PARA ARNOLD (2024, a free adaptation of Schoenberg's Op. 19), for violin and piano.
- TRAJETÓRIAS (2022), for solo flute.
- CANTARES DA VELHA BAHIA (2020), for string orchestra (1st position).
- BRASIL, 1959: SERESTA, CHORO E FREVO PARA VILLA (2019/2022/2024), for viola and piano.
- INTERFACES (2010-2011), for piano.
- REMINISCÊNCIAS (2006), for soprano solo (text by W. Whitman).
- MEMÓRIAS (1993/2009), for flute (C and G), piano and violoncello.
- SUÍTE OPARA (2005), for woodwind quintet.
- VIA-SACRA: ORATÓRIO DE SEMANA SANTA (2004), for orchestra, chorus, solo voices (Libretto by W. J. Solha).
- AINDA QUE ... (2002), for soprano and harp (text of the Catholic Liturgy: I Corinthians, 13).
- PRECE (2002), for chorus a cappella (text by the composer).
- SERENATA ICONOCLASTA (2001), for orchestra and choir (text by Augusto dos Anjos).
- CANTATA GONZAGUEANA (1999-2000), for tenor soloist, mixed chorus and orchestra, based on the repertoire of popular northeastern singer Luiz Gonzaga.
- ACOMPANHAMENTOS AO PIANO PARA TRÊS CANÇÕES DE NINAR DO FOLCLORE MUSICADO DA BAHIA (1997), for soprano and piano.
- CINCO CANÇÕES DA CAMERA (1997), for soprano and mixed ensemble (on poetic texts and music by Ernst Widmer).
- ODE AOS JAMAIS ILUMINADOS (1993), for string quartet, piano, and two narrators (text derived from poems by Mário de Andrade).
- IN MEMORIAM (1988), for soprano and percussion (text by Thiago de Mello "Botão de Rosa")
- URTEXT (1985), for soprano solo, baritone solo, woodwind quartet, string quartet and percussion.
- TRANSFORMS (1985), for sax quartet and magnetic tape.
- KALEIDOSCOPE (1983), for two brass ensembles.
- TRILOQUIA (1977), for mixed ensemble.
- CROMOSSONS (1977), for three pre-recorded orchestras and slides projection.
- LUDOS CROMÁTICOS (1973): N.º 1, for non-specific ensemble; N.º 2, for keyboard; N.º 3, for corporal expression.
- IDIOSSINCRASIA (1972), for seven violins, ronda (Smetak instrument), percussion, tape, voices, and synthesizer (includes dance - pas de trois).
- METÁSTASE (1971), for chorus a cappella.
- TRÊS ROTEIROS PARA IMPROVISAÇÃO (1970).
- PEÇA PARA QUARTETO DE FLAUTAS BLOCK (1969), for recorder quartet.

== Books ==
Nogueira has published books, chapters and musicological articles.

- Nogueira, Ilza. Ernst Widmer: Perfil estilístico. Salvador: Escola de Música da UFBA, 1997, 198 p.
- Nogueira, Ilza. Ernst Widmer: Catálogo de Obras. Rio de Janeiro: Academia Brasileira de Música, 2007, 231 p.
