= The Flow of (u) =

Piece of music composed in 1974 by Kenneth Gaburo

The Flow of (u) is a piece of music for three voices by Kenneth Gaburo, composed in 1974.

The piece consists of "one note sung by three singers for twenty-three minutes" on u whose goal is "to sing in tune to such an extent that … this would consist of phase-coherent waves of sound." This, however, proves impossible, as singers must breathe, beating occurs between nearly in tune pitches, and the frequency spectrum or harmonics: "Gently changing balances between the voices would result in very subtle glissandi of the harmonics of the spectrum being heard." The piece creates a "(sonic) universe in this (linguistic) 'grain of sand'".

Unlike other minimalist works in which, compared to serial music, "a certain level of articulational subtlety is eschewed in favor of an overall psycho-acoustic effect," in Gaburo's piece "the focus is even more intense, and the attention to dynamic shaping given to the lines … is here transferred to the micro-level".

An earlier work from Gaburo's Lingua series, Lingua IV (1970), for various media, bears a similar subtitle: "The Flow of (i)2".
