= Margaret Scoville =

American composer of chamber, electronic and piano music

Margaret Lee Scoville (3 May 1944 - 1978) was an American composer of chamber, electronic and piano music.

Scoville was born in Pasadena, California. She studied music at the State University of New York, Buffalo, where she participated in the university's Evenings for New Music as a Creative Associate Graduate Fellow and composer. Her teachers included Morton Feldman, Ramon Fuller, Lejaren Hiller, and William Kothe.

Scoville's piano pieces were recorded by George Skipworth on LP EDUCO 3097.

== Chamber ==
- Ephemerae (violin, two viola and cello)
- Fading, Still Fading (flute, viola and piano)
- Lament on the Death of Proposition 15 (two flutes and oboe)
- Time Out of Mind (two percussion)

== Electronic ==
- Electric Sunday (magnetic tape)
- Number 9 (tape)
- Thirteen Ways of Looking at a Blackbird (chamber ensemble and tape)

== Piano ==
- Ostinato, Fantasy and Fugue
- Pentacycle

== Vocal ==
- “Four Fragments from Empedocles” (soprano, flute and piano)
