= Leonard Isaacson =

American chemist and composer (1925–2018)

Leonard Maxwell Isaacson (December 15, 1925 – July 1, 2018) was an American chemist and composer.

Isaacson was born in Chicago, Illinois on December 15, 1925. He collaborated with Lejaren Hiller on the computer-programmed acoustic composition, Illiac Suite (1957). At the time, both composers were professors at the University of Illinois at Urbana–Champaign, and used the university's room-size ILLIAC I. He died in Belvedere Tiburon, California on July 1, 2018, at the age of 92.

== Bibliography ==
- Hiller, Lejaren A., and Leonard M. Issacson. (1959/1979). Experimental Music: Composition With an Electronic Computer. McGraw-Hill, New York. ISBN 978-0-313-22158-3.
