= Insook Choi =

Korean-American composer

Insook Choi (born 1962, in South Korea) is a Korean-American composer. She is the developer of the Scoregraph program.

== Compositions ==
- Lit (1992), for tape, released on The Composer in the Computer Age-IV
- Unfolding Time in Manifold (1996), with Machine Child
- Coney Island (1999), with Machine Child
- Voices in Ruins (2000), with Machine Child
