= Lejaren Hiller =

American composer

Lejaren Arthur Hiller Jr. (February 23, 1924 – January 26, 1994) was an American composer, computer scientist, and chemist.

== Career ==
Hiller was born on February 23, 1924, in New York City. His father, Lejaren Hiller Sr., was a well-known art photographer who specialized in historical tableaux. As a child, Lejaren Jr. played piano, oboe, clarinet, and saxophone. While earning a degree in chemistry at Princeton University, he also studied composition with Roger Sessions and Milton Babbitt. From 1947 to 1952, he worked as a research chemist for DuPont in Waynesboro, Virginia, where he developed the first reliable process for dyeing Orlon acrylic fiber and coauthored a popular textbook.

In 1957, he collaborated with Leonard Isaacson on his Illiac Suite, the first significant work of computer-based algorithmic composition, which was realized using the ILLIAC I computer at the University of Illinois Urbana-Champaign. He wrote an article on the Illiac Suite for Scientific American which garnered controversy. Hiller was met with hostility from the musical establishment; both Baker's Biographical Dictionary of Musicians and The New Grove Dictionary of Music and Musicians refused to include him until shortly before his death.

A majority of Hiller's works after 1957 do not involve computers at all, but might include stochastic music, indeterminacy, serialism, Brahmsian traditionalism, jazz, performance art, folk song and counterpoint mixed together. In 1958, Hiller founded the Experimental Music Studios at the University of Illinois. He created the MUSICOMP ("MUsic SImulator-Interpreter for COMpositional Procedures") programming language for music composition with Robert Baker in order to create their Computer Cantata (1963). He also collaborated with John Cage for the composition and multimedia event HPSCHD (1969).

In 1968, he joined the faculty at the University at Buffalo as Slee Professor of Composition, where he established the school's first computer music facility, co-directed with Lukas Foss, at the Center of the Creative and Performing Arts. Illness forced him to retire in 1989.

His notable pupils include James Fulkerson, Larry Lake, Ilza Nogueira, David Rosenboom, Margaret Scoville, Michael Ranta, Elliott Sharp, Bernadette Speach, and James Tenney.

Hiller died from Alzheimer's disease on January 26, 1994, in Buffalo, New York.

== Bibliography ==
Hiller wrote three books:

- Hiller, Lejaren A., and Leonard M. Issacson. (1959/1979). Experimental Music: Composition With an Electronic Computer. McGraw-Hill, New York. ISBN 978-0-313-22158-3.
- Hiller, Lejaren and Herber, Rolfe H. (1960). Principles of Chemistry.
- Hiller, Lejaren (1964). Informationstheorie und Computermusik. (in German)

== See also ==
- See: List of music students by teacher: G to J#Lejaren Hiller.
