= Illiac Suite =

1957 music composition

Illiac Suite (later retitled String Quartet No. 4) is a 1957 composition for string quartet which is generally agreed to be the first score composed by an electronic computer. Lejaren Hiller, in collaboration with Leonard Isaacson, programmed the ILLIAC I computer at the University of Illinois Urbana-Champaign (where both composers were professors) to generate compositional material, marking an early use of algorithmic composition.

The piece consists of four movements, corresponding to four experiments: the first is about the generation of cantus firmi; the second generates four-voice segments with various rules; the third deals with rhythm, dynamics, and playing instructions; and the fourth with Markov chains.
