= John Melby =

American composer

John Melby (born 1941) is an American composer.

== Life and work ==
John Melby is most widely known for his numerous compositions for computer-synthesized sounds, particularly in combination with live acoustic instruments. In addition to electronic music, Melby's catalog includes many acoustic chamber, vocal, and orchestral works. Since 2010, he has focused almost exclusively on writing acoustic music for chamber ensembles and symphony orchestra.

Born in Whitehall, Wisconsin, Melby holds degrees from the Curtis Institute of Music, the University of Pennsylvania, and Princeton University. He studied with Henry Weinberg, George Crumb, Peter Westergaard, J. K. Randall, and Milton Babbitt. Melby has held faculty positions at West Chester University and was appointed to the faculty of the School of Music of the University of Illinois at Urbana-Champaign in 1973, where he served until his retirement in 1997.

Melby has won numerous awards for his work including an NEA Fellowship (1977), a Guggenheim Fellowship (1983), an award from the American Academy of Arts and Letters (1984), and the 1979 First Prize from the International Electroacoustic Music Awards in Bourges, France.

His music is published by Theodore Presser Company (Merion Music), Associated Music Publishers, and American Composers Alliance. Recordings are available on a number of record labels. An all-Melby disc of three concerti was released on the Albany Records label in 2008.

== Major works ==
=== Orchestral ===
- Concerto for Computer and Orchestra (1987)
- Symphony No. 1 (1993)
- Thanatopsis (1999) for lyric baritone, chorus, and orchestra
- Symphony No. 2 (2004)
- Piano Concerto No. 3 (2010)
- Violin Concerto No. 3 (2011)
- Violoncello Concerto No. 3 (2012)
- Viola Concerto No. 3 (2013)
- Symphony No. 3 (2019)
- Symphony No. 4 (2020)
- Symphony No. 5 (2020)
- Symphony No. 6 (2021)
- Symphony No. 7 (2021)
- Symphony No. 8 (2021)
- Symphony No. 9 (2022)
- Symphony No. 10 (2023)
- Symphony No. 11 (2024)
- Symphony No. 12 (2024)
- Symphony No. 13 (2025)
- Symphony No. 14 (2025)

=== Electro-Acoustic Concerti ===
- Violin (No. 1: 1979 and No. 2: 1986)
- Violoncello (No. 1: 1981 and No. 2: 1989)
- Viola (No. 1: 1982 and No. 2: 2009)
- Flute (No. 1: 1984 and No. 2: 1990)
- Violin and English Horn (1984)
- Piano (No. 1: 1985 and No. 2: 2006)
- Clarinet (No. 1: 1986 and No. 2: 2006)
- English Horn (1986)
- Contrabass (1989)
- Violin and Piano (2008)

=== Electro-Acoustic and Acoustic Vocal ===
- Two Norwegian Songs (1965–66) for soprano (or tenor) and piano (texts by Henrik Ibsen)
- Due canti de Leopardi (1966/74) for soprano, horn and piano (texts by Giacomo Leopardi)
- Two Dances (1970) for tenor and piano (text by L. E. Kramer)
- Valedictory (1973) for soprano and computer (text by L. E. Kramer)
- Two Stevens Songs (1975) for soprano and computer (texts by Wallace Stevens)
- The men that are falling (1978) for soprano, piano, and computer (text by Wallace Stevens)
- Peter Quince at the Clavier (1988) for soprano and computer (text by Wallace Stevens)
- Three Wordsworth Songs (2005) for soprano and computer (texts by William Wordsworth)
- In Darkness (2007) for soprano and computer (texts by Amy Lowell)
- Aftermath (2009) for soprano and computer (texts by Amy Lowell)
- For Milton (2011) for soprano and computer (text by Percy Bysshe Shelley)
- A Japanese Wood-Carving (2014) for soprano and string quartet (text by Amy Lowell)

=== Electro-Acoustic Solo and Chamber ===
- 91 Plus 5 (1969–70) for brass quintet and computer
- Zonnorities (1974) for oboe/English horn, clarinet/bass clarinet, and computer
- Transparences (1977) for trumpet and computer
- Passages (1977–78) for tuba and computer
- Accelerazioni (1979) for flute and computer
- In tenebris (1980) for piano and computer
- L'Infinito (1980) for string trio and computer
- Wind, Sand and Stars (1983) for 8 instruments and computer
- Alto Rhapsody (1986) for alto saxophone and computer
- And I remembered the cry of the peacocks (1988) for English horn, string trio, and computer
- Threeplay (1989) for flute, clarinet, contrabass, and computer
- String Quartet No. 3 (1989–90) with computer
- Zonnorities II (1991) for oboe/English horn, clarinet/E♭ clarinet, and computer

=== Acoustic Chamber ===
- Four Pieces for String Quartet (String Quartet No. 1) (1963–64)
- Music for Six Players (1966) for woodwind quintet and piano
- String Quartet No. 2 (1968)
- Composition for Five Brasses (1968)
- Epitaph (in memoriam Carl Ruggles) (1975) for winds and percussion
- O, wind, if winter comes... (2014) for woodwind quintet
- String Quartet No. 4 (2014)
- Brass Quintet (2015)
- Piano Quintet (2016)
- String Quartet No. 5 (2017)
- String Quartet No. 6 (2017)
- String Quartet No. 7 (2019)

=== Acoustic Solo ===
- First Piano Sonata (1964–65, rev. 1993)
- Second Piano Sonata (1966)
- The rest is silence... (1994) for organ

=== Electronics Alone ===
- Å forandre: Seven Variations for Digital Computer (1969)
- ...of quiet desperation (1976)
- Chor der Steine (1979)
- Layers (1981)
- Chor der Waisen (1985)
- Chor der Toten (1988)

=== Choral ===
- Oculi omnium in te sperant, Domine (1976)
