= 12k =

American independent record label

- Founded: 1997; 29 years ago
- Founder: Taylor Deupree
- Genre: Experimental electronic
- Country of origin: U.S.
- Location: Pound Ridge, New York
- Official website: www.12k.com

12k is an American independent record label, based in Pound Ridge, New York, United States. It was founded on January 1, 1997, by Taylor Deupree. The label focuses on experimental electronic music, specifically on digital minimalism and contemporary forms; as of 2021, it has released over 100 albums and become one of "the most consistent, and consistently excellent, record companies in the electronic music world." Notable artists appearing in the label's catalogue include Alva Noto and Frank Bretschneider (co-founder of the Raster-Noton label).

== Current and former artists on 12k ==
- Arovane
- Human Mesh Dance
- Drum Komputer
- Taylor Deupree
- Shuttle 358
- Nosei Sakata
- Richard Chartier
- Tetsu Inoue
- Komet
- Sogar
- Goem
- Ghislain Poirier
- 0/r
- Christopher Willits
- Doron Sadja
- Kenneth Kirschner
- Frank Bretschneider
- Fourcolor
- Minamo
- Steinbrüchel
- Antti Rannisto
- Sawako
- Sébastien Roux
- Seaworthy
- Simon Scott
- Small Color
- Amplifier Machine
- Pillowdiver
- Ben Kaba (Urban Astronaut)
- Lawrence English
- Solo Andata
- Stephen Vitiello
- Ryuichi Sakamoto
- Machinefabriek
- Autistici
- Giuseppe Ielasi
- Gareth Dickson
- Marcus Fischer
- Illuha
- Giuseppe Ielasi
- Tomasz Bednarczyk
- Molly Berg
- Between
- The Boats
- Steve Peters

== Current and former artists on Line ==
- Richard Chartier
- Immedia
- Miki Yui
- Bernhard Günter
- Z.E.L.L.E.
- Steve Roden
- Roel Meelkop
- Asmus Tietchens
- David Lee Myers
- Mark Fell
- Vend
- Chessmachine
- Doublends Vert
- Alva Noto
- Tomas Phillips

== Current and former artists on Happy ==
- Piana
- Gutevolk

== See also ==
- List of record labels
