= And/oar =

Record label focused on field recording

and/OAR
- Founded: 2001
- Founder: Dale Lloyd
- Genre: Field recording, sound art
- Country of origin: U.S.
- Location: Seattle, Washington
- Official website: www.and-oar.org.

and/OAR is an independent record label based in Seattle, Washington. It was founded by Dale Lloyd in 2001 but officially started in May 2002. The label concentrates on raising awareness about field recording and sound art that uses field recording as part of the creative process. From 2001 to 2005, and/OAR released compilations for Phonography.org, a website about field recording.

The label has tried to present sonic phenomena that have rarely been heard and rarely if ever been released on CD, such as the wind of the Patagonia region of South America, singing sand in Japan, booming sand in Mongolia, plumbing apparatuses in southeast Asia, physics labs at Harvard University, Christmas tree lights, and electric fish.

The label's roster includes Arve Henriksen, Francisco López, Maggi Payne, Andrew Deutsch, Taku Sugimoto, Steve Roden, Bernhard Günter, and Arsenije Jovanović.

and/OAR has three label series as well as several sub-series of releases. and/OAR is considered the main label series. either/OAR was started in 2009 to explore instrument-based, avant-garde, improvised music and composed music. mOAR was founded in 2008 to explore genre-blurring electronic music

== Roster ==
- Kyle Bruckmann
- Celer
- Christopher DeLaurenti
- Jim Denley
- Taylor Deupree
- Andrew Deutsch
- Gintas K
- Kraig Grady
- Arve Henriksen
- Francisco Lopez
- Kim Myhr
- Maggi Payne
