= Savvas Ysatis =

Greek electronic musician (born 1968)

- Born: July 1, 1968 (age 57); Athens, Greece
- Occupation: electronic musician

Savvas Ysatis (born July 1, 1968) is a Greek electronic musician.

== Early life ==
Ysatis was born in Athens, Greece, and developed an interest in the synthesizer through exposure to electronic music by artists such as Kraftwerk and Jean Michel Jarre in the late 1970s. At age 15, he left Greece to move to New York City, where he acquired some musical equipment and began experimenting.

His early ambient solo work was produced under the moniker Omicron. He met and started working with Taylor Deupree in 1993 and released a number of albums and tracks, with a variety of styles and under a few different names. Ysatis and Deupree released their ambient work as Seti, their jazzy trip hop as Futique, and their more dance-oriented work as Arc. Most of Ysatis' work while in New York was released on the Instinct label.

== Recent activity ==
In 1997, Ysatis returned to Athens to help the growing Greek electronic music scene. He founded the Sonar label with radio DJ Giannis Papaioannou. He also started the Allou project with vocalist Elias Aslanoglou, which has signed with the V2 label.

== Musical style ==
Ysatis' early work, as characterized by his Omicron releases, and his work with Deupree for SETI, focused mainly on ambient music. The Futique project was a completely different combination of trip hop and jazz. The Arc project fit somewhere between the two other projects, with a stripped-down Detroit techno style, with a little experimental edge. His latest solo work on the Tresor label moves to a classic techno feel.

== Bands ==
- Omicron
- Sound Track
- Seti (with Deupree)
- Futique (with Deupree)
- Arc (with Deupree)
- Skai (with Deupree)
- Allou (with Aslanoglou)

== Discography ==
- Symbolis EP (as Omicron) (1993, Instinct)
- Acrocosm (as Omicron) (1994, Instinct)
- SETI (as SETI) (1994, Instinct)
- The Generation and Motion of a Pulse (as Omicron) (1995, Instinct)
- Pharos (as SETI) (1995, Instinct)
- Globetrotter (as Omicron) (1996, Radical Ambient)
- Ciphers (as SETI) (1996, Instinct)
- 12K (as Arc) (1996, Instinct)
- Luv Luv (as Futique) (1996, Instinct)
- Electronic Dance Music (as Omicron) (1997, Radical Ambient)
- Paging Mr. So-and-So (as Futique) (1997, Shadow)
- Arc vs. Tiny Objects in Space (as Arc) (1998, Instinct)
- Tower of Winds (as Savvas Ysatis & Taylor Deupree) (1998, Caipirinha)
- Go Low (1999, Shadow)
- Alright EP (1999, Tresor)
- Highrise (1999, Tresor)
- The Cooler (as Sound Track) (2000, Caipirinha)
- Select (2001, Tresor)

=== Compilations ===
Ysatis' work appeared on the following compilation releases:

- Chill Out! (1994, Instinct)
- Chillout: Phase 2 (1994, Instinct)
- Plug In + Turn On (1994, Instinct)
- Plug In + Turn On X 2 (1994, Instinct)
- Trancefusion, Volume 2 (1994, Instinct)
- Instinct Ambient Collection (1995, Instinct)
- Ambient Systems, Volume 2 (1996, Instinct)
- Exit to New York (1996, Radical Ambient)
- Ambient Systems, Volume 3 (1997, Instinct)
- Earthrise Shadow, Volume 3 (1997, Shadow)
- Trip Hop & Jazz, Volume 3 (1997, Instinct)
- Caipirinha Music Sampler: Re-Inventing Culture (1998, Caipirinha)
- Digital Reflex (1998, Instinct)
- Pure Abstrakt: Adventures in Dub (1998, Shadow)
- Ambient Systems, Volume 4 (1999, Instinct)
- Microscopic Sound (1999, Caipirinha)
- Annex 2 (1999, Tresor)
- Tresor, Volume 7 (1999, Tresor)
- Orbit Lounge (2000, Shadow)
- Tresor, Volume 8 (2000, Tresor)
- Ambient Boxed: A Guide by Instinct (2001, Instinct)
- State of E:Motion, Vol. 9 (2001, E:Motion)
- Blunted, Volume 3 (2003, Shadow)
- Tresor, Volume 12 (2004, Tresor)
