= Richard Chartier =

- Born: March 29, 1971 (age 55)
- Origin: Washington, DC
- Years active: 1998 – present
- Labels: 12k/Line, Raster-Noton, Spekk, Die Stadt, Trente Oiseaux and others
- Website: Richard Chartiers's homepage

Richard Chartier (born March 29, 1971) is a sound installation artist and graphic designer from the United States. He works in reductionist microsound electronic music, a form of extreme minimalism characterised by quiet and sparse sound.

A practitioner of sound installation, his notable works include specification.twelve (2003), a collaboration with Taylor Deupree in which eight speakers play unique music which listeners hear differently depending on their position. Another is Aurora Liminalis (2013), a collaboration with William Basinski.

== Early life and education ==
Chartier was born in Arlington, Virginia, in 1971, and studied at James Madison University in Harrisonburg, Virginia, from 1989 to 1993, graduating with a Bachelor of Fine Arts Cum Laude with a Concentration in Graphic Design and Painting.

== Career ==
Chartier's sound works and sound installations have been included in the exhibits Sounding Spaces at ICC (Tokyo, Japan), I Moderni / The Moderns at Castello di Rivoli (Torino, Italy), 2002 Biennial at the Whitney Museum of American Art in New York, Resynthesis at the Art Institute of Chicago and with the traveling sound exhibit Invisible Cities created by digital media curators Fehler as well as solo and collaborative installations for Fusebox (DC), 1515 Arts/G Fine Art (DC), Die Schachtel (Milan, Italy), and Diapason (New York). He has performed his work live across Europe, Japan, Australia, and North America at MUTEK (Montreal, Canada), GRM/Maison de Radio France (Paris, France), Observatori (Valencia, Spain), DEAF (Dublin, Ireland), Transmediale (Berlin, Germany), Lovebytes (Sheffield, UK), the Leeds International Film Festival (Leeds, UK), the Rotterdam International Film Festival (NE), Garage (Stralsund, Germany), La Batie (Geneva, Switzerland), and other digital art/music festivals and at exhibits such as Frequenzen [Hz] at the Schirn Kunsthalle (Frankfurt) and A Minimal Future? Art as Object 1958-1968 and Visual Music at the Museum of Contemporary Art (Los Angeles).

In 2000 he formed the recording label LINE, which releases compositional and installation work by sound artists and composers working with contemporary and digital minimalism, including Bernhard Gunter, Steve Roden, Taylor Deupree, Christopher Willits, Roel Meelkop, Carsten Nicolai/Alva Noto, Asmus Tietchens, Mark Fell and the first full-length CDs by Miki Yui, Skoltz_Kolgen, and Steinbruchel. The first release on LINE, Chartier's Series, was awarded Honorable Mention in the category of Digital Music by the Prix Ars Electronica, 2001 (Austria). In 2006 he was commissioned by the Hirshhorn Museum and Sculpture Garden to create a collaborative sound performance work in conjunction with the Hiroshi Sugimoto retrospective exhibit. This work, entitled Specification. Fifteen, was awarded one of five Honorable Mentions for outstanding contemporary artistic positions in digital media art by the jury of the Transmediale.07 Award Competition in Germany, and exhibited as a recording and presented as a live performance with a new video work created from Sugimoto's Seascapes at the Akademie der Kuenste (Berlin).

In 2009, Richard Chartier presented a collaborative installation with visual artist Linn Meyers. Untitled, exhibited at the Art Gallery of University of Maryland (US) two 15-foot-long (4.6 m) by 8-foot-high (2.4 m) walls meet in an enfolding chevron, creating both a sound chamber and a drawing surface. The swirling lines of Meyers' drawing were drawn directly on the surface of the walls, accompanied by a sound piece by Chartier. With eight audio transducers applied directly to the back surface of the walls, Chartier's composition modulates and transfers through the surfaces. Untitled(Angle.1), a stereo composition based on Untitled was released on Non Visual Objects (Austria) as a limited edition CD.

In March 2010, Chartier was awarded a Smithsonian Institution Artist Research Fellowship to study the National Museum of American History's collection of 19th Century acoustic apparatus for scientific demonstration. Chartier will focus specifically on the many sirens, waveforms, and other inventions of the German physicist Rudolf Koenig including the Grand Tonometer (c. 1870–1875), the only instrument of its kind in existence.

Since 1998, Chartier has created recordings for labels such as LINE (USA), Raster-Noton (Germany), Die Stadt (Germany), Spekk (Japan), 12k (US) Mutek rec (Canada), DSP (Italy), ERS (Netherlands), Trente Oiseaux (Germany), Fallt (Ireland), Intransitive (USA), and collaborated with artists Taylor Deupree, William Basinski, CoH, Kim Cascone, and Asmus Tietchens.

== Reception ==
A 2013 review in Inverted Audio described Chartier's sound as "meditative and precise" and that "His minimalism points forward in an unforgiving quest for innovation, a desire to explore, develop and conquer new approaches and techniques."

== Selected discography ==
=== Solo Recordings ===
- A Field for Recording CD (2010, Room40)
- Untitled(Angle.1) CD (2009, NVO)
- Further Materials CD (2008, LINE)
- Absence CD (2008, 3particles)
- Incidence CD (2007, Raster-Noton)
- Current CD (2006, Room40)
- Levels(Inverted) CD (2006, LINE)
- Tracing CD (2005, NVO)
- Opening Coccyx Die Schachtel, Italy] CD/Edition 2005
- Retrieval 1-5 [ERS, Netherlands] CD 2005
- Re'post'postfabricated [DSP, Italy] (reformed+remixes) 2xCD 2005
- Set or Performance [LINE, US] CD 2004
- Archival1991 [Crouton, US] CD 2003
- Overview 3particles, US] CD 2003
- Two Locations [LINE, US] CD 2003
- Other Materials [3particles, US] CD 2003
- of surfaces [LINE, US] CD 2002
- typeof Fällt, N.Ireland] 3" CD 2001
- decisive forms Trente Oiseaux, Germany] CD 2001
- series [LINE, US] CD 2000 / reissued 2001
- a hesitant fold [Meme, Japan] CD 1999
- post-fabricated [Microwave, Netherlands] CDR 1999
- direct.incidental.consequential [Intransitive, US] CD 1998

=== Collaborative Recordings ===
- Fabrication 2 (with Asmus Tietchens) 2CD (2010, Auf Abwegen)
- Untitled 1-3 (with William Basinski) [LINE, USA] CD 2008
- Fabrication (with Asmus Tietchens)[Die Stadt, Germany] 2CD 2007
- Specification. Fifteen (with Taylor Deupree)[LINE, US] CD 2006
- Live in Los Angeles (as CHESSMACHINE) [LINE, US] CD 2005
- Chessmachine (with COH) [Mutek_rec, Canada] CD 2004
- William Basinski + Richard Chartier [Spekk, Japan] CD 2004
- Varied as 0/r (with Nosei Sakata) [12k, US] CD 2002
- after (Cascone + Chartier + Deupree) [12k, US] CD 2002
- SPEC. (with Taylor Deupree) [12k, US] CD 1999
- 0/r (with Nosei Sakata) [12k, US]CD 1999
