= Francisco López (musician) =

Experimental musician and sound artist

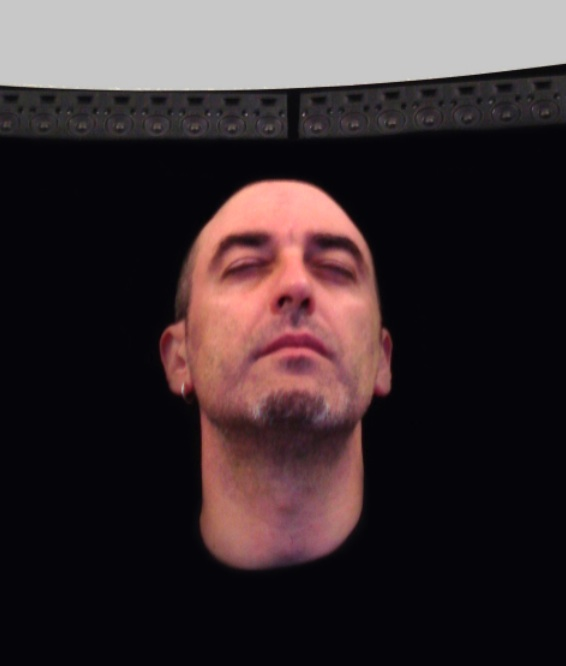
- Francisco López in 2008

Background information
- Born: Francisco López; 1964 (age 61–62)
- Origin: Madrid, Spain
- Genres: Experimental music Musique concrète Sound art Soundscape; Noise music
- Occupations: Musician; Sound artist
- Years active: 1982–present
- Label: Table of the Elements
- Website: www.franciscolopez.net

Francisco López is an avant-garde experimental musician and sound artist.

He has released a large amount of sound pieces with record labels from more than fifty countries and realized hundreds of concerts and sound installations worldwide; including some of the main international museums, galleries and festivals, such as: P.S.1 Contemporary Art Center (New York City), London Institute of Contemporary Arts, Paris Museum of Modern Art, National Auditorium of Music, Reina Sofia Museum of Modern Art, Barcelona Museum of Contemporary Art, Buenos Aires Museum of Modern Art, International Film Festival Rotterdam, Sónar, Darwin Fringe Festival, Kitakyushu Municipal Museum of Art.

For the Spanish Pavilion of the Expo 2008, López presented a "double sonic intervention", consisting of both an indoor sound installation and an outdoor performance.

In 2006, López won the First Prize for the Sound Art Competition of the Museo de Arte Contemporáneo de Castilla y León. He has received honorable mention of the Prix Ars Electronica on three occasions (1999, 2002, 2007) and is the recipient of the Qwartz Award 2010 for best sound anthology.

He is director and curator of SONM (The Sound Archive of Experimental Music and Sound Art).

== Selected discography ==
The following is a partial discography, from the more than 200 releases by Francisco López.

- (1983) Untitled (Anomma)
- (1990) La Primera Aventura de Cekoni y Conike, with Miguel Ángel Ruiz (Toracic Tapes / Irre Tapes)
- (1993) Azoic Zone (Geometrik)
- (1994) Tonhaus (Hyades Arts)
- (1995) Warszawa Restaurant (Trente Oiseaux)
- (1996) Paris hiss (Banned Production)
- (1996) Belle Confusion 966 (Trente Oiseaux)
- (1997) Addy en el país de las frutas y los chunches (Alien8 Recordings)
- (1998) La Selva (V2_Archief)
- (1998) Belle Confusion 969 (Sonoris)
- (1999) Untitled #89 (Or)
- (2000) Untitled #104 (Alien8 Recordings)
- (2000) Belle Confusion 00, with Amy Denio (Absolute)
- (2000) Untitled #92 (Mego)
- (2001) Whint, with Zbigniew Karkowski (Absolute)
- (2001) Nav, with John Duncan (Absolute)
- (2001) Buildings [New York] (V2_Archief)
- (2002) Le Chemin du Paradis, with Steve Roden (Fario)
- (2003) Wasps (Longbox)
- (2004) A Szellem Álma, with Marc Behrens (Absolute)
- (2005) Mavje, with Andrey Kiritchenko (Nexsound)
- (2006) Untitled #180 (Alien8 Recordings)
- (2006) Buzzin' Fly / Dormant Spores, with Z'EV (Lapilli)
- (2006) Hysechasterion (Antifrost)
- (2007) Lopez Island (Elevator Bath)
- (2007) Wind [Patagonia] (And/oar)
- (2008) Technocalyps (Alien8 Recordings)
- (2009) HB, with Lawrence English (Baskaru)
- (2009) Through The Looking-Glass (KAIROS)
- (2009) Untitled #228 (ini.itu)
- (2010) Machines (Elevator Bath)
- (2010) Amarok (Glacial Movements Records)
- (2010) Köllt / Kulu (Störung)
- (2011) Untitled #244 (Sub Rosa)
- (2011) Krmn, with Maurizio Bianchi (Important Records)
- (2011) Titans, with Novi_sad (GH Records)
- (2011) Untitled #275 (Unsounds)
- (2012) Untitled #284 (Crónica)
- (2012) BioMechanica - BM01, with Arturo Lanz (Geometrik)
- (2013) Lith, with Aernoudt Jacobs (Sub Rosa)
- (2013) Untitled #308 (Very Quiet Records)
- (2013) Heitsi-Eibib-Rec (Yugen Art)
- (2014) Hyper-Rainforest (Nowhere Worldwide)
- (2015) Untitled #274 (Important Records)
- (2015) Yo-kai 17.1ch sound installation (Sapporo noble＊north2)
- (2016) Anima Ardens (Sub Rosa)
- (2017) Untitled #352 (Nowhere Worldwide)
- (2018) Untitled #360 (Emitter Micro)
- (2019) Ekkert Nafn, with Miguel A. García (Crónica)

== Music for video, film and dance ==
Partial listing:

- 1985 'Andalucía', video by Rafael Flores.
- 1992 'Vigo, paseos visuales', video by Matusa Barros.
- 1994 'Katodiko-2', video by Armando Benito.
- 2003 'köllt', film by Francisco López and Jorge Simonet.
- 2006 'TechnoCalyps', documentary film by Frank Theys.
- 2009 "Mamori", film by Karl Lemieux.
- 2015 “Zagreb Confidential”, soundtrack film by Darko Fritz & Ivan Klif.
- 2016 “Anima Ardens”, dance piece by choreographer Thierry Smits / Companie Thor.
