= Molissa Fenley =

American choreographer and peformer

Molissa Fenley (born 1954) is an American choreographer, performer and a teacher of contemporary dance.

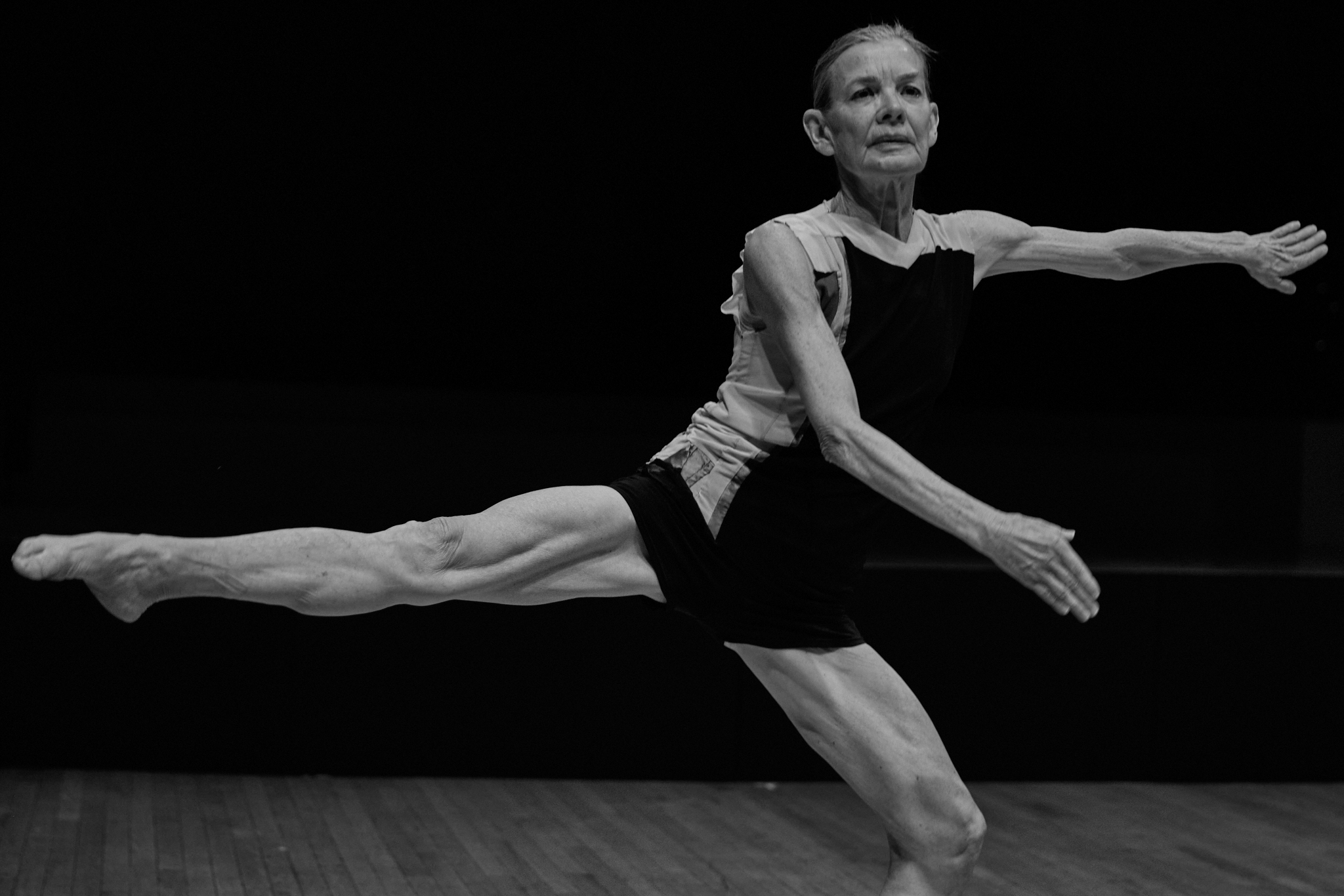
Molissa Fenley in 2024

== Early life and education ==
Molissa Fenley (née Avril Molissa Fenley) was born in Las Vegas, Nevada on November 15, 1954. She is the youngest of three children born to Eileen Allison Walker and John Morris Fenley. At the age of six months Fenley and her family moved to Ithaca, NY where her father was a professor of the Agricultural Extension at Cornell University. At the age of six, her family moved to Ibadan, Nigeria where her father worked for the US State Department's USAID program. Fenley attended high school in Spain, and in 1971, at 16, returned to the US to enter Mills College from which she received her BA in Dance in 1975. Immediately after graduating from Mills, Fenley moved to New York City to begin her career as a choreographer and dancer.

== Career ==
=== Early years ===
Upon arriving in New York City in 1975, Fenley trained with Merce Cunningham, Viola Farber and studied at the Erick Hawkins School. During her first years in New York Fenley danced for several choreographers including Carol Conway and Andy de Groat. She began creating her own work and formed Molissa Fenley and Company in 1977. After a tour of European festivals in 1980 her work began to receive more critical attention in the United States and abroad. Her early career (1977–1987) was focused on presenting ensemble work. In addition to more traditional dance classes, Fenley and her dancers did workouts that included running, calisthenics and weight training. Fenley has maintained this aesthetic of athletic virtuosity throughout her career.

=== Solo work ===
In 1987 she disbanded her ensemble and made a shift to performing solo works, often in collaboration with visual artists including Roy Fowler, Keith Haring, Jene Hightstein, Richard Long, Kiki Smith, Keith Sonnier, Merrill Wagner and composers such as John Bischoff, Alvin Curran, Anthony Davis, Philip Glass, Laurie Anderson, Pauline Oliveros, Ryuichi Sakamoto, Jamaaladeen Tacuma, and Laetitia Sonami [. It was during this period that she created her work, State of Darkness (1988), which was commissioned by the American Dance Festival in Durham, N.C. Set to Igor Stravinsky's Le Sacre du Printemps, this 35 minute solo received critical acclaim for both its physical rigor, innovative use of Stravinsky's score and intense sense of ritual drama. Fenley reconstructed State of Darkness in 1999 at the request of New York City Ballet principal dancer Peter Boal, and again in 2007 for Boal's performance at Pacific Northwest Ballet. State of Darkness received a Bessie Award for both Fenley's original performance in 1989 and for Boal's reconstruction in 1999. The solo work was performed on successive evenings by seven dancers for the Joyce Theater Productions' revival in 2021.

=== Current work ===
After a decade of solo work, Fenley began creating ensemble pieces performed by herself and her company. She continues to create and perform in the United States and abroad. Fenley has maintained a long-time collaboration with composer Philip Glass and continues to collaborate with visual artists, composers and writers. . Recent works include De La Lumière, Entre Les Lampes (2023), with music by Philip Glass, Current Pieces 1-3 (2023) with pianist Min Kwon; The Cut-Outs (Matisse), (2017), with poet Bob Holman; Rue Surf (2016) with painter Roy Fowler and poet Bob Holman; Redwood Park, Part 1 (2014) with music by Joan Jeanrenaud; BEAMS (2014), with music by Alvin Curran; Found Object (2014) with Erin Gee, John Guare, Joy Harjo, and Rudy Wurlitzer; Vessel Stories (2011), music by Philip Glass and Credo in Us (2011) set to the John Cage piece of the same name.

Her works have been presented in the United States, Canada, Brazil, Venezuela, Colombia, South America, Europe, Australia, India, Indonesia, Japan, Korea, Singapore, Taiwan, Hong Kong and Mexico [8].

Her work has been commissioned by The American Dance Festival, the Bill T. Jones/Arnie Zane Dance Company, the Dia Art Foundation, Seattle Dance Project, Marymount Manhattan College, Deutsche Opera Ballet of Berlin, Robert Moses' Kin, The Foundation for Contemporary Performance Arts, the William Hale Harkness Foundation, The New National Theater, Tokyo, The Ohio Ballet, Australian Dance Theater, The Brooklyn Academy of Music, Barnard/Columbia, Repertory Dance Theater, Oakland Ballet, Jacob's Pillow Dance Festival, Pacific Northwest Ballet, The Oakland Ballet, National Institute of Seoul and New York Live Arts. In 2015 Seagull Press/University of Chicago published Rhythm Field: The Dance of Molissa Fenley about her life and work. Other recent works in include: Archeology in Reverse with artist Catherine Wagner and Artifact in 2018, Untitled (Haiku) and Some phrases I'm hoping Andy would like in 2019, and The Cut Outs (Matisse) in 2020 with longtime collaborator and poet Bob Holman. In 2020, Fenley revisited her 1988 work State of Darkness, setting the solo on Jared Brown, Lloyd Knight, Sara Mearns, Shamel Pitts, Annique Roberts, Cassandra Trenary and Michael Trusnovec. The work was live-streamed in 2020 and performed live at The Joyce in 2021. Dancers Annique Roberts and Michael Trusnovec performed the work in 2022 at the American Dance Festival.

== Recognition and professional affiliations ==
Fenley's contribution to her field has been recognized with awards in the United States and internationally. She is an eleven-time recipient of the National Endowment for the Arts Choreography Fellowship. Fenley received a Bessie Award for Choreography in 1985 for her work Cenotaph and again in 1988 for State of Darkness. Fenley received a 2000 Foundation for Contemporary Arts Grants to Artists Award, The Greenwich Collection, LIATIS, the Asian Cultural Council and the Cadbury Trust. She is a Guggenheim Fellow (2008), a Fellow of the American Academy in Rome (2008) and recipient of the American Masterpieces Initiative from the National Endowment of the Arts (2010). Fenley is a member of many professional arts organizations such as the Atlantic Center for the Arts, American Dance Guild, Asian Cultural Council, CHIME Mentorship program, Dance USA, International Dance Council and New York Live Arts. She is the Executive Director of the Momenta Foundation which she founded in 1986. Mills College and Higher Education Teaching In addition to being one of Mills College's most esteemed alumna, Fenley worked as a professor in Mills College Dance Department faculty from 1999 to 2020. She began as a Distinguished Visiting Professor in 1999 and became an Associate Professor of Dance in 2006 and Full Professor in Fenley taught courses in technique . She was made Full Professor in 2013. Fenley taught courses in technique, choreography and oversaw MFA candidates' thesis projects. Additionally, Fenley often set work on Mills College's Repertory Dance Company. She was awarded the Mills College Sarlo Excellence in Teaching Award in 2011. Extensive archives from Fenley's career were held at the F.W. Olin Library's Special Collections on Mills campus until 2022. They have been promised to the Jerome Robbins Dance Division of the New York Public Library for the Performing Arts at Lincoln Center in New York.

Fenley has taught as a Visiting Lecturer at New York University's Experimental Theater Wing, University of Georgia at Athens and University of Utah. She worked as a Resident Artist for the Baryshnikov Arts Center, The Atlantic Center for the Arts, The American Academy in Rome, Bard College, The Hotchkiss School, The Asian Cultural Council in Tokyo, Yaddo, the Bogliasco Foundation, Djerassi, Bloedel Reserve, Marble House Project and Harvard University. She has taught repertory workshops at Bennington College, Barnard/Columbia and Hunter College.

== Personal life ==
Fenley resides in New York, NY and Summerland, CA. She is married to painter Roy Fowler.

== Major works ==
Fenley, to date, has choreographed over 90 works, which include:

- In the Garden (with Ryuichi) (2023), sound of birdsong, danced by Molissa Fenley, Justin Lynch, Michael Trusnovec, Timothy Ward
- De La Lumière, Entre Les Lampes New Chaconne (2023), music by Philip Glass, danced by Christiana Axelsen, Justin Lynch, Timothy Ward
- Etruscan Matisse/Blake (2023), music by Ryuichi Sakamoto, 20210310 (2021) danced by Christiana Axelsen, Molissa Fenley, Justin Lynch, Michael Trusnovec, Timothy Ward
- Lava Field (Fenley) with Dead Stars Still Shine (Tanjuaquio) (2022), collaboration with Paz Tanjuaquio. Music by John Bischoff, Piano 7hz (2002).
- Cosmati Variations, Variation 5 (2022), music by John Cage, Third Construction (1941)
- Rhythm Field (2021), music by Jamal Mohamed, created for Southern Methodist University dance department
- Pipes Going Nowhere (2021), music by Julian Julien, collaboration with Rebecca Chaleff, Sara Mearns and Cassandra Trenary. This work was never publicly performed.
- State of Darkness (Revival 2021) - performed for a live audience at the Joyce Theater: Jared Brown, Lloyd Knight, Sara Mearns, Annique Roberts, Michael Trusnovec, Cassandra Trenary
- State of Darkness (Revival 2020), music by Igor Stravinsky; commissioned by The Joyce Theater and live streamed in October 2020 – for Jared Brown, Lloyd Knight, Sara Mearns, Shamel Pitts, Annique Roberts, Michael Trusnovec, Cassandry Trenary
- The Cut-Outs (Matisse) (2020), Created in collaboration with poet Bob Holman and composer Keith Patchell
- Some phrases I'm hoping Andy would like (2019), Choreographed as a tribute to the late choreographer Andrew de Groat
- Untitled (Haiku) (2019), Created in collaboration with poet Joy Harjo and composer Larry Mitchell
- Artifact (2018), Created for dancer Peiling Kao. This work premiered as part of Kao's solo works concert Honolulu, HI.
- Archeology in Reverse (2018), Created in collaboration with artist Catherine Wagner. Video and sound by Michael Mersereau.
- Circadian Rhythm (2016), created in collaboration with visual artist Robert Gaylor with music by Peter Garland
- Rue Surf (2016), collaboration with poet Bob Holman and artist Roy Fowler
- Water Table (2016), a work in 8 parts:

- Parts 1 and 2 – The Third Coast, music by Ryuichi Sakamoto
- Part 3 – Baffin Island, music by Ryuichi Sakamoto
- Part 4 – Sargasso Sea
- Part 5 – The Pattern of the Surface, music by Philip Glass
- Part 6 – On the Other Ocean, music by David Behrman
- Part 7 – Amdo, music by Ulfur Hansson
- Part 8 – Mali, music by Laetitia Sonami

- Seven (2015), commissioned by Dana and Shinichi Iova-Koga as part of 95 Rituals for Anna Halprin
- Dance an Impossible Space (2014), music composed and performed by Erin Gee
- Redwood Park, Part 1 (2014), commissioned by the Oakland Ballet. Music composed by Joan Jeanrenaud
- Redwood Park, part 2 (2014), in silence.
- Esperanto (2014), reconstructed by Christiana Axelsen and Molissa Fenley, music by Ryuichi Sakamoto
- Entrance (2014), duet for Christiana Axelsen and Molissa Fenley, music by David Behrman
- BEAMS (2014), music by Alvin Curran
- Found Object (2014), collaboration with Erin Gee, John Guare, Joy Harjo, Rudy Wurlitzer; performed by Christiana Axelsen, Rebecca Chaleff, Molissa Fenley, Peiling Kao, Rosemary Quinn
- Horizon, (2013), music by Pauline Oliveros
- Found Object (2012), collaboration with Peiling Kao
- Cross Bridge, (2012), collaboration with Holley Farmer, John Jesurun, David Moodey and Rosemary Quinn
- Credo In Us, (2011), music by John Cage. Commissioned by the Mills College Art Museum
- The Vessel Stories (2011), music by Philip Glass
- The Prop Dances (2010)

- Pieces of Land, props by Jene Highstein, music by Jason Hoopes
- 94 Feathers, props by Merrill Wagner, music by Cenk Ergün
- Mass Balance, prop by Todd Richmond, music by Cenk Ergün
- Planes in Air, props by Roy Fowler, music by Joan Jeanrenaud
- Prop Dance #5, props by Keith Sonnier, music by Lainie Fefferman

- Regions (Revival), (2010), set by Roy Fowler, with music by Maggi Payne
- Double Beginning (2009), with spoken word by Bob Holman
- Ice, Dew, Food, Crew, Ape (2009), with music by Alvin Curran
- Cosmati Variations (2008-2024), with music by John Cage
- Calculus and Politics (2007), with music by Harry Partch. Commissioned by The Joyce Theater
- Four Lines, (2006), with music by Jon Gibson
- Dreaming Awake, (2006), with music by Philip Glass. Commissioned by the Rovereto Music Festival, Rovereto, Italy
- Patterns and Expectations, (2006), with music by Fred Frith
- Desert Sea, (2005), with music by Lou Harrison. Commissioned by Repertory Dance Theatre, Salt Lake City, Utah
- Lava Field, (2004), with music by John Bischoff
- Kuro Shio, (2003), with music by Bun Ching Lam. Commissioned by Women in Dance/Seoul, Korea and Tokyo, Japan
- Water Courses (2003), with music by Joy Harjo
- Waiting For Rain (2003), with music by Robert Ashley, set by Roy Fowler. Commissioned by Peter Boal
- 331 Steps (2002), with music by Laetitia Sonami, set by Merrill Wagner
- Short Stories (2002), with music by Anthony Davis and in silence, costumes by Chado
- Signs/Landmark (2001), with music by Somei Satoh. Commissioned by the New National Theater, Tokyo
- Folds (2001), with music by Fred Frith, choreographed in collaboration with Bebe Miller. Commissioned by Virginia Commonwealth University
- Ceremony(2000), text by Joy Harjo
- Spring Waterfall (2000), music by Philip Glass and Foday Musa Suso
- Island (2000), with music by Harold Meltzer, artwork by Carol Hepper
- I and You Resemble Each Other, Now (2000), with music by Somei Satoh
- Delta (2000), music by John Cage
- Weathering (2000), with set by Merrill Wagner
- Voices (1999), music by Kevin Volans, with cellist Joan Jeanrenaud
- Timbral Inventions (1999), music by John Cage
- Tala (1999), with music by John Cage. La Muse Menagére (1998) with music by Darius Milhaud
- Icho (1997) music by Leroy Jenkins, commissioned by Felicia Norton
- On the Other Ocean (1997) with music by David Behrman
- Trace (1997) with composer Jonathan Hart Makwaia, painter Roy Fowler and writer John Jesurun. Commissioned by the Joyce Theater
- Latitudes(1996), a work created for the internet, commissioned by the Dia Art Foundation
- Pola'a (1996) with music by Lou Harrison. Commissioned by Jacob's Pillow
- Regions (1995) with music by Maggi Payne. Commissioned by the 92nd Street Y
- Savanna (1995) with music by Peter Garland. Commissioned by Peggy Baker Dance Projects
- Sita (1995) with composer Philip Glass and photographer Sandi Fellman. Commissioned by the Joyce Theater
- Jalan Jalan (1994), music by Lou Harrison
- Bridge of Dreams (1994) with composer Laurie Anderson and visual artist Kiki Smith. Commissioned by the Deutsche Oper Berlin
- Witches' Float (1993) with composer Alvin Lucier and visual artist Kiki Smith. Commissioned by the Krannert Art Center
- Sightings (1993) with composer Pauline Oliveros and sculptor Tatsuo Miyajima
- Nullarbor (1993) with composer Robert Lloyd and sculptor Richard Long
- Channel (1993) with composer Somei Satoh and visual artist Richard Serra
- Tilliboyo/Escalay (1993) with composers Foday Musa Suso and Hamza El Din
- Place (1992) with music by Arvo Pärt. Commissioned by the Foundation for Contemporary Performance Arts
- Threshold (1992), with music by Somei Satoh. Commissioned by The Joyce Theater
- Inner Enchantments (1991), with music by Philip Glass
- Bardo (1990), with music by Somei Satoh. Commissioned by Jacob's Pillow
- Augury (1989) with music by Christopher Hyams-Hart, choreographed in collaboration with Doug Varone, commissioned by The American Dance Festival
- The Floor Dances (1989) with composer Henryk Gorecki and sculptor Richard Long. Commissioned by the Dia Art Foundation
- Provenance Unknown (1989), with composer Philip Glass. Commissioned by Dance Chance and The Kitchen for Video, Music and Dance
- State of Darkness (1988), music by Igor Stravinsky. Commissioned by the American Dance Festival. Subsequently, reconstructed for Peter Boal (1999), commissioned by Lincoln Center and for the Pacific Northwest Ballet, (2007) danced in alternation by Rachel Foster, James Moore and Jonathan Porretta
- In Recognition (1988), music by Philip Glass. Commissioned by Serious Fun Festival, Lincoln Center
- Separate Voices (1987), a group work performed in silence. Commissioned by The Joyce Theater
- A Descent into the Maelstrom (1986) music by Philip Glass, set design by Eamon D"Arcy, direction by Matthew McGuire, commissioned by the Adelaide Festival and performed by the Australian Dance Theatre
- Geologic Moments (1986), with composers Philip Glass and Julius Eastman. Commissioned by the Brooklyn Academy of Music, Next Wave Festival
- Feral (1986), music by Robert Lloyd, commissioned by the Ohio Ballet
- Cenotaph (1985), with composer Jamaaladeen Tacuma and text by Eric Bogosian. Commissioned by Jacob's Pillow
- Esperanto (1985), with composer Ryuichi Sakamoto. Commissioned by Tsurumoto Room, Tokyo
- Hemispheres (1983), with composer Anthony Davis and visual artist Francesco Clemente. Commissioned by the Brooklyn Academy of Music, Next Wave Festival
- Eureka (1982), with music by Peter Gordon. Commissioned by Dance Theater Workshop
- Gentle Desire (1981), with music by Mark Freedman. Commissioned by the American Dance Festival
- Peripheral Vision (1981), with music by Mark Freedman
- Energizer (1980), with music by Mark Freedman. Commissioned by Dance Theater Workshop
- Boca Raton (1980), extended dance mix by Paul Alexander of Talking Heads. Decor by Steven Keister
- Mix (1979), Commissioned by The Kitchen for Video, Music and Dance
- Video Clones (1979), video and performance work with Keith Haring
