= Forms of Paper =

Studio album by Steve Roden
- Released: October 2001
- Genre: Lowercase
- Length: 54:01
- Label: Line

Steve Roden chronology
Four Possible Landscapes (2000)	Forms of Paper (2001)	Schindler House (2001)

Alternative cover
- Cover of the 2011 Remastered version

Professional ratings
Review scores
Source	Rating
Pitchfork	7.6

Forms of Paper is an experimental musical work by Steve Roden created solely from heavily distorted sounds of paper being handled. It is a prominent album in the lowercase genre of music.

== Development ==
Forms of Paper was recorded and composed using a computer; a first for Steve Roden. The audio was recorded using regular and contact microphones to record the sounds of rubbing, scraping and otherwise manipulating paper. The recorded sounds were then edited with changes to the equalization and heavy use of repetition.

The work was originally commissioned by the Hollywood branch of the Los Angeles public library for the exhibition "Six Degrees - Art in the Libraries". A ten-minute version of the track was played softly and continuously for a month from eight speakers atop a pedestal covered with the modified pages from a discarded science book. The CD version was expanded and reworked to be nearly an hour long. Only 500 CDs were made of this version and released.

== Remaster ==
Despite praise for the album, Roden was initially displeased with the CD release, feeling that the mastering done by Taylor Deupree was too high volume. A remaster was made by Bernhard Günter later that year which better matched Roden's expectations. Although originally just intended for Roden's personal use, Roden allowed Line to release Günter's remaster for the 10 year anniversary of the original release.

=== Packaging ===
The re-release was accompanied by an essay On lowercase Affinities and Forms of Paper, serving as liner notes.

The remastered version uses a different cover than the original release. The new cover uses a photograph of paper ostensibly from the original L.A. Public Library exhibition. A larger version of the same photograph in the liner notes shows the page is titled Melting Point Index of Organic Compounds (Continued).

== Track listing ==
All tracks are written by Steve Roden.

No.	Title	Length
1.	"Forms of Paper"	54:01
