= Machinefabriek =

Dutch musician and graphic designer

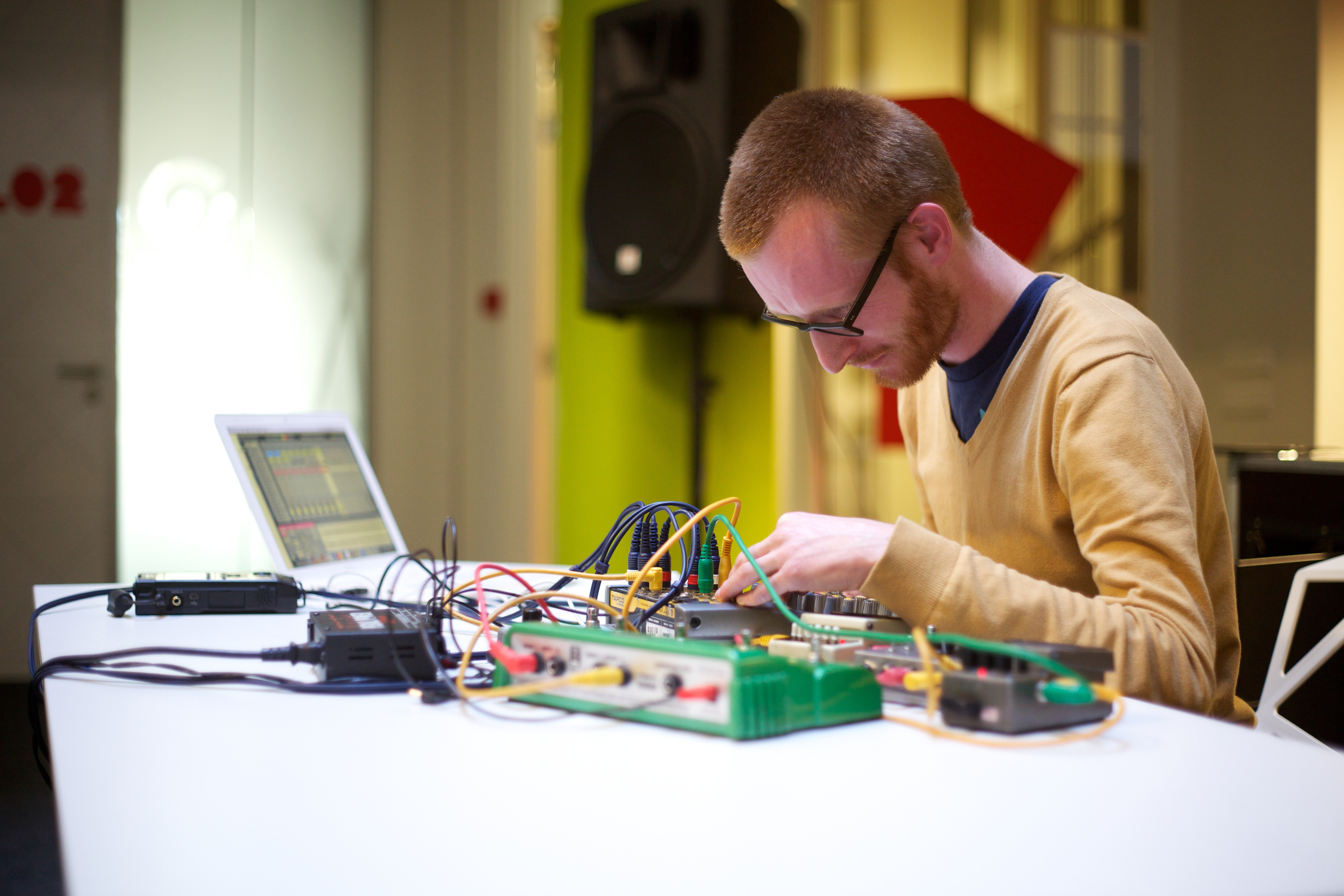
Machinefabriek performing in 2013

Machinefabriek is the musical nom de plume of Dutch musician/sound artist and graphic designer Rutger Zuydervelt.

== Biography ==
Rutger Zuydervelt was born on 28 July 1978 in Apeldoorn, Netherlands. He started working as Machinefabriek in 2004. Except for a few piano and guitar lessons when he was young, Zuydervelt didn’t study music. He graduated as a graphic designer. The sleeves of his releases are practically always designed by Zuydervelt himself, being a crucial part of the music.

Machinefabriek’s music combines elements of ambient, modern classical music, minimalism, drone, field recordings and lowercase. His pieces unfold as ‘films without image’, with a sharp ear for detail. After releasing a series of self-released CD-Rs, the official debut, ‘Marijn’, was issued by Lampse in 2006. Since then a solid stream of singles and albums was released on labels like Type, Home Normal, 12K, Spekk, Dekorder, Digitalis, Experimedia and Staalplaat.

Performing live has been an important expression for Machinefabriek. He took his gear to Russia, Israel, Japan, Canada, Switzerland, Spain, Czech Republic, Germany, Turkey and England.

Rutger collaborated with many artists, among whom Ralph Steinbrüchel, Aaron Martin, Peter Broderick, Frans de Waard, Michel Banabila, Wouter van Veldhoven, Simon Nabatov, Xela, Simon Scott, Steve Roden, Gareth Davis and Tim Catlin. Rutger also works with visual artists. He scored music for dance pieces, films, video installations and sculptures.

Zuydervelt resides in Rotterdam.

In 2020 he was interviewed by the Data.Wave webzine.

== Discography ==
=== Solo recordings ===
- "Marijn" (2006, Lampse/Burning World Recordings, CD, LP)
- "Lenteliedjes" (2006, Type Recordings, mini-CD-R, 7")
- "Bijeen" (2007, Kning Disk, CD)
- "Ranonkel" (2008, Burning World Records, CD)
- "Dauw" (2008, Dekorder, CD)
- "Mort Aux Vaches" (2008, Staalplaat, CD)
- Shuffle (2009, self-released, CDr)
- "Daas" (compilation, 2009, Cold Spring, CD)
- "Vloed" (compilation, 2010, Cold Spring, CD)
- "Diorama" (compilation, 2011, self-released, CDr)
- "Sol Sketches" (2011, self-released, CD)
- "Veldwerk" (compilation, 2011, Cold Spring, CD)
- "Colour Tones" (2012, Fang Bomb, CD)
- "15/15" (2012, WORM, 12 inch
- "Stroomtoon" (2012, Nuun Records, CD)
- "Drum Solos" (2014, Backwards, 12 Inch Vinyl)

=== Collaborations ===
- "Cello Recycling | Cello Drowning]" with Aaron Martin (2007, Type Records, CD, 10")
- "Box Music" with Stephen Vitiello (2008, 12k, CD)
- "Blank Grey Canvas Sky" with Peter Broderick (2009, Fang Bomb, CD, LP, mp3)
- "Glisten" with Tim Catlin (2009, Low Point, CD)
- "Drape" with Gareth Davis (2010, Home Normal, CD)
- "The Hilary Jeffery Tape" with Hilary Jeffery (2010, self-released, cassette)
- "Wurdskrieme" with Piiptsjilling (2010, Experimedia, CD, LP)
- "Maastunnel/Mt.Mitake" with Celer (2011, self-released, 7-inch with two videos by Marco Douma)
- "Grower" with Gareth Davis] (2011, Sonic Pieces, CD)
- "Ghost Lanes" with Gareth Davis (2011, Dekorder, LP)
- "Birds in a Box" with Stephen Vitiello (2011, Nuun Records, CD)
- "Mort Aux Vaches" with Peter Broderick and Jan and Romke Kleefstra, Chris Bakker, Nils Frahm (2010, Staalplaat, CD)
- "Bridges" with Gerco Hiddink, Steven Hess, Burkhard Beins, Jon Mueller, Erik Carlsson, Nate Wooley, Mats Gustafsson, Jim Denley and Espen Reinertsen (2011, self-released, double LP picture disc)
- "One Man Nation & Machinefabriek" with One Man Nation (2012, The Unifiedfield, CD)
- "Numa/Penarie" with Celer (2012, self-released, 7-inch with two videos by Marco Douma)
- "Lichtung" with Steve Roden (2012, Eat, Sleep, Repeat, CD)
- "Pierdrie" with Roel Meelkop and Marco Douma (2012, self-released, DVD)
- "Hei/Sou" with Celer (2012, self-released, 7-inch with two videos by Marco Douma)
- "Macrocosms", (2016, Tapu Records), "Entropia" (2019, Eilean Rec), "Cassina (2020, 7K!) with Michel Banabila
- "Sea Of Voices" Rework on the Peter Broderick project The Beacon Sound Choir - Sunday Songs (2016, First Terrace Records, LP)

== Projects ==
=== Installations and site specific work ===
- "Requim voor Polderplanten" installation with STIL Buitenruimtes, for Polderlicht, Amsterdam, Netherlands, 2008
- "Take a Closer Listen" concept, book, postcards about (listening to) environmental sound
- "Loops for Voerman" music for a sculpture by Rob Voerman, project Beyond-Leidsche Rijn, Utrecht, Netherlands, 2010
- "Lichtung" with Steve Roden and Sabine Bürger, multiple channel video, Galerie Vayhinger, Radolfzell, Germany, 2010
- "Ontrafelde Tonen" installation for StreetCanvas, Haarlem, Netherlands, 2010
- "Colour Tales" music for a project by Lesley Moore, inspired by Imants Ziedonis, WM Gallery, Amsterdam, Netherlands, 2011
- "15/15" a piece for Soundpiece, a sound installation at the Schouwburgplein, Rotterdam, Netherlands, 2011
- "Pierdrie" 3 monitor/4 speaker installation with Roel Meelkop and Marco Douma, Galerie Hommes, Rotterdam, Netherlands, 2012
- "Kamermuziek" soundtrack for the machine room of Trouw, for the Stedelijk Museum's Hear It! Festival, Amsterdam, Netherlands, 2012
- "Kamermuziek #2" 3 hour live concert as a soundtrack for a room at TENT's Sound Spectrums event, Rotterdam, 2012
- "Verstilde Tijd", soundtrack for exhibition Het Gebouw at Oud Amelisweerd country house, Bunnik, Netherlands, 2012

=== Music for films, games, dance and theatre ===
- "Intermittent Movements" soundtracks for a series of short films by John Price, an IFFR commission, 2008
- "Studies for a Figure on Stage" music for a performance by Bram Vreeswijk, Amsterdam, 2009
- "EXIT" music for a dance performance by A Two Dogs Company, 2011
- "In Your Star" soundtrack for a film by Makino Takashi, 2011
- "Sol Sketches" music for a Sol LeWitt documentary by Chris Teerink, 2012
- "What is seems to be/wat het lijkt te zijn" music for a film/installation by Sarah Payton, 2012
- "Secret Photographs" music for a film by Mike Hoolboom, about the photographs from Alvin Karpis, 2012
- "Astroneer (original game soundtrack)" music for the game Astroneer, released 2016
