= Celer (group) =

American music group

- Origin: Huntington Beach, California, U.S.
- Genres: Ambient music; drone music
- Years active: 2005–2026
- Members: Will Long
- Past members: Danielle Baquet-Long
- Website: http://www.celer.jp

Celer was an American drone music project formed in 2005 by composer and musician Will Long and Danielle Baquet-Long.

== History ==
Founded in 2005, at the beginning of their relationship in Huntington Beach, California, USA, Celer was created as a musical and artistic collaboration between Danielle Baquet-Long and Will Long.

Between 2005 and 2007, the couple created 22 releases, which they self-released, packaged in handmade, hand-painted packages, with designs, and individual stencils. The handmade packaging designs have been described as "deliciously mysterious", where "Muted and bleach colours stretch as far as the eye can see in these panoramic paintings for the mind", and the music as "deeply personal, or unwittingly obscure", and "gentle, haunting and evocative", created "primarily from personal memories and thought experiments".

After producing music for record labels, installations, and exhibits worldwide from 2005 to 2009, Danielle Baquet-Long died on July 8, 2009, of heart failure. From 2009 to 2026, Celer was the solo ambient project of Will Long.

== Discography ==
=== Albums ===
- White Prism (Self-released, 2004)
- Ariill (Self-released, 2005)
- Belsslsssll (Self-released, 2005)
- Ceylon (Self-released, 2006)
- Continents (Self-released, 2006; Two Acorns re-issue, 2021)
- Descender (Self-released, 2006)
- Melodia (Self-released, 2006)
- Sampling Pond (Self-released, 2006)
- Sunlir/Scols (Self-released, 2006)
- Tingshas (Self-released, 2006)
- Ammonia (Self-released, 2007)
- Cantus Libres (Self-released, 2007; Two Acorns re-issue, 2021)
- Dilue (Diluted) (Self-released, 2007)
- Neon (Self-released, 2007; Two Acorns re-issue, 2021)
- Para (Self-released, 2007)
- Red Seals (Self-released, 2007)
- Sadha (Self-released, 2007; Two Acorns re-issue, 2021)
- Sieline (Self-released, 2007)
- Discourses Of The Withered (Infraction, 2008)
- The Everything And The Nothing (Infraction, 2008)
- Nacreous Clouds (And/oar, 2008)
- Tropical (Mystery Sea, 2008)
- Cursory Asperses (Slow Flow Records, 2008)
- I Love You So Much I Can't Even Title This (The Light That Never Goes Out Went Out) (Self-released, 2008)
- Capri (Humming Conch, 2009)
- Compositions For Cassette (Digitalis Limited, 2009)
- Breeze Of Roses (Dragons Eye Recordings, 2009)
- Engaged Touches (Home Normal, 2009)
- Levitation And Breaking Points (Self-released, 2009)
- Fountain Glider (Students Of Decay, 2009)
- Poulaine (Students Of Decay, 2009)
- Brittle (Low Point, 2009)
- Close Proximity And The Unhindered Care-All (Sentient Recognition Archive, 2009)
- In Escaping Lakes (Slow Flow Records, 2009)
- Pockets Of Wheat (Soundscaping Records, 2010)
- Rags Of Contentment (Digitalis Limited, 2010)
- Dwell In Possibility (Blackest Rainbow, 2010)
- Dying Star (Dragons Eye Recordings, 2010)
- Panoramic Dreams Bathed In Seldomness (Basses Frequences, 2010)
- Honey Moon (Stunned Records, 2010)
- Vestiges Of An Inherent Melancholy (Blackest Rainbow, 2010)
- Salvaged Violets (Infraction, 2010)
- Ever, Irreplaceable Beauty (Self-released, 2011)
- Foolish Causes Of Fail And Ruin (Self-released, 2011)
- Menggayakan (Analog Path, 2011)
- Sunlir (Con-V, 2011)
- Tightrope (Low Point, 2012)
- Evaporate And Wonder (Experimedia, 2012)
- In The Finger-Painted Fields Of The Eyes (Prairie Fire, 2012)
- Dearest Ices (Northern Twilights, 2012)
- Lightness And Irresponsibility (Constellation Tatsu, 2012)
- Epicentral Examples Of The More Or Less (Futuresequence, 2012)
- Redness + Perplexity (Somehow Recordings, 2012)
- Relief and Altruism (Self-released, 2012)
- An Immensity Merely To Save Life (Self-released, 2012)
- Without Retrospect, the Morning (Glacial Movements, 2012)
- Perfectly Beneath Us (Still*Sleep, 2012)
- I, Anatomy (Streamline, 2012)
- Radish (Commune Disc, 2013)
- Viewpoint (Murmur Records, 2013)
- Climbing Formation (Entropy Records, 2013)
- Diving Into the Plasma Pool (Self-released, 2013)
- Voyeur (Humming Conch, 2014)
- Zigzag (Spekk, 2014)
- Sky Limits (Two Acorns, 2014)
- Sky Limits (Baskaru, 2014)
- Jima (I, Absentee, 2015)
- How Could You Believe Me When I Said I Loved You When You Know I've Been A Liar All My Life (Two Acorns and White Paddy Mountain, 2015)
- Tempelhof (Two Acorns, 2015)
- Akagi (Two Acorns, 2016)
- Inside The Head Of Gods (Two Acorns, 2016)
- I Love You So Much I Can't Even Title This (Infraction, 2016)
- Two Days and One Night (Sequel, 2016)
- Callisto (Two Acorns, 2016)
- In The End You'll Just Disappear (Two Acorns, 2017)
- Alcoves (Cellar Door Tapes, 2017)
- Alcoves (Two Acorns, 2017)
- Another Blue Day (Glistening Examples, 2017)
- You and I Can't Ever Change (Self-released, 2018)
- Something Cathartic (Polar Seas Recordings, 2018)
- Shima (Gailur, 2018)
- Nacreous Clouds (Two Acorns, 2018)
- Xièxie (Two Acorns, 2019)
- Plays Godflesh (Avalanche Recordings, 2019)
- Vamps (Patient Sounds, 2019)
- Scols (Two Acorns, 2020)
- Continents (Two Acorns, 2020)
- Sadha (Two Acorns, 2021)
- Cantus Libres (Two Acorns, 2021)
- Malaria (Two Acorns, 2021)
- Coral Sea (Two Acorns, 2021)
- Neon (Two Acorns, 2021)
- In Light Of Blues (Room40, 2021)
- Ceylon (Two Acorns, 2021)
- Voodoo Crowds (Two Acorns, 2021)
- Para (Two Acorns, 2021)
- Sunspots (Two Acorns, 2021)
- Discourses Of the Withered (Two Acorns, 2022)
- Selected Self-releases, 2006-2007 – Box set (Two Acorns, 2022)
- Red Seals (Two Acorns, 2022)
- The Everything and the Nothing (Two Acorns, 2022)
- Sunlir (Two Acorns, 2022)
- Wasted in the Waiting (Cosmic Winnetou, 2023)
- Landmarks w/Forest Management (Constellation Tatsu, 2024)
- There Were More Failures Than This – Box set (Two Acorns, 2024)
- Perfectly Beneath Us (Field Records, 2024)
- It Would Be Giving Up – Box set (Two Acorns, 2024)
- Cursory Asperses (Room40, 2024)
- Engaged Touches (Two Acorns, 2024)

=== Collaborations ===
- Mesoscaphe with Mathieu Ruhlmann (Spekk, 2008)
- Generic City with Yui Onodera (Two Acorns, 2010)
- Maastunnel/Mt. Mitake with Machinefabriek (Self-released, 2012)
- Numa/Penarie with Machinefabriek (Self-released, 2012)
- Greetings From Celer & Machinefabriek with Machinefabriek (Self-released, 2012)
- Hei/Sou with Machinefabriek (Self-released, 2012)
- GAU with CMKK (Celer, Machinefabriek, Romke Kleefstra, Jan Kleefstra) (Monotype, 2013)
- Vain Shapes And Intricate Parapets with Hakobune (Chemical Tapes, 2013)
- Five Years with Yui Onodera (Two Acorns, 2015)
- Symbols with Duenn (Duenn, 2016)
- Background Curtain with Dirk Serries (Monotype, 2016)
- Landmarks with Forest Management (Constellation Tatsu, 2018)

=== Compilations ===
- Memory Repetitions (Smalltown Supersound, 2018)
- Future Predictions (Two Acorns, 2020)

=== EPs, Singles ===
- Canopy (Self-released, 2007)
- Elias (Self-released, 2007)
- Untitled (Frozen Loop (Self-released, 2007)
- Voodoo Crowds (Self-released, 2007)
- Mane Blooms (Low Point, 2009)
- Four Pieces/One (Smallfish, 2009)
- Four Pieces/Two (Smallfish, 2009)
- Four Pieces/Three (Smallfish, 2009)
- Four Pieces/Four (Smallfish, 2009)
- All At Once Is What Eternity Is (Taâlem, 2010)
- Hell Detoured (Rural Colours, 2010)
- Weavings Of A Rapid Disenchantment (Basses Frequences, 2010)
- On Or Near The Surface (Self-released, 2017)
- Being Below (co-released by Two Acorns and Past Inside the Present, 2021)
