= Maggi Payne =

American composer and musician

Maggi Payne (born 1945, Texas, United States) is an American composer, flutist, video artist, recording engineer/editor, and historical remastering engineer who creates electroacoustic, instrumental, vocal works, and works involving visuals (video, dance, film, slides).

== Early life and education ==
Payne was raised in Texas. She received her B. Mus. in applied flute at Northwestern University, studying with Walfrid Kujala, flute, and Alan Stout, Ted Ashford, and M. William Karlins, composers. She received her M. Mus. at the University of Illinois Urbana-Champaign, studying with composers Gordon Mumma, Ben Johnston, and Salvatore Martirano. She studied with Robert Ashley at Mills College, where she received her MFA in electronic music and recording media.

== Career ==
She has collaborated since the 1980s with video artist Ed Tannenbaum, composing several works for his Technological Feets live dance/video-processing performances and built a flame speaker at the Exploratorium in collaboration with Nick Bertoni (1983–1985). Payne has been a recording engineer at Music and Arts record label since 1981, where she has recorded both contemporary and historical music. Her video works include Crystal, Io, Circular Motions, Solar Wind, Airwaves (realities), Liquid Metal, Apparent Horizon, Liquid Amber, Effervescence, Cloud Fields, Quicksilver, and Through the Looking Glass. Her films include Orion and Allusions. Her works involving dance include System Test (fire and ice) and Allusions. Her works have been choreographed by Molissa Fenley, Wendy Rodgers, Gina Gibney, Gail Chodera, Deborah Hay, Carla Blank Reed, and Carolyn Brown.

Payne's works are available on Aguirre, Innova, Root Strata, Lovely Music, Starkland, The Label, Music and Arts, Centaur, Ubuibi, MMC, New World Records (CRI), Digital Narcis, Frog Peak, Asphodel, and/OAR, Capstone, and Mills College labels.

She received two Composer's Grants and an Interdisciplinary Arts Grant from the National Endowment for the Arts, and video grants from the Mellon Foundation and the Western States Regional Media Arts Fellowships Program. She received four honorary mentions from Bourges, one from Prix Ars Electronica, and placed in the Barlow and "Luigi Russolo" per giovani compositor di Musica Elettroacoustica competitions. In 2022 she received the SEAMUS AWARD.

Commissions include 2019 Francisco Lopez for Through Space and Time, 2018 Berkeley Arts Commission 8 channel installation titled Immersion, Bay Area Soundscape, 2015 Jacqueline Gordon BAM, for diffusion over 36 speakers, National Flute Association High School Soloist Competition 2005, flutist Nina Assimakopoulos, pianist Sarah Cahill, trombonist Abbie Conant, Starkland, composer Annea Lockwood, composer/pianist David Mahler, and the Hartt School of Music at Hartford, and several others.

Payne has also had works selected and performed on the 60x60 project for the years 2003, 2004, 2005, and 2006.

She was Co-Director of the Center for Contemporary Music (CCM) at Mills College in Oakland, California from 1992-2018, where she taught recording engineering, composition, and electronic music since the 1980s.

== Discography ==
Solo releases:

- 2017 Crystal LP re-release, Aguirre Records: includes White Night, Scirocco, Crystal, and Solar Wind
- 2014 Desertscapes, for two spatially separated women’s choirs, CD, Lorelei Ensemble, Beth Willer, conductor and artistic director
- 2012 Ahh-Ahh Music for Ed Tannenbaum’s Technological Feets 1984-1987 LP, Root Strata: includes Flights of Fancy, Gamelan, Shimmer, Back to Forth, Ahh-Ahh (ver 2.1), and Hikari
- 2010 Arctic Winds CD (electroacoustic) Innova Recordings: includes Fluid Dynamics, Distant Thunder, Apparent Horizon, Arctic Winds, System Test (fire and ice), Glassy Metals, and FIZZ
- 2003 Ping/Pong: Beyond the Pail CD, And/oar (soundscapes)
- 1991 Crystal re-released on CD, Lovely Music (electroacoustic): includes White Night, Solar Wind, Scirocco, Crystal + additional tracks Ahh-Ahh (ver 2.1), Subterranean Network, Phase Transitions
- 1986 Crystal LP, Lovely Music (electroacoustic): includes White Night, Scirocco, Crystal, Solar Wind

Compilation albums:

- 2017 BAM, on the Acoustic Deconstruction LP, The Label
- 2016 Reflections, for solo flute on VAYU: Multi-cultural Flute Solos From the Twenty-First Century CD, AMP Recordings, Nina Assimakopoulos, flute
- 2015 Beyond, for Steven M. Miller on Between Noise and Silence, Innova Recordings CD/DVD
- 2014 Black Ice and STATIC on Gravity Spells: Bay Area New Music & Expanded Cinema Art DVD/LP handmade boxed set created and curated by John Davis—limited edition
- 2013 Pop on SEAMUS Electro-Acoustic Miniatures 2012: Re-Caged CD, SEAMUS
- 2008 60X3, on the "60x60 (2006–2007)" 2-CD set, Vox Novus
- 2007 System Test (fire and Ice) on the "Far and Wide" DVD, Computer Music Journal (Winter 2007, Vol. 31/No. 4)
- 2007 :60 Fizz (electroacoustic), on the "60x60 (2004–2005)" 2-CD set, Vox Novus
- 2006 ReCycle (electroacoustic), on the "Women Take Back the Noise" CD, Ubuibi
- 2006 Of All for solo flute (Nina Assimakopoulos, flute), on the "Points of Entry: Laurels Project, Volume I" CD, Capstone Records
- 2006 it's elemental (soundscape), on the "Overheard and Rendered" CD, And/oar
- 2005 field recordings edited by Chris Cutler on the "Twice Around the Earth" CD, ReR Megacorp
- 2004 60 Spin (electroacoustic), on the "60X60" CD, Capstone Records, CPS-8744
- 2001 Moiré (electroacoustic) on the soundtrack for Jordan Belson: Collected Films: Bardo
- 2000 White Turbulence 2000 (four channel electroacoustic work), on the "Immersion" DVD-V/DVD-A, Starkland
- 2000 breaks/motors (electroacoustic), on the "Oasis: Music from Mills 2001" CD, Mills College
- 1999 HUM, Aeolian Confluence, and Inflections, on "The Extended Flute" CD, CRI
- 1999 Raw Data (electroacoustic), on the "End ID" CD, Digital Narcis Ltd.
- 1998 Chris Mann Piece (electroacoustic), on "The Frog Peak Collaborations Project" CD, Frog Peak
- 1998 She Began, with text by writer Melody Sumner Carnahan, on "The Time is Now" CD, Frog Peak
- 1996 Desertscapes, for 2 spatially separated choirs, on the "Desertscapes" CD, MMC
- 1996 Moiré (electroacoustic), on the "Storm of Drones" CD, Asphodel Records
- 1994 Resonant Places (electroacoustic), on the "Consortium to Distribute Computer Music (CDCM)—Music from the Center for Contemporary Music (CCM) at Mills College" CD, Centaur
- 1988 Airwaves (realities) (electroacoustic), on the "Another Coast" CD, Music and Arts
- 1986 Subterranean Network, on the "Mills College Centennial" 3-LP album, Mills College
- 1980 Lunar Dusk and Lunar Earthrise (electroacoustic), on the "Lovely Little Records" boxed set of six 7" records, Lovely Music

As performer:

- 1999 flutist on "The Extended Flute" CD, CRI (performing works by Maggi Payne, David Behrman, William Brooks, Mark Trayle, Roman Haubenstock-Ramati)
- 1996 flutist on "Non Stop Flight" by Pauline Oliveros, CD on Music and Arts
- 1981 flutist on Healing Music by Joanna Brouk, Hummingbird Productions
- 1978 flutist and bowed psalter player on "Summer Music" by Jacques Bekaert, LP on Lovely Music
- 1977 flutist on "On the Other Ocean" by David Behrman, LP on Lovely Music (re-released on CD 1996, Lovely Music)
- 1977 flutist on "Star Jaws" by Peter Laurence Gordon, LP on Lovely Music
- 1977 flutist on "Out of the Blue" by Blue Gene Tyranny, LP on Lovely Music (re-released on CD 2007, Unseen Worlds)

== Print publications ==
- 2008 The San Francisco Tape Music Center, 1960s Counterculture and the Avant-Garde by David Bernstein, University of California Press, contribution as interviewer
- 2002 Music with Roots in the Aether, Robert Ashley, article on Gordon Mumma, p. 109-124, written about 1976
- 2000 Desertscapes, for two spatially separated choirs (1991), score published on Treble Clef Music
