= Terri Hanlon =

American media artist

- Born: 1953 (age 72–73)
- Education: California College of the Arts; San Francisco State University
- Known for: Video art
- Spouse: David Behrman (m. 1979)
- Website: http://www.themetropolitanmuseumofterri.info/

Terri Hanlon (born 1953) is an American media artist. She has directed, produced and performed in numerous video and performance works in collaboration with multidisciplinary artists.

== Life and education ==
Hanlon grew up in the San Francisco Bay area. She received a BA in sculpture at the California College of the Arts and an MA in the pioneering Interdisciplinary Arts program at San Francisco State University. Hanlon currently lives in the Hudson Valley, New York with her husband, composer David Behrman.

== Work ==
In the late 1970's Hanlon co-founded the San Francisco performance art group The EVA Sisters with artist Fern Friedman and choreographer Deborah Slater, which toured over a five year period with a repertory of six pieces.

The EVA Sisters collaborated with composer David Behrman to produce an interactive performance art piece, Looking Past the Future, in 1979. Friedman and Hanlon collaborated with composers Paul DeMarinis and David Behrman, and performer Anne Klingensmith to produce the record She's-A-Wild, along with live performance versions in San Francisco and New York.

Hanlon's collaborative piece, E(L)(FF)USIVE, with Fern Friedman was published in Text-Sound Texts. An audio recording version with Robert Gonsalves and Paul Wilson was published in 1978 in Ear Magazine as a “Jello Disk", a flexible sound sheet record.

In 1981, Hanlon moved to New York City, where she made performance art pieceThis Setup No Picnic (1982) with Frankie Mann, Fern Friedman and Julie Lifton. Her short music videos with music by Frankie Mann, Rhys Chatham, and the She's-A-Wild group, were shown on PBS, at CBGB and the Mudd Club in New York, at the Mill Valley Video Festival and in international music and film festivals. Her short pieces You Pay Rent and I Should Have Stayed Home incorporated interactive software by software designer Jonathan Cohen.

In the 1990s, Hanlon made works which incorporated the camera work of Howard Grossman and Marc Kroll, choreographers and performers Eric Barsness and Carol Clements, and music by New York downtown composers. Inversion of Solitude (1993) with sound score by composer Frankie Mann and computer graphics by designer Matthew Duntemann was shown on PBS, at the New York Film Festival and at the American Film Institute.

Meringue Diplomacy (2010) was inspired by the life of the great chef Antonin Carême, premiered at The Alliance Française in New York, and features music of composers David Behrman, Jacques Bekaert, Jon Gibson, Barbara Held, John King, and Laetitia Sonami, with choreography by Carol Clements, and performances by Clements and Eric Barsness. Meringue Diplomacy was shown at Anthology Film Archives, New York, Basilica in Hudson, NY, the Serralves Museum in Porto, Portugal, and streams on UbuWeb Film. Iris print portraits from Meringue Diplomacy were presented at a 2001 show in Barcelona and at the Studio Five Beekman gallery in New York City.

In 2007 and 2008 Hanlon directed a series of composer portraits for Roulette TV.

In 2016 Hanlon produced the documentary The Frog In The Pond about San Francisco artist and art collector Nina Van Rensselaer, which premiered in 2019 at Mills College in Oakland, California.

== Video work ==
- Party Advice from a Young Artist... (1979)
- ¿Dónde está the Donner Party? (1982)
- Context Galore! (1984)
- You Pay Rent (1985)
- Way Downtown (1985)
- I Should Have Stayed Home (1986)
- Sea Ranch - the True Story (1988)
- Inversion of Solitude (1993)
- The Breuer House! (1995)
- The Vanishing Tower (2001)
- I Love You In Spite of the Pain... (2002)
- Composer Portraits for Roulette Intermedium (2007–2008)
- Meringue Diplomacy (2010)
- The Frog In The Pond (2016)

== Audio recordings ==
- E(L)(FF)usive (1978) Jell-O-Disk with Fern Friedman
- She's-A-Wild (1981) Record Records
- She's More Wild (2020) Black Truffle Records. A collaborative project with David Behrman, Paul DeMarinis, Fern Friedman, Terri Hanlon and Anne Klingensmith recorded at Mills College Center for Contemporary Music

== Performance Art work ==
- Narrative Themes/Audio Works, August 1977-October 1977, Los Angeles Institute of Contemporary Art
- What House? (1977) performance work with The EVA Sisters (Fern Friedman, Terri Hanlon, Deborah Slater)
  - La Mamelle Arts Center, San Francisco
  - Western Front Society, Vancouver, BC, Canada
  - White Columns, New York, NY
  - Washington Project for the Arts, Washington D.C.
- Discreet Pitches (1978) performance work with the EVA Sisters. San Francisco Museum of Modern Art, part of The Floating Museum exhibition organized by Lynn Hershman
- Looking Past the Future (1979) interactive performance work as part of The EVA Sisters with composer David Behrman
- She's Wild (1981) with Fern Friedman, composers Paul DeMarinis and David Behrman and performer Anne Klingensmith
  - The Performance Gallery, San Francisco, CA
  - The Kitchen, New York, NY
  - Real Art Ways, Hartford, CT with Fern Friedman, composers Paul DeMarinis and David Behrman and performer Anne Klingensmith
- This Setup No Picnic (1982) in collaboration with Frankie Mann, Fern Friedman and Julie Lifton. University of the Streets, New York, NY
- Meringue Diplomacy (2012) screening with enhanced live soundtrack performance with David Behrman, Eric Barsness and Gisburg, Roulette Xperimental <3 Festival, Brooklyn, NY.

== Grants and fellowships ==
- National Endowment for the Arts New Music Theatre grant (1979)
- National Endowment for the Arts Interdisciplinary Arts grant (1992)

== Interviews ==
- Tone Glow 013: Terri Hanlon
- WGXC Wave Farm: Terri Hanlon discusses her film Meringue Diplomacy
- Interview with David Weinstein on Art International Radio: Meringue Diplomacy with Terri Hanlon and David Behrman (2011)
- Serralves Museum 2022
