= Will Long =

- Also known as: Celer
- Born: William Thomas Long; December 8, 1980 (age 45); Jackson, Mississippi
- Genres: Ambient electronic, house, Acid house, Jungle
- Occupations: Musician, multi-instrumentalist, photographer
- Instruments: Synthesizer, piano, tape
- Years active: 2005–present
- Labels: Self-released, Smalltown Supersound, various others (as Celer)
- Website: http://www.celer.jp/

Will Long (born December 8, 1980) is an American artist and musician. His music is "mostly created using tape loops", "primarily from personal memories and thought experiments", which "capture very specific instances in Long’s life." He is known for his collaboration with Danielle Baquet-Long in the band Celer, and for his continuation of Celer after her death in 2009. He is also known for his work producing deep house music under his own name, described as "deep, expansive affairs, riven with vocal samples culled from political speeches". He has lived in Tokyo, Japan, since 2010.

== Discography ==
- Long Trax (Comatonse Recordings, 2016)
- Long Trax 2 (Smalltown Supersound, 2018)
- Long Trax 3 (Self-released, 2020)
- Behind the Times (Self-released, 2024)
- Acid Trax (Comatonse Recordings, 2024)
- Long Trax 4 (Self-released, 2025)
- Look Anew (Self-released, 2025)
- Seeds To Circumvent Finity (Self-released, 2025)
