= Laetitia Sonami =

Laetitia de Compiegne Sonami
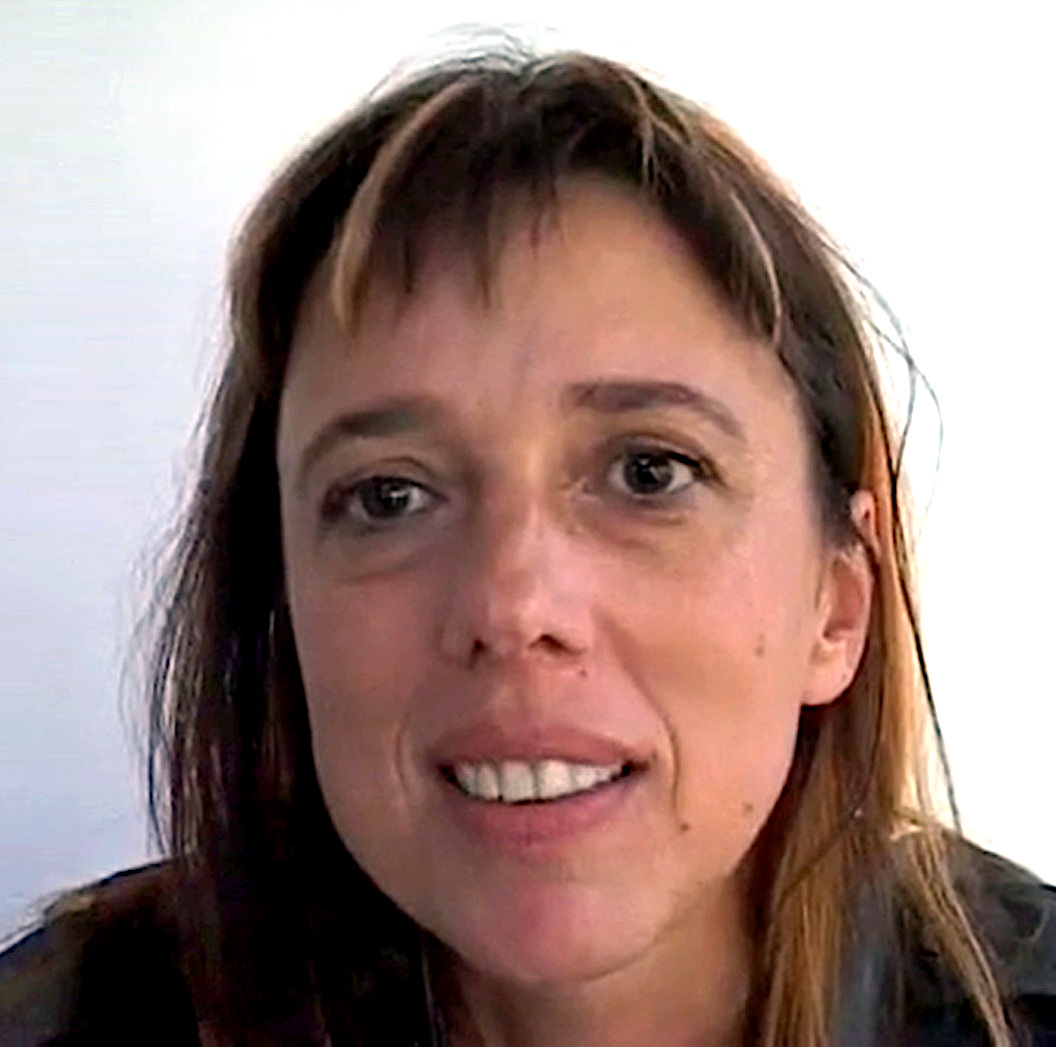
- Laetitia Sonami (c. 2003)

Background information
- Born: 1957 (age 68–69); France
- Genres: Electronic music, sound art
- Website: www.sonami.net

Laetitia Sonami (born 1957 in France), is a sound artist, performer, and composer of interactive electronic music who has been based in the San Francisco Bay area since 1978. She is known for her electronic compositions and performances with the ‘’Lady’s Glove’’, an instrument she developed for triggering and manipulating sound in live performance. Many of her compositions include live or sampled text. Sonami also creates sound installation work incorporating household objects embedded with mechanical and electronic components. Although some recordings of her works exist, Sonami generally eschews releasing recorded work.

== Biography ==
Born in France in 1957, Laetitia Sonami began pursuing her interest in electronic music in the mid-1970s and studied with composers Éliane Radigue (France) and Joel Chadabe (US). She moved to California in 1978 where she studied composition at Mills College in Oakland with Robert Ashley, David Behrman, and Terry Riley. She received an MFA from the Mills College Center for Contemporary Music in 1980. In 1991, she began developing a controller for performance that would become the ‘’Lady’s Glove’’ for which she is widely known in the experimental music world. Sonami has since abandoned performing with the glove controller, citing that "it had been for so many years unclear how I would think of music outside of the Glove." She has built other instruments including the Bellowtron, an infrared sensor-based instrument mounted on a large bellow, one Sonami has prized for its "inefficiency.", and the Spring Spyre, which is dedicated to the applications of machine learning.

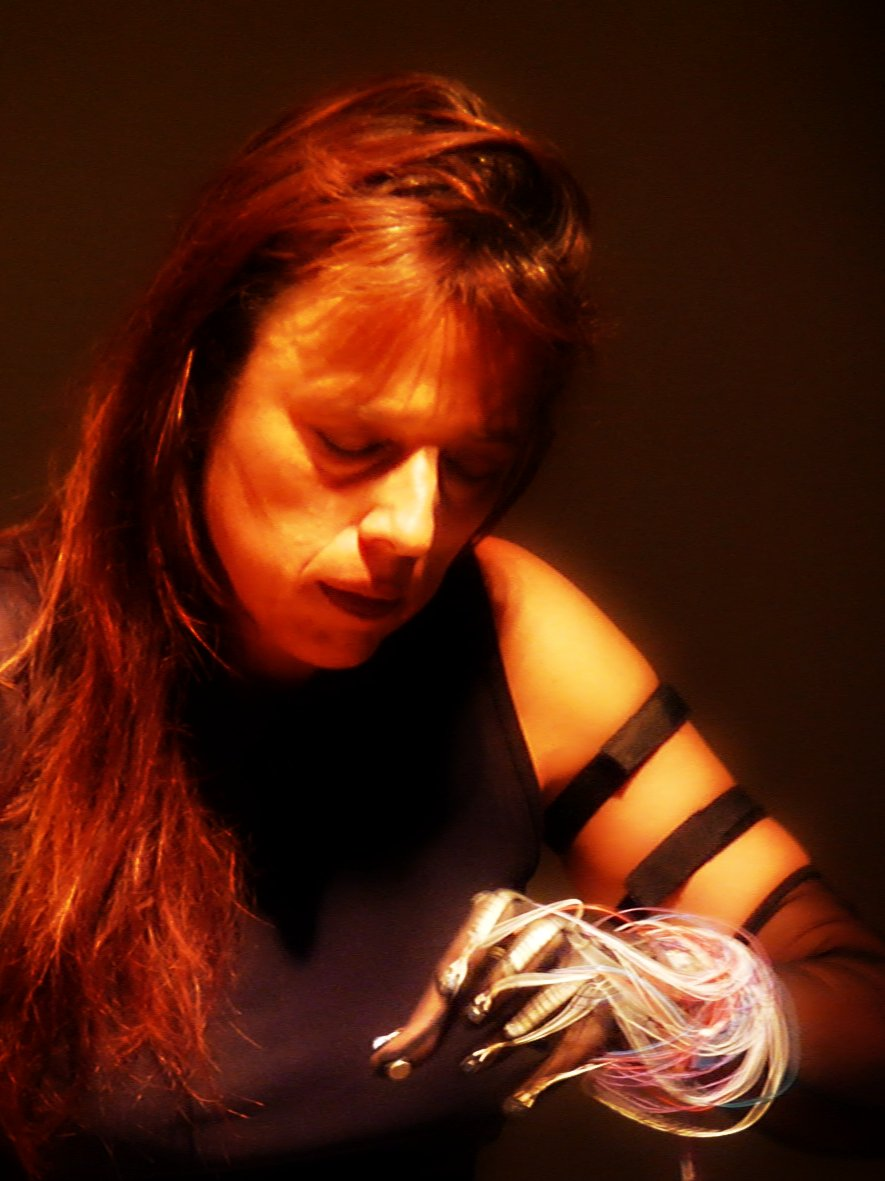
Laetitia in 2009

Since the 1990s, Sonami has given performances and shown installation work in concert venues, museums, and art galleries internationally, including appearances at Ars Electronica (Linz, Austria), the Other Minds Festival (San Francisco), the Interlink Festival (Japan), Lincoln Center Out of Doors (New York), and Internationales Musikerinnen-Festival (Berlin). Sonami received a 2000 Foundation for Contemporary Arts Grants to Artists Award. In 2013, a film about Sonami, ‘‘the ear goes to the sound: The Work of Laetitia Sonami’’, was made by artist Renetta Sitoy. Sonami was sound designer for ¨A Blank Slate,¨ a 2014 film by Sara Eliassen. Sonami teaches sound art at the San Francisco Art Institute.

== The Lady’s Glove ==
Worn on her right hand, Sonami’s instrument “The Lady’s Glove” consists of a black, mesh, evening glove fitted with variety of sensors including micro-switches, transducers, pressure pads, resistive strips, ultrasonic receivers, light sensors, accelerometers, and a miniature microphone. These sensors measure various aspects of hand motion, speed, and proximity, allowing Sonami to send data to her computer to play and manipulate sound and light. The signals from the glove are routed through the Sensorlab, a piece of hardware developed at STEIM in Amsterdam, and are mapped onto MAX MSP software running on Sonami's laptop computer, where her sounds are stored. She created the first one in 1991 for the Ars Electronica festival in Linz, Austria and since then has developed four updated versions.

According to Sonami, the glove was originally conceived as a joke, a form of social commentary on technology, but evolved to become an instrument.

Speaking about her definition of an instrument in the context of The Lady's Glove, she said:

I've been trying to figure out at which point a controller becomes an instrument. I think that when you use or design a controller, and if you're just using it to push buttons of trigger things, it does not really affect the way you think of the music or how you write the software. You have your ideas and you're using a controller as an interface. Then I would not call it an instrument. I think it becomes an instrument when the software starts reflecting and adapting the limitations and possibilities of the controller, and your musical thinking and ideas become more a symbiosis between the controller, the software, and the hardware.

== Spring Spyre ==
In addition to the Lady's Glove, Sonami has developed an instrument called the "Spring Spyre". The Spring Spyre is made of a circular metal ring within which three coiled wires are interwoven. The instrument uses machine learning to control sound synthesis in real-time and makes use of Rebecca Fiebrink's Wekinator software.

== Collaboration ==
External media

Images
- I.C You (working stills)

Video
- Clip of ¨Sheepwoman¨ performance at Los Angeles Contemporary Exhibitions (LACE), 2009

Sonami's works frequently include texts by novelist Melody Sumner-Carnahan. She also has a body of work described as ¨live film,¨ developed in collaboration with video artist SUE-C (Sue Costabile), where the two artists manipulate photographs, handmade motor-driven collages, models, still lifes, remote control train-mounted cameras and assorted lighting and sound effects in real time while computers process the images and deliver them to the audio-visual system with custom software developed in Max/MSP/Jitter. Examples of such work include ¨I.C You¨ (2006), a cinematic thriller based on a script by poet Tom Sleigh ¨about an ice delivery man whose job is to keep America cold,¨ and ¨Sheepwoman,¨ (2009) a live film inspired by Haruki Murakami's novels "A Wild Sheep Chase" and "Dance, Dance, Dance."

She has also made collaborative works with sound artist Paul DeMarinis, electronic music composer David Wessel, and choreographer Molissa Fenley. In 2013, a new work ‘’ OCCAM IX’’ was composed for her by Eliane Radigue, and she premiered the piece at the San Francisco Electronic Music Festival.

== Bibliography ==
- Chadabe, Joel Electric Sound: The Past and Promise of Electronic Music (Prentice Hall, 1997) ISBN 0-13303231-0, pp. 100, 229-230
- Gann, Kyle American Music in the Twentieth Century (Schirmer Books, 1997) ISBN 002864655X, pp. 381, 382
- Marty, Eric San Francisco Contemporary Music Players and CNMAT in Concert, Computer Music Journal, Winter 1998
- Wilson, Stephen Information Arts: Intersections of Art, Science, and Technology. MIT Press 2002, Cambridge MA/ London, England. ISBN 0-262-23209-X. p. 749
- Malloy, Judy, ed. Women in New Media. MIT Press 2003, Cambridge MA/London England. ISBN 0-262-13424-1. pp. 94,356
- Rodgers, Tara Pink Noises: Women on Electronic Music and Sound, Duke University Press Books 2010, ISBN 0822346737. pp. 8, 9–10, 54, 202
- Rutherford-Johnson, Tim (author). (2017). Music after the Fall: Modern Composition and Culture since 1989 . Simpson Imprint in Humanities-University of California Press, Oakland, CA. ISBN 9780520283152. pp. 187–188, 291
