= Danielle Baquet-Long =

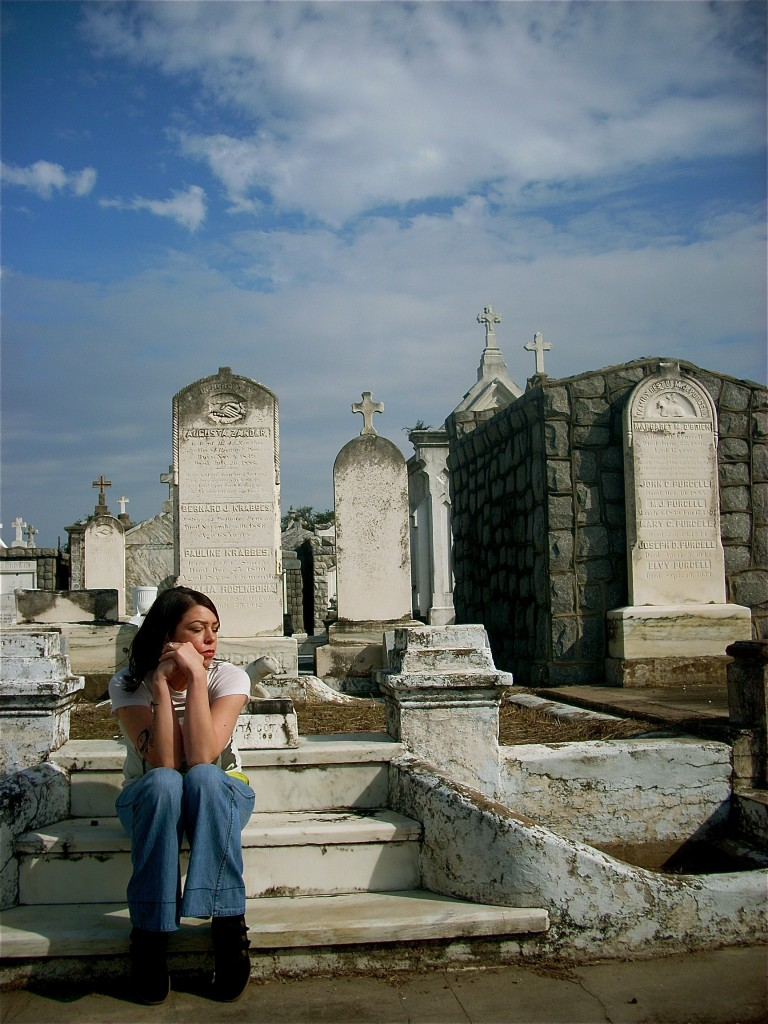

Background information
- Also known as: Chubby Wolf
- Born: Danielle Baquet; July 31, 1982
- Died: July 8, 2009 (aged 26) Huntington Beach, California
- Genres: Electronic, ambient electronic, indie
- Occupations: Music therapist, musician, multi-instrumentalist, vocalist
- Instruments: Synthesizer, guitar, vocals
- Years active: 2005–2009
- Labels: Self-released, Infraction, Slow Flow Records, Spekk, And/oar, Mystery Sea, Dragons Eye Recordings, Low Point, Humming Conch, Sentient Recognition Archive, Digitalis, Home Normal, Students of Decay, Smallfish, Basses Frequences, Blackest Rainbow, Streamline, Murmur Records, Entropy Records

Danielle Baquet-Long (July 31, 1982 – July 8, 2009) was a musician from Huntington Beach, California. She is known for her collaboration with husband Will Long in the band Celer, and for her extensive solo work under the moniker Chubby Wolf (much of which was released posthumously). Danielle was a teacher of special education in music therapy, writer, poet, painter, multi-instrumentalist, and vocalist. Both her self-releases and post-mortem releases under the name Chubby Wolf have gained substantial following and review.

Celer was founded in 2005, in Huntington Beach, California, U.S.A.. After producing music for record labels, installations, and exhibits worldwide from 2005 to 2009, Danielle Baquet-Long died on July 8, 2009, of heart failure. In their time as a duo, they produced numerous self-released albums, sound for installations, and released work for independent labels in North America, Japan, and Europe. Between 2005 and 2007 the couple produced 22 releases. Will Long has continued Celer solo from 2009 to 2022.

== Discography ==
=== Chubby Wolf ===
- Meandering Pupa (Self-released, 2009)
- L'histoire (Self-released, 2009)
- Ornitheology (Self-released, 2010)
- A Wispy Tear (Self-released, 2011)
- The Darker Sex (Self-released, 2011)
- Maudlin & Elusive (Self-released, 2011)
- Los Que No Son Gentos (Self-released, 2011)
- Days to Dismember/The Lows, the Sows (Self-released, 2011)
- Turkey Decoy (Self-released, 2011)
- The Blissful Cessation (Self-released, 2011)
- The Stairway of Abstraction (Self-released, 2011)
- Microcassette Recordings (Self-released, 2012)
- The Last Voices (Self-released, 2013)
- Bouquets of Vacant Jouissance (Live on KCRW) (Self-released, 2013)
- Envelope Petals (Self-released, 2013)
- Seasick (Self-released, 2013)
- It's a Small Place to Be (Self-released, 2013)
