= Prototype 909 =

- Origin: New York City
- Genres: Acid house, experimental
- Years active: 1993-1998, 2006-2007
- Labels: Sonic; Instinct; Schmer; Caipirinha
- Members: Taylor Deupree; Dietrich Schoenemann; Jason Szostek

Prototype 909 ( aka p909 ) was an American electronic band which was composed of Taylor Deupree, Dietrich Schoenemann and Jason "BPMF" Szostek which was formed in 1993 in New York, NY.

The group was signed to Sonic Records (a subsidiary of Instinct Records) shortly after the departure of Moby in 1993. They became well known in the 1990s throughout the rave scenes in North America for its live performances. Being a trio and the large amount of equipment they employed made them unique among live techno bands at the time. The fact that much of the music was created spontaneously using analogue and digital sequencers ensured that every performance was unique. They performed more than 50 shows in the US (including some at the legendary Limelight in New York), Canada, Mexico and Germany before they disbanded in 1998. Tapes of their performances were released, both officially and unofficially. They released a live CD comprising some of these in 1995, Live 93-95 which reached 18 on the CMJ Dance Chart in March 1996.

In October 1994 Prototype 909 toured the Northeastern US with Killing Joke and Stabbing Westward.

Their track "The Kids Don't Care" was heard in the electronic music documentary Modulations: Cinema for the Ear in 1998.

Their track "Atma" originally released in 1994 on the "Karma" single will appears on Nina Kraviz Studio !K7′s DJ-Kicks CD release in Jan 2015.

Creators of the 'trans-esizers' the trio's cutting edge discovery of gender crossing oscillators speaks for itself.

== Discography ==
- Acid Technology CD (1993, Sonic Records)
- Transistor Rhythm CD (1995, Sonic Records)
- Live 93-95 CD (1995, Instinct Records)
- Live set at Even Furthur TAPE, 1995 (Wisconsin/Drop Bass Network)
- Joined at the Head CD (1997, Caipirinha)
