= Joanna Brouk =

- Born: February 20, 1949
- Origin: St. Louis, Missouri U.S.
- Died: April 28, 2017 (aged 68)
- Genres: Electronic music
- Occupation: Electronic composer
- Years active: 1970s-1980s
- Labels: Hummingbird Productions; The Numero Group
- Website: JoannaBrouk.com

Joanna Brouk (February 20, 1949 – April 28, 2017) was an American electronic composer, author, and playwright who was active in the late 1970s and early 1980s.

== Early life ==
Brouk grew up in St. Louis, Missouri. The name "Brouk" is an alternative spelling of the Dutch name "Broek", a cognate with the English word "brook".

She received a B.A. in Creative Writing and Electronic Music from the University of California, Berkeley. Inspired by the cadences of poetry and the human voice, as well as the rhythms and soundings of nature, she began creating music. She went on to receive an M.A. in Electronic Music from Mills College. While at Mills, Brouk studied under Robert Ashley and Terry Riley.

== Career ==
After graduating, she went into radio production, and composed music for documentaries and other programs. Brouk self-released a number of recordings on cassette via her own label, Hummingbird Productions.

Brouk's first release, Healing Music, featured the flute of American composer Maggi Payne. Her 1981 recording, Sounds of the Sea, included field recordings of nature sounds, vocals, and manipulated electronic and acoustic instruments. Brouk's music was known in New Age Music circles but did not receive a great deal of mainstream recognition.

In 2016, a collection of archival recordings and selections from cassette releases, Hearing Music, was released by The Numero Group. In early April, 2017, she made her European debut at Festival Variations in Nantes, France.

== Personal life ==
In 1985, Brouk stopped composing and recording music after moving to San Diego, California, where she married and gave birth to a son, and took up the practice of transcendental meditation. Under the name Joanne (with an "e") Brouk, she became a prolific writer of historical fiction and plays, as well as a notable producer of Internet content. She died on April 28, 2017, at the age of 68.

== Discography ==
- Healing Music (1980)
- The Space Between (1980)
- Sounds Of The Sea (1981)
- Golden Swan (1983)
- The Healing Touch (1986)
- Hearing Music (compilation, 2016)
