= SETI (band) =

- Origin: New York City
- Genres: Ambient; Experimental
- Years active: 1993–1996
- Labels: Instinct
- Members: Savvas Ysatis; Taylor Deupree

Seti is an ambient electronic band, which is a collaboration of Savvas Ysatis and Taylor Deupree (also credited as Taylor808). The duo formed in 1993 in New York City.

The term S.E.T.I. stands for the Search for Extra-Terrestrial Intelligence. This topic is the inspiration for and the central theme of the band's music.

Seti's music is ambient, with few songs containing readily apparent rhythms (those with rhythm tend toward the trip hop–ambient-IDM genres). The mood of the music is pervasively mysterious, grandiose and occasionally spooky; the sounds used are expansive, even alien in nature. Some songs could be considered noise music, as they include white noise and samples from radio telescopes scanning deep space (such as pulsars, radiation, supernovae, and other astronomical phenomena). Many other sounds give the impressions of quiet computers, signals travelling immense distances, garbled radio transmissions, and electrical energies. The net effect of the music is that the listener feels transported to the deep recesses of space, or feels s/he is listening to sounds, transmissions, or events in deep space. Also heard on the album Pharos is a speech given by Frank Drake, one-time president of the SETI Institute and creator of the Drake Equation, who describes the S.E.T.I. project.

The liner notes of the SETI's albums often feature reprints of material from the various SETI projects around the world or short essays by prominent SETI personnel.

== Discography ==
- S.E.T.I (1994, Instinct)
- Pharos (1995, Instinct)
- Song of the Beacon (1995, Instinct)
- Ciphers (1996, Instinct)
