= Taylor Deupree =

American electronic musician

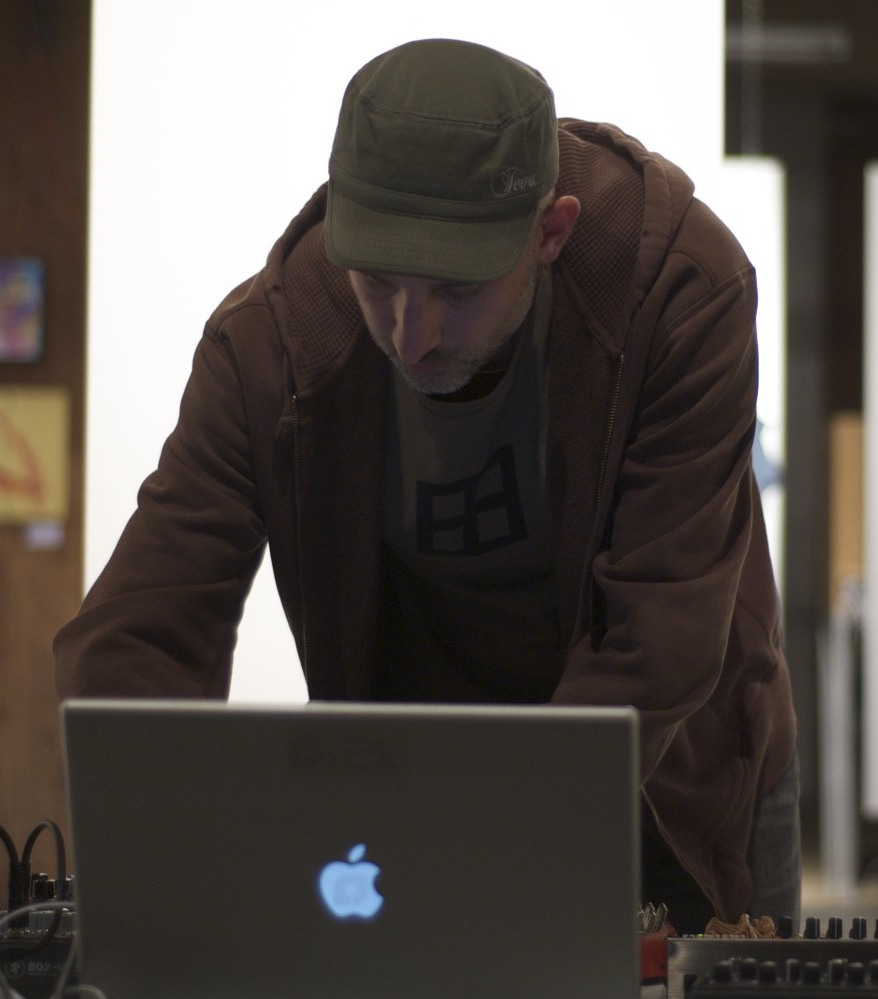
Deupree performing in 2010

Taylor Deupree (born April 30, 1971), is an American electronic musician, photographer, graphic designer and mastering engineer. He is most known for the founding of the 12k record label, along with his work as a member of Prototype 909, and his collaborations with Ryuichi Sakamoto, Marcus Fischer, Stephan Mathieu, Savvas Ysatis, Christopher Willits and others. In 2008, Taylor Deupree was the Président d'Honneur of the Qwartz Electronic Music Awards 5th in Paris (France).

== Mastering engineer (2008–present) ==
Starting with simple mastering duties when he worked as the Art Director for Instinct Records in the late 1990s, Deupree's work as a mastering engineer became a steady job around 2008 when he relocated out of the city. He works in a purpose-built studio every day mastering music for clients of all genres, but often specializing in electronic, experimental, modern classical and other forms of alternative music.

== Human Mesh Dance / Prototype 909 / SETI (the Instinct Records years) (1993–1997) ==
One of Deupree's early solo projects, Human Mesh Dance, which was begun in 1993 and ended in 1997 while he worked as the Art Director for Instinct Records was an ambient project that was a strong contrast to Prototype 909's more mainstream techno sound. He released three albums as Human Mesh Dance, along with appearances on numerous ambient compilations. Also in 1993, Deupree teamed up with Savvas Ysatis, a Greek electronic artist, to create several different projects, each with different sounds. SETI produced ambient electronica, with sounds and words from the various SETI projects from around the world. Futique was the duo's trip hop project, and its Detroit techno output was released under the Arc moniker. In 1996, the duo formed the short-lived label Index, which released only a single 12" EP, containing four tracks by various artists.

== 12k (1997–present) ==
Deupree founded 12k on January 1, 1997, based on the name of the first Arc album, 12k. On the name 12k:

It first came about when Savvas and I named our first Arc CD (on kk records) 12k. We did so because all of the sequencer files for the tracks on the album ended up having file sizes of 12k. It was an intriguing and mysterious title..so we took it for the album. A year later, when i was thinking of label names, I couldn't get 12k out of my head. I was looking for a name that was abstract and technical-sounding, yet at the same time mysterious and would make people wonder what it was about. It was also very important that it had to be easy to say, look good on paper, and be able to be understood and pronounced by virtually anyone in the world, no matter which language they speak. 12k fit all of those requirements.

12k publishes what Deupree refers to as minimalist electronic and acoustic ambient music, which often features a fragile blend of synthetic sounds, tape machines and a range of acoustic instrumentation.

Early productions by 12k were limited to between 500 and 1,000 units, partially because of limited storage space, and also because the small edition size increased the collectability of the albums. Since around 2001, editions became less limited but still started at between 1,000 and 2,000 copies.

== Recent ==
Deupree has stated that he will be focusing on releasing solo music under his own name for the foreseeable future. He has done collaborations with several different experimental artists.

In 2022, Deupree acted as mastering engineer for Alanis Morissette's ambient album The Storm Before the Calm.

In 2024, Deupree collaborated with arranger and producer Joseph Branciforte on Sti.ll, an all-acoustic re-imagining of his 2002 album Stil.. Pitchfork called Sti.ll "revelatory" and "a contemporary classical composition of arresting beauty."

== Bands ==
- Arc (with Savvas Ysatis)
- Drum Komputer (with Schoenemann)
- EOX
- Escape Tank
- Futique (with Savvas Ysatis)
- Human Mesh Dance
- OHIO ( with Corey Fuller)
- Prototype 909 (with Schoenemann, Szostek)
- Seti (with Savvas Ysatis)
- Skai (with Savvas Ysatis)
- Tiny Objects in Space
- Unit Park (with Schoenemann)

=== Collaborations ===
- Joseph Branciforte
- Frank Bretschneider
- Richard Chartier
- Eisi
- Marcus Fischer
- Illuha
- Tetsu Inoue
- Stephan Mathieu
- Kenneth Kirschner
- Christopher Willits
- Sawako
- Ryuichi Sakamoto
- Simon Scott
- Stephen Vitiello

== Discography ==
- Freak Of Nature (1996, Tension)
- Bang Bang Machine (1997, Electric Music Foundation)
- Acid Technology (as Prototype 909) (1993, Sonic)
- Hyaline (as Human Mesh Dance) (1994, Instinct)
- SETI (as SETI) (1994, Instinct)
- Mindflower (as Human Mesh Dance) (1995, Instinct)
- Live '93-'95 (as Prototype 909) (1995, Instinct)
- Pharos (as SETI) (1995, Instinct)
- Transistor Rhythm (as Prototype 909) (1995, Sonic)
- Ciphers (as SETI) (1996, Instinct)
- thesecretnumbertwelve (as Human Mesh Dance) (1997, 12k)
- Joined at the Head (as Prototype 909) (1997, Caipirinha)
- Arc vs. Tiny Objects in Space (1997, 12k)
- Alphabet Flasher (as Drum Komputer) (1998, 12k)
- Tower Of Winds (1998, Caipirinha)
- Comma (1998, 12k)
- SPEC. (1999, 12k)
- .N (2000, Ritornell)
- Active / Freeze (with Tetsu Inoue) (2000, 12k)
- Focux EP (2000, Audio.nl)
- Polr (2000, Raster-Noton)
- invalidObject Series (continue) (2000, Fällt)
- Occur (2001, 12k)
- Tokei EP (2001, Audio.nl)
- Balance (with Frank Bretschneider) (2002, Mille Plateaux)
- Print EP (2002, Audio.nl)
- Stil. (2002, 12k)
- Invisible Architecture #8 (with Christopher Willits) (2003, Audiosphere)
- Post_Piano (with Kenneth Kirschner) (2003, Sub Rosa)
- January (2004, Spekk)
- Mujo (with Christopher Willits) (2004, Plop)
- Every Still Day (with Eisi) (2005, Midi Creative / Noble)
- Live In Japan, 2004 (with Christopher Willits) (2005, 12k)
- Post_Piano 2 (with Kenneth Kirschner) (2005, 12k)
- Northern (2006, 12k)
- Specification. Fifteen (with Richard Chartier) (2006, Line)
- 1am (2006, 12k)
- Landing (2007, Room40)
- The Sleeping Morning (with Savvas Ysatis) (2008, 12k)
- Habitat (as Ando) (2008, Bine Music)
- Transcriptions (with Stephan Mathieu) (2009, Spekk)
- Shoals (2010, 12k)
- Faint (2012, 12k)
- Disappearance (with Ryuichi Sakamoto) (2013, 12k)
- Somi (2017, 12k)
- Fallen (2018, Spekk)
- Mur (2021, Dauw)
- Harbor (2021, laaps)
- Small Winters (2022, Puremagnetik)
- Eev (2023, Nettwerk Records)
- Sti.ll (2024, Nettwerk Records/greyfade/12k)
