= On the Other Ocean =

Studio album by David Behrman
- Released: 1978
- Recorded: June 9th & September 18th, 1977
- Studios: Center for Contemporary Music (Mills College); Electronic Music Studios (State University of New York at Albany)
- Genre: Minimalism
- Length: 42:42
- Label: Lovely Music

David Behrman chronology
| On the Other Ocean (1978) | Leapday Night (1987) |

On the Other Ocean is the debut studio album by the American composer David Behrman, released in 1978 by Lovely Music. Considered a pioneering work of computer music, the album pairs electronics controlled by a KIM-1 computer with live players.

== Recording ==
"On the Other Ocean" was recorded on September 18, 1977, at the Center for Contemporary Music at Mills College in Oakland, California.

"Figure in a Clearing" was recorded on June 9, 1977, at the Electronic Music Studio at the State University of New York at Albany in Albany, New York.

== Release ==
The album was reissued by Lovely Music in 1996 on CD and again on vinyl on February 1, 2019.

== Music ==
Andy Beta of Pitchfork called the title track "a riposte on how humans and computers can interface and interact to make a warm, heavenly sound. It marks Behrman’s first interactive piece between man, woman, and machine; flautist Maggi Payne and bassoonist Arthur Stidfole flutter and slowly move between a series of six pitches, which in turn trigger Behrman’s KIM-1, which reacts and pitch shifts these pure tones so as to harmonize with its human counterparts." Unlike "On the Other Ocean", the electronic portion of "Figure in a Clearing" is not interactive; cellist David Gibson improvised on a set of six pitches in response to a pre-programmed series of chords triggered by the KIM-1, the time intervals between which were "modelled on the motion of a satellite in falling elliptical orbit about a planet."

Gene Tyranny, who engineered the recording of the title track, called it "music...of a holy place, an oasis outside the rush of linear time" in a retrospective review of the album for AllMusic.

== Critical reception ==
Professional ratings
Review scores
| Source | Rating |
|---|---|
| AllMusic | 4.5/5 stars |
| Christgau's Record Guide | A− |
| Exclaim! | 9/10 |
| Pitchfork | 9.0/10 |
| DownBeat | 4/5 stars |

In a retrospective review, Andy Beta of Pitchfork said, "Over 40 years after its initial release, [Behrman's] pioneering work pairing computers with live players feels not only prescient but also refreshingly optimistic." In a separate piece on the album for the site's 2016 list of "The 50 Best Ambient Albums of All Time", he opined that the music "couldn’t be more transportive and lovely; time melts away as soloists and microcomputer move at an unhurried pace, reveling in the resultant honeyed tones."

Nilan Perera of Exclaim! praised the record, saying: "What both pieces excel in is a rich, organic, complexity that on the surface may be considered 'ambient,' but eschews that convention in the most artful way. This recording has achieved landmark status in New Music and it's easy to hear why."

DownBeat magazine awarded four out of five stars to the release in 1979. Reviewer Jon Balleras wrote, "Behrman's probing into this particular musical texture is quietly relentless, a kind of slow motion electronic analogy of [John] Coltrane’s delving into the implications of a single chord/mode".

=== Accolades ===
| Publication | Rank | List |
|---|---|---|
| Pitchfork | 29 | The 50 Best Ambient Albums of All Time |

== Legacy and influence ==
An excerpt of "On the Other Ocean" was featured on Late Night Tales: Belle and Sebastian Vol. II. a 2012 DJ mix compilation album by Belle and Sebastian.

In 2017, Robin Pecknold of Fleet Foxes selected "On the Other Ocean" in his "Bedtime Mix" for Phil Taggart on BBC Radio 1.

American choreographer Molissa Fenley has used "On the Other Ocean" and "Figure in a Clearing" in her work.

== Track listing ==
All tracks are written by David Behrman.

| No. | Title | Length |
|---|---|---|
| 1. | "On the Other Ocean" | 23:30 |
| 2. | "Figure in a Clearing" | 19:12 |
| Total length: | | 42:42 |

== Personnel ==
Credits adapted from liner notes.

- David Behrman – composition, KIM-1 computer, electronics
- Arthur Stidfole – bassoon (on "On the Other Ocean")
- Maggi Payne – flute (on "On the Other Ocean")
- "Blue" Gene Tyranny – engineering (on "On the Other Ocean")
- David Gibson – cello (on "Figure in a Clearing")
- Richard Lainhart – engineering (on "Figure in a Clearing")
- Ariel Peeri – jacket design
