= Sawako =

- Gender: Female

Origin
- Origin: Japanese
- Meaning: Different meanings depending on the kanji used

Sawako (written: 佐和子, 沢子, 爽子 or さわ子) is a feminine Japanese given name. Notable people with the name include:

- Sawako Agawa (阿川 佐和子; born 1953), Japanese writer and television personality
- Sawako Ariyoshi (有吉 佐和子; 1931–1984), Japanese writer
- Sawako Hata (秦 佐和子; born 1988), Japanese singer and idol
- Sawako Yasumoto (安本 紗和子; born 1990), Japanese football player
- Sawako Shimono (下野 佐和子), Japanese retired professional wrestler

== Fictional characters ==
- Sawako Kuronuma (黒沼 爽子), protagonist of the manga series Kimi ni Todoke
- Sawako Yamanaka (山中 さわ子), a character in the manga series K-On!

== See also ==
- Sawako Decides, a 2009 Japanese film
