= Christopher DeLaurenti =

American musician (born 1977)

Christopher DeLaurenti (born 1977) is a Seattle-based composer, improvisor and phonographer. A new music rabble-rouser, he also writes music reviews and articles. His electro-acoustic works are composed of field recordings and often deal with political issues, political protests in particular. His weekly column, The Score, appeared in the Seattle alt-weekly The Stranger from 2002 to 2010. His writings have also appeared in 21st Century Music, The Seattle Times, Signal to Noise, Soundscape, Earshot Jazz, and Tablet.

DeLaurenti is currently a visiting assistant professor at the College of William & Mary in Williamsburg, Virginia.
