= Allou =

Allou is a surname. Notable people with the surname include:

- Amandine Allou Affoue (born 1980), Ivorian sprinter
- Bernard Allou (born 1975), Ivorian-French footballer
- Gilles Allou (1670–1751), French painter

== See also ==
- Alou (disambiguation)
