= Aernoudt Jacobs =

Belgian composer, sound artist, and architect

- Born: 1968; Wilrijk, Belgium
- Genres: sound art
- Website: http://www.tmrx.org/

Aernoudt Jacobs (born 1968 in Wilrijk, Belgium) is a Belgian composer, sound artist, and trained architect. His sound artwork is a result of field recordings where sounds are gathered that are used in his compositions. Jacobs aims to create sounds which invoke memories, feelings and specific circumstances to remind the listener of certain moods.
