= Christopher Willits =

American musician and artist

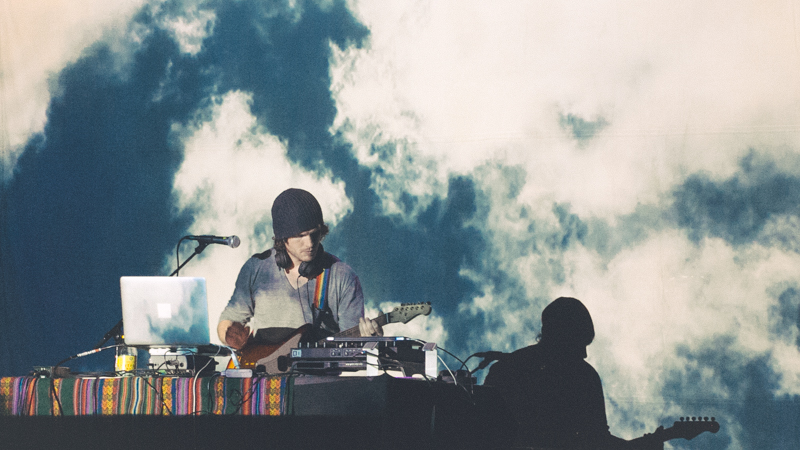
- Christopher Willits in 2014

Background information
- Origin: Kansas City, Missouri, United States
- Genres: Electronic; glitch; ambient; electroacoustic; experimental
- Occupations: Musician; artist; filmmaker; record producer
- Instruments: Guitar; computer; electronic musical instruments; vocals; percussion; synthesizer
- Years active: 1993–present
- Labels: Ghostly International; 12k; Overlap
- Website: www.christopherwillits.com

Christopher Willits (born April 8, 1978) is a San Francisco-based guitarist, electronic music composer and producer, visual artist and scholar. His music is electroacoustic in nature, in that both analogue and digital sounds are meshed into one singular sound.

== Biography ==
Born in Kansas City, Missouri, Willits began playing guitar when he was about 13. He got his first guitar after a football game when, out of the blue, his father suggested they buy one for him. He had played piano as a child, but up to this point, his main interest had been sports. "I couldn't really stand piano. It felt too boxy and classical," he remembers. "I loved that dynamic energy of sports and the improvisation... I played everything; soccer, baseball, basketball. ... That's really where my understanding of improvisation and teamwork came in."

With his own guitar, he began playing all the time, trying to figure out the solos that he heard on his Jimi Hendrix records, and then forming bands in the psychedelic vein. Also a visual artist, he attended the Kansas City Art Institute, where he studied painting, then came to Mills College in California where he studied with Fred Frith and Pauline Oliveros. An ambient album released while still in college on Taylor Dupree's 12K label launched his solo career.

Willits is also skilled computer programmer. To create his soundscapes, he uses his own custom software and accompanies his live performances with interactive visuals.

The Kansas City native came to the Bay Area in 2000 (After a painting scholarship at KCAI)and received a master's degree in electronic music at Mills College where he studied with Fred Frith and Pauline Oliveros. Along the way, he advanced his skills in photography, cinematography and new media.

Willits completed a master's degree in electronic music at Mills College.

Willits, as a solo artist or in collaboration, has released music on the following record labels: 12k (US), Ghostly International (US), Fällt(Ireland), Sub Rosa (Belgium), Ache Records (Canada), Yacca (Japan) and Plop (Japan). He has toured throughout Europe, America, Mexico, Canada, Australia, China, Thailand, and Japan.

Willits has participated in numerous projects, including collaborations with Ryuichi Sakamoto, Tycho, Zach Hill (drummer from the band Death Grips and Hella), Kid606, Brad Laner (Medicine), Nate Boyce, Latrice Barnett (singer/songwriter and bassist for Handsome Boy Modeling School), Taylor Deupree (12k record label founder), Scott Pagano (visual artist and motion graphics designer), Matmos. Willits is also the founder and director of the record label and community building organization Overlap.

In 2023, Willits remixed Kenneth James Gibson’s track Poured Semi Silently Upon You for the remix album Further Translations on Gibson’s label Meadows Heavy Recorders. Also featured on the album is Jack Dangers, Brian McBride, Scanner, and others.

== Education ==
Willits regularly teaches workshops on spatial audio, music production, the creative process, and leadership. He has taught at California College of the Arts (CCA), San Francisco Art Institute (SFAI), Berkeley City College (BCC), The Art Institute San Francisco, Norcal DJMPA, Sound Arts, the Bay Area Video Coalition and Goucher College.

Willits is also a meditation teacher teaching at The Center (cite ), Habitas, Envelop SF, and his own private workshops.

== Instruments and Tools ==
Willits plays a custom Moog guitar. Along with various outboard gear and uses Ableton Live with Max for Live, and Touch Designer for video processing.

== Envelop ==
Willits is the executive director of Envelop, a nonprofit organization that amplifies the connective power of music through immersive audio venues, and open source spatial audio production software.

== Overlap ==
Christopher Willits directs the creative collective http://overlap.org which is involved in creative community building events and runs a studio in Oakland, California.

== Folding ==
Willits' guitar lines and harmonies are folded into each other using custom-designed software (Willits uses the term "folding" to describe the non-linear, real-time indexing, cutting and re-sampling of guitar and voice).

Willits, in an interview, further expanded on the term 'folding,' "It has a lot to do with time. I actually wrote a whole thesis about this, if you want to go to the Mills library and check it out [laughs]. It's a very simple process of recording something to memory and then indexing at different points. But instead of it being a granular process [a form of synthesis in which a sample is separated into 'grains'], I'm actually skating to different locations within this memory. So there's this continuous rupture of time that creates these rhythmic patterns, so these melodic patterns start to emerge out of this time processing technique."

== Discography ==
- New Moon (Ghostly International) - 2025
- Gravity (Ghostly International) - 2022
- Sunset (Ghostly International) - 2019
- Horizon (Ghostly International) - 2017
- The Art of Listening (An Original Score Soundtrack) (self-released) - 2014
- Opening (Ghostly International) – 2014
- Ancient Future (Ghostly International) - 2012
- GOLD (Overlap) – 2011
- Live on Earth – Vol. 3 (self-released) – 2011
- Tiger Flower Circle Sun (Ghostly International) – 2010
- Live on Earth – Vol. 2 (self-released) – 2009
- Live on Earth – Vol. 1 (self-released) – 2009
- Plants and Hearts (Room40) – 2007
- Surf Boundaries (Ghostly International) – 2006
- Pollen (Fallt) – 2003
- Little Edo (Nibble) – 2003
- Folding, and the Tea (12k) – 2002
- :plateaus, centers, stoma... (self-released CDR) – 2001
- storks and wires (self-released CDR) – 2000

=== Collaborations and band projects ===
- Willits + Sakamoto (Christopher Willits and Ryuichi Sakamoto) – Ancient Future (Ghostly International) – 2012
- Boyce + Matmos + Willits - Subconscious Attraction Strategies (2011)
- Willits + Sakamoto (Christopher Willits and Ryuichi Sakamoto) – Ocean Fire (Commmons/12k) – 2008
- Christopher Willits + Taylor Deupree – Listening Garden (Line) – 2007
- The North Valley Subconscious Orchestra – The Right Kind of Nothing (Ghostly International) – 2006
- Christopher Willits + Taylor Deupree – Live in Japan 2004 (12k) – 2005
- Flössin – Lead Singer (Ache Records, Yacca) – 2004
- Christopher Willits + Taylor Deupree – Mujo (Plop) – 2004
- Christopher Willits + Taylor Deupree – AS08 (Sub Rosa, Audiosphere) – 2003
- Saturn 138 (HWTBL) – 1998

=== Remixes ===
- Tycho - Montana (Christopher Willits Remix)
- The Glitch Mob - The Clouds Breathe for You (Christopher Willits Remix)
- Harold Budd - Olancha Hello (Christopher Willits Remix)
- Alejandro Bento - Heartbeat (Christopher Willits Remix)
- Clarinet Factory - Nautilus (Christopher Willits Remix)
- Tmymtur - 050912/0 (Christopher Willits Remix)

=== Compilations ===
- Various artists – Idol Tryouts (Ghostly International) – 2006
- Various artists – SMM vol.2 – Breathe in Seven Sections (Ghostly International) – 2004
- Various artists – E*A*D*G*B*E – Seven Machines For Summer (12k) – 2003
