= Trente Oiseaux =

Record label

- Founded: 1995
- Founder: Bernhard Günter
- Official website: trenteoiseaux.bandcamp.com

Trente Oiseaux is a record label founded by experimental musician Bernhard Günter in 1995.

Early releases featured musicians such as Francisco López, Roel Meelkop, John Duncan, Jim O'Rourke, Daniel Menche and Günter himself.

A bout of ill health forced Günter to slow down operations in the late 1990s, however the label made a comeback in 1999 and has continued to be a prolific label in the field of minimalist music.

== See also ==
- List of record labels
