= Brandon LaBelle =

American Sound Artist and Theorist

- Born: Brandon James LaBelle; October 23, 1969 (age 56); Los Angeles, California, USA
- Education: California Institute of the Arts (BFA, MFA)

Brandon LaBelle (born October 23, 1969) is an American artist and sound theorist whose work has influenced the field of sound studies. LaBelle has served as Professor in New Media Art in the Faculty of Fine Art, Music and Design at the University of Bergen since 2011. LaBelle is best known for his books Background Noise: Perspectives on Sound Art and Acoustic Territories: Sound Culture and Everyday Life which are important texts in the sound studies canon. David Byrne, founding member and lead singer of American rock band Talking Heads, listed Acoustic Territories as one of his favorite books about music, including it in a collection of books Byrne curated for London's 2019 Meltdown Festival.

== Early life and education ==
Brandon LaBelle was born on October 23, 1969, in Los Angeles, California. He attended Palos Verdes High School. As a drummer, LaBelle took part in the Los Angeles punk rock scene in the 1980s and 90s where he developed "an experimental relation to noise." He graduated with a BFA in 1992, followed by an MFA in 1998 from California Institute of the Arts. In 2005, he was awarded his PhD from the London Consortium.

== Career ==
LaBelle's first exhibitions date from 1995, the year when he also published his first noteworthy papers and gave his first performances as a sound artist. In 2006, LaBelle published Background Noise: Perspectives on Sound Art. In 2010, he published Acoustic Territories: Sound Culture and Everyday Life.

== Selected publications ==
- Background Noise: Perspectives on Sound Art (2006)
- Acoustic Territories: Sound Culture and Everyday Life (2010)
- Lexicon of the Mouth: Poetics and Politics of Voice and the Oral Imaginary (2014)
- Sonic Agency: Sound and Emergent Forms of Resistance (2018)
- Acoustic Justice: Listening, Performativity, and the Work of Reorientation (2021)
