= Romke Kleefstra =

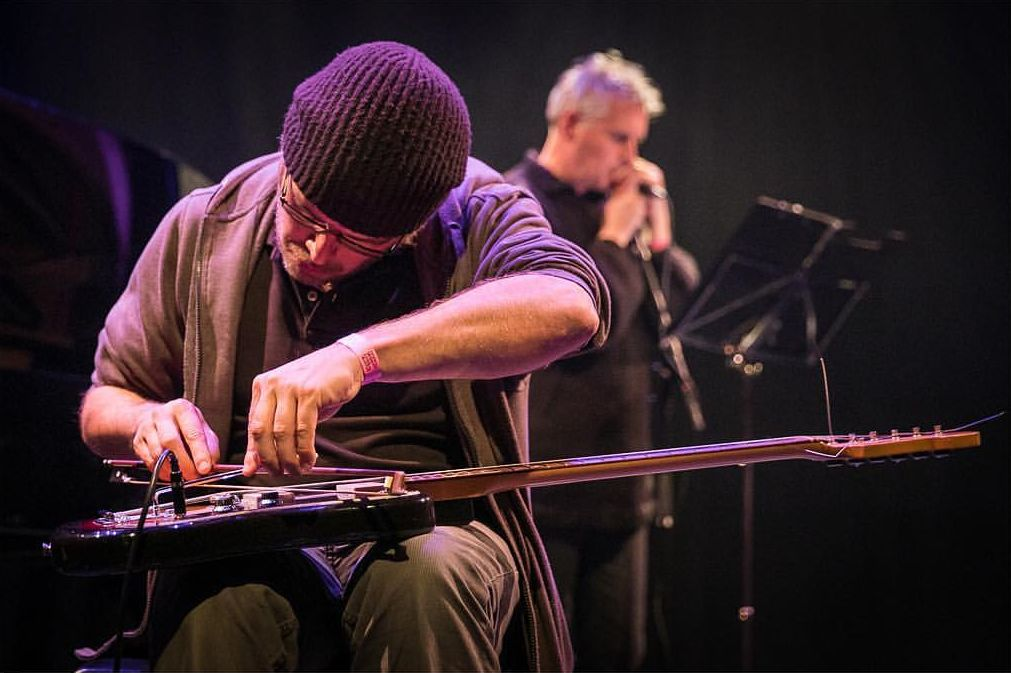
- Kleefstra performing live with The Alvaret Ensemble at the State X New Forms Festival in the city of The Hague, Dec. 10, 2016

Background information
- Born: Romke Kleefstra; 28 July 1972 (age 53); Akkrum, Netherlands
- Genres: Experimental, Dark Ambient, electronica
- Instruments: guitar, bass
- Years active: 1992–present
- Labels: Denovali, Low Point, Monotype Records, Midira
- Website: https://romkekleefstra.blogspot.nl/

Romke Kleefstra is a musician from the Netherlands. Currently he is a member of Transtilla, Piiptsjilling and The Alvaret Ensemble.

== Biography ==
Romke Kleefstra was born on 28 July 1972 in Akkrum, Netherlands. From 1992 up to 2007 Kleefstra was singer and songwriter in the indie bands Shatterhole (1992–1995), Seascape Painters (1995–2000) and Polaroyd (2003–2007). In 2008 Kleefstra formed Piiptsjilling with his brother Jan Kleefstra (poet), Rutger Zuydervelt (Machinefabriek) and Mariska Baars (Soccer Committee). Since then he's been in numerous collaborations and projects with his brother, in which his music contains elements of ambient, post-rock, minimalism, drone, modern classical music up to free impro jazz. After releasing Piiptsjilling's first album in 2008 a solid stream of CD's, LP's, DVD's and cassettes followed on labels like Experimedia, Hybernate, Home Normal, Spekk, Low Point, Monotype, Denovali, Midira and Tombed Visions. Besides Piiptsjilling, Romke Kleefstra is a permanent member of groups like The Alvaret Ensemble and Transtilla.

As a member of Piiptsjilling Kleefstra co-initiated the film and music project Seeljocht for the Into The Great Wide Open festival in 2011 (Vlieland, Netherlands), with Piiptsjilling, Peter and Heather Broderick, Nils Frahm and Greg Haines. It was succeeded by the half-Icelandic project Skeylja for the Oerol festival 2012 (with The Alvaret Ensemble and Kira Kira, Eríkur Ólafsson, Ingi Erlendsson and Borgar Magnason). In 2015 the Frisian collective Tsjinlûd toured the Netherlands with Japanese film artists of the +Project from Tokyo. In 2016 the Kleefstra's did the same with a similar project called Ljerke, including the Norwegian musicians Alexander Rishaug, Hilde Marie Holsen and Michael Duch. In 2018 Piiptsjilling teamed up with Sylvain Chaveau, Joacim Badenhorst and Annelies Monseré in the project Fean. In 2021 the Kleefstra brothers started a four year artist in residence project called IT DEEL, collaborating with Jacaszek in 2021, Streifenjunko in 2022, and Karen Willems in 2023. Visual artists that worked together in projects with the Kleefstra's are 33one3rd, Haraldur Karlsson, Kei Shichiri, Marco Douma, Rei Hayama, Sabine Bürger, Shinkan Tamaki and Takashi Makino.

== Discography ==
=== Shatterhole ===
- Mental Paradox (cassette, Bogmen Inc., 1993)
- Swell Life (cassette, Bogmen Inc., 1994)

=== Seascape Painters ===
- Seascape Painters (cd ep, Homebase Records, 1996)
- Polder EP (cassette, Craneland Music, 1998)

=== Polaroyd ===
- Thaw (3" cd, self-release, 2003)
- Underworld (3" cd, self-release, 2003)

=== Piiptsjilling ===
- Piiptsjilling (cd, Onomatopee, 2008)
- Wurdskrieme (lp/cd, Experimedia, 2010)
- Molkedrippen (cd, Spekk, 2014)
- Moarntiids (cd, Midira, 2014)
- Slieperswaar (3" live cd, self-release, 2015)
- Kjeld (3" live cd, self-release, 2017)
- Fiif (cd, Peter Foolen Editions, 2017)
- in spoar (cd, Cloudchamber Recordings, 2023)

=== Kleefstra|Bakker|Kleefstra ===
- Wink (cd, Appollolaan, 2009)
- Griis (lp, Low Point, 2012)
- Nacht en Dei (DVD, self-release, 2012)
- Live March 2012 (cassette, Northern Twilights, 2012)
- Sinne op 'e Wangen (DVD, Galerie Vayhinger, 2014)
- Dage (cassette, Low Point, 2016)
- Desimber (cassette, Tombed Visions, 2016)
- Dize (cd, Midira Records, 2017)

=== Gareth Davis, Jan Kleefstra, Romke Kleefstra ===
- Sieleslyk (3" cd, Rural Colours, 2011)
- Tongerswel (cd, Home Normal, 2011)

=== Kleefstra|Pruiksma|Kleefstra ===
- Deislieper (cd, Hibernate, 2011)

=== Kleefstra|Pruiksma|Kuitwaard|Kleefstra ===
- Sinneplakken (cd, Time Released Sound, 2012)

=== The Alvaret Ensemble ===
- The Alvaret Ensemble (2lp/2 cd, Denovali, 2012)
- Skeylja (lp/cd, Denovali, 2014)
- Ea (2lp/cd, Laaps, 2020)

=== CMKK ===
- GAU (cd, Monotype, 2013)

=== Tsjinlûd ===
- Tsjinlûd (book + cd, self-release, 2016)

=== Ljerke ===
- Ljerke (cd, Eilean Records, 2018)

=== Fean ===
- Fean (cd, Moving Furniture Records, 2018)
- Fean II (lp/cd, Laaps, 2020)

=== Kleefstra Bros ===
- It Goeshoes (download, self-release, 2018)

=== Transtilla ===
- Transtilla I (cd, Opa Loka Records, 2019)
- Transtilla II (cd, Midira Records, 2019)
- Transtilla III (lp, Midira Records, 2023)

=== IT DEEL ===
- Jacaszek, Romke Kleefstra, Jan Kleefstra - IT DEEL I (lp, Moving Furniture Records, 2022)
- Eivind Lønning, Espen Reinertsen, Romke Kleefstra & Jan Kleefstra - IT DEEL II (lp, Moving Furniture Records, 2023)
- Karen Willems, Romke Kleefstra & Jan Kleefstra - IT DEEL III (lp, Moving Furniture Records, 2024)
- Joana Guerra, Maria Do Mar, Romke Kleefstra & Jan Kleefstra - IT DEEL IV (lp, Moving Furniture Records, 2025)

=== Various ===
- That It Stays Winter Forever (cd, White Box, 2010), with Kleefstra|Bakker|Kleefstra
- Mort Aux Vaches (cd, Staalplaat, 2011), with Kleefstra|Bakker|Kleefstra
- Seeljocht (cd, Into The Great Wide Open, 2011), with Piiptsjilling
- Elements I-V (5 cd, Home Normal, 2014), with Piiptsjilling
- Stay Tuned (cd, Baskaru, 2014)
- Past Disappears (download, Dronarivm, 2014), with Piiptsjilling
- Moving Noises II (download, Midira, 2015), with Piiptsjilling
- Into The White (download, Dronarivm, 2016), with Kleefstra|Bakker|Kleefstra
- Eilean 92 (cd, Eilean Records, 2018), with Ljerke
- Matter Affect (3cd, Esc. Rec., 2022), with FEAN

== Projects ==
- Seeljocht; artist in residence for Into The Great Wide Open Festival 2011 (Isle of Vlieland), also on Explore The North Festival (city of Leeuwarden) and Le Guess Who? (city of Utrecht)
- Skeylja; artist in residence for Oerol Festival (Isle of Terschelling)
- Duif, film by Dinanda Luttikhedde and music project with the Kleefstra's and Mike Kramer, for Cultura Nova Festival (city of Heerlen) and Noorderzon Performing Arts Festival (city of Groningen), also on Explore The North Festival (city of Leeuwarden)
- Klanklânskippen Japan; touring film and music project, also on Noordelijk Film Festival (city of Leeuwarden)
- Ljerke; touring film and music project, also on Le Guess Who? Festival (city of Utrecht (and Noordelijk Film Festival (city of Leeuwarden)
- IT DEEL; four year artist in residence project with Jacaszek (2021), Streifenjunko (2022) and Karen Willems (2023)
