= Pharos (album) =

Studio album by Seti
- Released: January 1995
- Recorded: Aquasphere, Autumn 1994
- Genre: Ambient, Experimental
- Length: 108:10
- Label: Instinct Ambient; AMB 001
- Producer: Seti

Seti chronology
SETI (1994)	Pharos (1995)	Ciphers (1996)

Professional ratings
Review scores
Source	Rating
Allmusic	link

Pharos is the second studio album by the experimental ambient group Seti, which was released in 1995.

== Track listing ==
=== Disc 1: "Arecibo" ===
1. ".beacon01" – 18:53
2. ".beacon02" – 6:17
3. ".beacon03" – 6:20
4. ".beacon04" – 4:34
5. ".beacon05" – 6:07
6. ".beacon06" – 6:54
7. ".beacon07" – 4:47

=== Disc 2: "Phoenix" ===
1. ".beacon08" – 11:31
2. ".beacon09" – 4:04
3. ".beacon10" – 7:15
4. ".beacon11" – 2:11
5. ".beacon12" – 5:39
6. ".beacon13" – 9:25
7. ".beacon14" – 14:06

== Notes ==
The liner notes contain a short introduction to SETI written by Frank Drake, an essay by Madison Blue, and descriptions of the Arecibo message, the Drake equation, Project Phoenix, and a history of SETI in NASA.

The recorded 1974 Arecibo message is also found in the music itself, as are recordings of radio telescopes receiving various types of pulsars. The track ".beacon01" features the voice of Frank Drake giving an introduction to the SETI project.
