= Lowercase (music) =

Form of ambient minimalist music

- Stylistic origins: Ambient; experimental; minimalist; noise
- Cultural origins: Los Angeles, California, United States
- Derivative forms: Onkyokei

Lowercase is an extreme form of ambient minimalism in which very quiet sounds are amplified to extreme levels. Minimal artist Steve Roden popularized the movement with an album entitled Forms of Paper, in which he made recordings of himself handling paper in various ways. These recordings were commissioned by the Hollywood branch of the Los Angeles Public Library.

== Definition ==
Steve Roden stated this about the lowercase tendencies which he began to develop in his later works: “It bears a certain sense of quiet and humility; it doesn't demand attention, it must be discovered... It’s the opposite of capital letters—loud things which draw attention to themselves.”

== See also ==
- John Cage
- Microsound
- Musique concrète
- Postminimalism
- Tape music
