= Ciphers (album) =

Studio album by SETI
- Released: October 8, 1996
- Recorded: Summer 1996
- Studio: Aquasphere
- Genre: Ambient, Experimental
- Length: 60:42
- Label: Instinct
- Producer: SETI

SETI chronology
| Pharos (1995) | Ciphers (1996) |

Professional ratings
Review scores
| Source | Rating |
|---|---|
| Allmusic | 4/5 stars |

Ciphers is an ambient music album by SETI which was released in 1996. It is Ysatis and Deupree's last release under the SETI moniker. This album also features trip-hop and jazz influences, as found in their contemporary Futique releases.

== Track listing ==
1. "Fragment.01" – 6:41
2. "Fragment.02" – 8:35
3. "Fragment.03" – 8:25
4. "Fragment.04" – 9:29
5. "Fragment.05" – 5:37
6. "Fragment.06" – 9:08
7. "Fragment.07" – 4:14
8. "Fragment.08" – 3:30
9. "First Fragment" – 4:57
