= David Behrman =

American composer

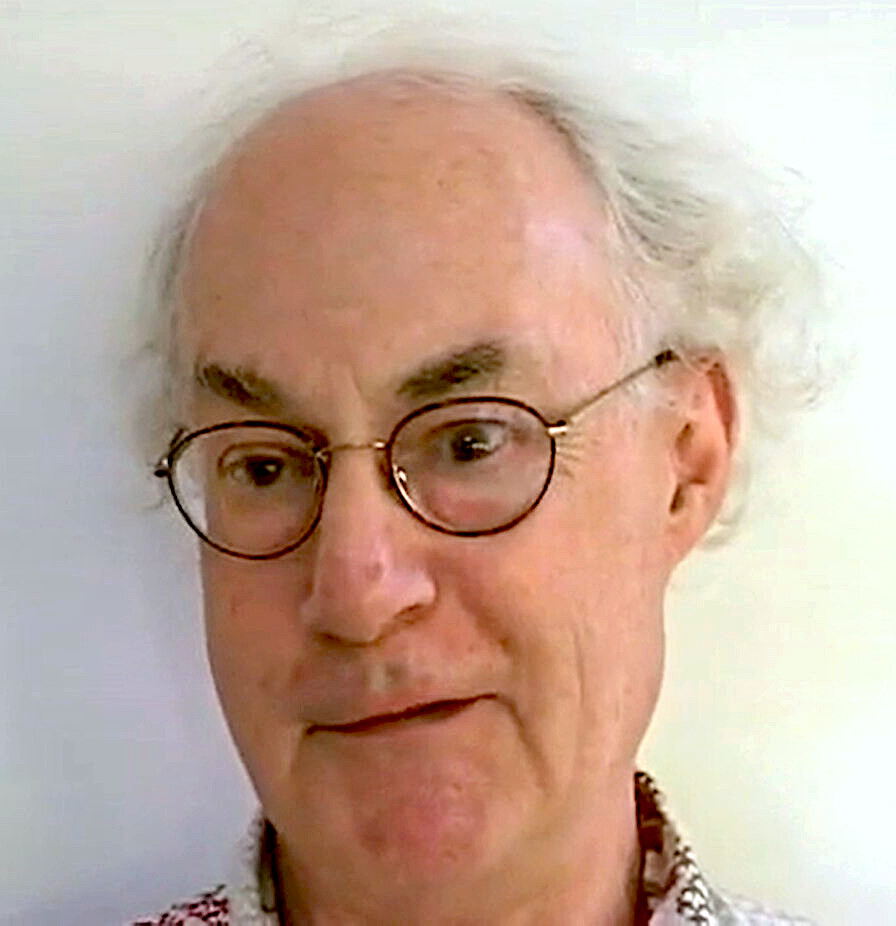
- Behrman circa 2003
- Born: August 16, 1937 (age 89); Salzburg, Austria
- Education: Phillips Academy; Harvard University (B.A.); Columbia University (M.A.)
- Occupations: Composer; producer; professor
- Years active: 1962–present
- Employers: Bard College, California Institute of the Arts, Mills College, Ohio State University, Rutgers University, Technische Universität Berlin
- Known for: Sonic Arts Union
- Notable work: On the Other Ocean
- Spouses: Shigeko Kubota (div. 1969) Terri Hanlon (m. 1979)
- Father: S. N. Behrman
- Relatives: Jascha Heifetz (uncle)

David Behrman (born August 16, 1937) is an American composer and a pioneer of computer music. In 1966, Behrman co-founded Sonic Arts Union with fellow composers Robert Ashley, Alvin Lucier and Gordon Mumma. He was also the producer of Columbia Records' late 1960s Music of Our Time series, which introduced recordings by Terry Riley, John Cage, Steve Reich, and Pauline Oliveros to a wider audience.

Behrman wrote the music for Merce Cunningham's dances Walkaround Time (1968), Rebus (1975), Pictures (1984) and Eyespace 40 (2007). In 1978, he released his debut album On the Other Ocean, a pioneering work combining computer music with live performance.

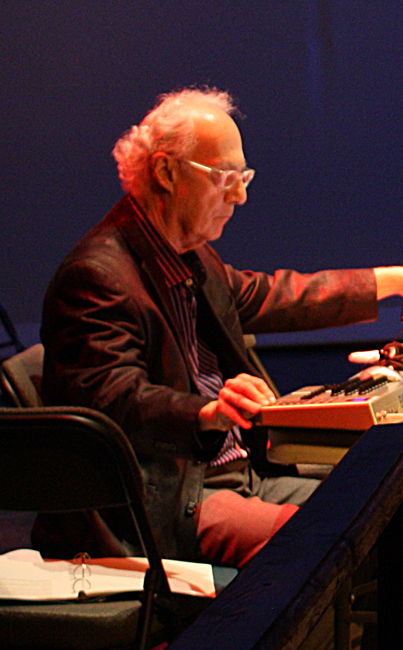
Behrman in 2012

== Biography ==
=== Early life and education ===
Behrman's father, S. N. Behrman, was a successful playwright and Hollywood screenplay writer. His mother Elza Heifetz Behrman was the sister of violinist Jascha Heifetz.

Behrman attended the Phillips Academy in Andover, Massachusetts, where his classmates included Carl Andre, Hollis Frampton and Frank Stella. There he also developed a lifelong friendship with composer and pianist Frederic Rzewski. While attending summer camp at Indian Hill in 1953 he was taught modern music by Wallingford Riegger. He received a BA from Harvard in 1959. At Harvard, he formed a lifelong friendship with Christian Wolff and where he continued his friendship with Frederic Rzewski. He attended the summer school at Darmstadt in 1959, where he met La Monte Young and Nam June Paik. He received a Master of Arts from Columbia University in 1963.

=== Teaching ===
He has been a member of the Avery Graduate Arts Program faculty at Bard College since 1998. He was co-director of the Center for Contemporary Music at Mills College in 1975–1980, and has taught also at the California Institute of the Arts, Ohio State University, Rutgers University, and Technische Universität Berlin.

== Music ==
Behrman began working as a tape editor for CBS's Columbia Records, and by 1967 he had been entrusted with curating and producing an album series entitled Music of Our Time highlighting contemporary American experimental music. The first release featured recordings by Steve Reich ("Come Out"), Pauline Oliveros, and Richard Maxfield. He later recorded Terry Riley's famous pieces In C (1968) and A Rainbow in Curved Air (1969), which would have the greatest impact of the albums released in the CBS series.

Behrman is known as a minimalist composer. His music has often involved interactions between live performers and computers, usually with the computer generating sounds triggered by some aspect of the live performance, usually certain pitches, but sometimes other aspects of the live sound, such as volume in QRSL (as recorded by Maggi Payne on The Extended Flute (CRI807). Many of his significant works, such as On the Other Ocean, Interspecies Small Talk, are based on a pitch sensing computer music system.

== Personal life ==
Behrman was briefly married to Japanese video artist, sculptor and avant-garde performance artist Shigeko Kubota. The marriage ended in 1969. He has been married since 1979 to media-artist Terri Hanlon.

Behrman lives in New York City.

== Awards ==
- 1994, Foundation for Contemporary Arts Grants to Artists Award.

== Discography ==
- On the Other Ocean Lovely Music Ltd. (1977)
- Leapday Night Lovely Music Ltd. (1987)
- Unforeseen Events XI Records (1991)
- Wave Train Alga Marghen (1998)
- My Dear Siegfried XI Records (2005)

== Films ==
- 1976 - Music With Roots in the Aether: Opera for Television. Tape 1: David Behrman. Produced and directed by Robert Ashley. New York, New York: Lovely Music.
- 2008 - Roulette TV: David Behrman. Roulette Intermedium Inc.
