= Steve Roden =

American sound artist (1964–2023)

- Steve Roden in 2007 performing at Beyond Baroque, Venice, California

Background information
- Born: April 27, 1964; Los Angeles, California, U.S.
- Origin: Pasadena, California, U.S.
- Died: September 6, 2023 (aged 59) Los Angeles, California, U.S.
- Genres: Lowercase; ambient; minimalism; Drone
- Occupations: Contemporary artist, record producer, sound artist, musician, visual artist, curator
- Instruments: Synthesizers, keyboards, sampler, contact microphone, computer, field recording
- Website: Official website

Steve Roden (April 27, 1964 – September 6, 2023) was an American contemporary artist and musician. He worked in the fields of sound and visual art, and is credited with pioneering lowercase music, a compositional style where quiet and usually unheard sounds are amplified to create complex and rich soundscapes. His discography of multiple albums and works of sound art includes Forms of Paper, which was commissioned by the Los Angeles Public Library.

== Biography ==
While he was a student at Beverly Hills High School from 1979 to 1982, Roden started a punk rock band called the Seditionaries, who performed with bands such as Circle Jerks, T.S.O.L. and The Damned. He received a Bachelor of Fine Arts from Otis Art Institute of Parsons School of Design (now Otis College of Art and Design) in 1986 and a Master of Fine Art from ArtCenter College of Design in 1989.

In 2013 Roden's work was featured in a two-person exhibition with Jenny Perlin at the Cleveland Institute of Art, and in a solo exhibition at Los Angeles Contemporary Exhibitions. In 2010, a mid-career survey of Roden's work was presented at the Armory Center for the Arts, Pasadena, California, curated by Howard Fox. Steve Roden was also a recipient of the 2011 Artist Grant of the Foundation for Contemporary Arts, and of a California Community Foundation Getty Fellowship Grant. His work has been featured in many exhibitions and museums around the world.

== Personal life and death ==
Roden married Sari Takahashi in 1993; the couple lived in the Park La Brea section of Los Angeles. Roden was diagnosed with Early-onset Alzheimer's disease in 2017, and died at his home on September 6, 2023, at the age of 59.

== Discography ==
This is an incomplete list.

- The Secret of Happiness (1990)
- So Delicate And Strangely Made (1993)
- Humming Endlessly in the Hush (1995)
- Translations & Articulations (1997)
- Crop Circles (1997)
- The House was Quiet and the World was Calm (1999) (with Brandon LaBelle)
- The Opening of the Field (1999) (with Brandon LaBelle)
- View (1999)
- The Radio (1999) (In Be Tween Noise)
- Four Possible Landscapes (2000)
- Forms of Paper (2001)
- Schindler House (2001)
- Japan (2001) (with Bernhard Günter)
- Winter Couplet (2002)
- Light Forms (2003)
- Speak No More About the Leaves (2003)
- Airforms (2005)
- stars of ice (2008)
- Flower & Water (2014)
- transmissions (voices of objects and skies) (2024)
