= Bernhard Günter =

German composer

Bernhard Günter (born 1957 in Neuwied, West Germany) is a German post-Cageian composer associated with microsound and lowercase movements or styles of minimalist composition. He is influenced by Morton Feldman.

A former rock and jazz drummer, Günter studied at IRCAM and began working with electronically generated sound. However, he now works primarily with samples. He founded his own label, Trente Oiseaux.

His first album Un Peu de Neige Salie (1993), a collection of pieces, was listed by The Wire as one of the 100 albums that "set the world on fire". He experimented with minimalist music in his album, "Details Agrandis".
