= Love of Life Orchestra =

American experimental music group

- Origin: New York, U.S.
- Genres: Experimental; disco
- Years active: 1977–present
- Labels: Lust/Unlust; Infidelity; DFA
- Members: Peter Gordon (sax, keyboards, composition); David Van Tieghem (Percussion)

Love of Life Orchestra (LOLO) is an experimental music group formed by Peter Gordon in New York City in April 1977. The band is associated with the 1970s New York downtown music scene.

A number of the players that would form the band came together in 1976, to perform Peter Gordon's Symphony in Four Movements at The Kitchen. Gordon was then asked to perform at a benefit concert for the New York non-profit Performing Artservices in Spring 1977, and so formed the Love of Life Orchestra with Arthur Russell, Peter Zummo, Jill Kroesen, "Blue" Gene Tyranny, David Van Tieghem, Scott Johnson, Ernie Brooks, Ed Friedman, and Kathy Acker. The group has had a widely varying lineup since, and other notable past members include Laurie Anderson, Rhys Chatham, and Ned Sublette.

In 2007, two tracks by the group — "Beginning of the Heartbreak" and "Don't Don't" — were prominently featured on the FabricLive.36 compilation curated by James Murphy and Pat Mahoney of LCD Soundsystem, generating a resurgence of interest in the band.

== Partial discography ==
- Star Jaws (Lovely Music) 1978, reissued on CD 2008
- Extended Niceties EP (Infidelity) 1980
- Geneva (Infidelity) 1980
- Casino EP (Expanded Music/Antarctica) 1982
- Love of Life (DFA Records) 2010, retrospective.
