= Geneva (Love of Life Orchestra album) =

Studio album by Love Of Life Orchestra
- Released: 1980
- Label: Infidelity (Lust/Unlust Music)

Geneva is a studio album by the Love of Life Orchestra. It was released in 1980 under the Infidelity (Lust/Unlust Music) label.

== Track listing ==
1. "Cry Like a Baby, Sing Like a Dog" 6:50
2. "Tight Ropes" 4:20
3. "Young Girls" 6:40
4. "Bugsy" 3:19
5. "Diamond Lane" 2:29
6. "Ordinary People" 2:45
7. "Lament" 6.45
8. "The Revolution Is Personal" 4:59
9. "Extra Dik" 3:30

== Personnel ==
- Peter Laurence Gordon - Keyboards, Saxophone, Producer, Performer, Musical Director
- Randy Gun - Guitar, Electronic Mandolin
- Larry Saltzman - Guitar
- Al Scotti - Bass (Electric)
- David Van Tieghem - Percussion, Drums, Producer, Musical Director
- Jean Ristori - Engineer
