= Mary Ashley =

American painter

Mary Ashley (1931 – June 15, 1996) was an important early video artist and performance artist, painter, and a founding member of the influential ONCE Group, together with her then-husband, the composer Robert Ashley. She was later active in the Correspondence Art scene, collaborating with Fluxus artists including Dick Higgins and George Brecht. She is credited with introducing the Ozalid process, an ammonia-based technique for the reproduction of industrial drawings, to the art world.

== Early life and education ==
Ashley was born Mary Tsaltas in Peabody, Massachusetts in 1931. She was the daughter of Greek immigrants. She went on to study visual art at the Massachusetts College of Art in Boston.

== The ONCE group and the Truck events ==
In February and March 1961, a group of composers and electronic musicians in Ann Arbor, Michigan, including Robert Ashley, George Cacioppo, Gordon Mumma, Roger Reynolds and Donald Scavarda, organized a series of concerts of contemporary music called the ONCE Festival of Musical Premiers. This first festival blossomed into an annual event that was held over the course of six years, and spawned a series of affiliated groups, festivals and workshops, including a theatrical ensemble called the ONCE Group. Mary Ashley was the driving force behind this group and she is credited with influencing the direction of the eponymous festival itself, which after 1963 changed from what was predominantly a festival of contemporary music to something more multi-disciplinary and theatrical, involving dance, theater, sculpture, public theater and what would later come to be known as performance art.

In May 1963, Ashley staged a street event in Ann Arbor called "Truck: Unscheduled Private Events in the Midst of an Unsuspecting Public Audience." In it, the audience exiting a local orchestral concert were confronted by a group of artists and performers led by Mary Ashley awaiting them in parked cars. In one was Ashley herself, sprawled across the seat and playing dead. In a van nearby a pianist was playing, while other performers, including Robert Ashley, Gordon and Jackie Mumma, and Caroline Cohen passed out sandwiches and engaged in other mundane, albeit incongruous activities. Although Ashley had obtained permission to stage the event, the ensuing chaos and traffic resulted in the arrival of the police. Ashley considered the event a huge success, and her "Truck" ensemble continued to perform annually, eventually performing some of the composer Robert Ashley's best known and most ambitious works of the 1960s, including That Morning Thing, The Trial of Anne Opie Wehrer, and Kittyhawk. Robert Ashley has described these "Truck events" as "wonderful art and invariably large-scale social disturbances."

Another performance typical of Ashley's pieces this period was a "sporting event" called "Walk." Staged in 1963 as part of a series of music and performances at the Red Door Gallery in Detroit, "Walk" involved an enormous ink pad, which audience members stepped into. They were then encouraged to mark up the walls of the gallery space using their feet — some participants balanced on each other's shoulders, held each other up horizontally or otherwise cooperated to create elaborate patterns, including two elaborate "maps," the outlines of which were created by picking up the ink pad and placing it against the wall. The approximately two-hour-long event's duration was fixed by a tape of Ashley's voice reading a long series of numbers recorded while on a two-hour-long walk in Ann Arbor.

A good example of the increasingly theatrical direction of the ONCE festival was 1965's ONCE AGAIN Festival. Held on the roof of a parking structure in Ann Arbor, there were film screenings, dance performances by six of the (former) Judson dancers, including Trisha Brown and Steve Paxton, as well as a premiere of John Cage’s "Talk I," a piece that involves the projection and modification of a conversation between the composer and friends. The opening concert, held on February 11, 1965, included a performance piece by Mary Ashley called "The Jelloman." The piece, "a study of narcissism" is best remembered for an unintentional wardrobe malfunction involving performer Robert Sheff (later renamed "Blue Gene" Tyranny), who remembers "I was on a table getting a massage from a guy dressed as an astronaut, the towel came off."

Ashley also produced some of the ONCE Festivals most memorable and scandalous posters, including one for its fourth iteration in the spring of 1964. It is a 10" x 16’’ sheet of paper, folded accordion-style into a 10" x 2" rectangle. unfolded, it shows a nude woman lying across the lunch counter of Ann Arbor's Red's Rite Spot, discreetly shielded in one place by a cake dish. Behind her are ONCE composers Mumma, Robert Ashley, Scavarda and Cacioppo, dressed in dark suits and looking like gangsters. The reverse side of the sheet of paper was printed with the program for the festival. According to Robert Ashley the poster was a "tribute to the Judson Dance Theater, which had recently restaged Manet’s Olympia to great critical dislike in The New York Times."

Between 1964 and 1968 Mary Ashley performed occasionally with what would become the Sonic Arts Union, a touring group comprising musicians and composers associated with the ONCE festivals. Its core members were composers Mumma, Robert Ashley, Alvin Lucier and later David Behrman but on some tours this group expanded to include works and performances by Mary Ashley, Mary Lucier, Barbara Lloyd and Shigeko Kubota. This expanded group traveled to, among other places, Europe. Mary Lucier remembers "the extraordinary energy" of one European tour that included all four women.

== Later years ==
Between 1968 and 1971, Mary Ashley performed in Dr. Chicago, a trilogy of darkly comedic experimental films directed by Ann Arbor Film Festival founder George Manupelli. In it, she plays the role of Sheila Marie, the girlfriend to the trilogy's title character, a quack "medical imposter" played by Alvin Lucier. Other performers in these films included such avant garde luminaries as Robert Ashley, Steve Paxton, Pauline Oliveros and Israeli mime Claude Kipnis.

Ashley is credited with introducing the Ozalid process, an ammonia-based technique for the reproduction of industrial drawings, to the contemporary art world in the late 1960s. One of the posters she created using this process was auctioned at a benefit for the Experiments in Art and Technology group cofounded by Billy Kluver, Robert Rauschenberg, Robert Whitman and Fred Waldhauer.

In the 1970s Ashley began working in the field of video art, and also did a series of stenciled and painted room-sized installations called "Oases," before turning her attention increasingly toward landscape paintings, particularly of the desert, which she loved. She taught at institutions including Virginia Commonwealth University, the California College of Arts and Crafts, and the Ontario College of Art in Toronto.

== Personal life ==
Ashley moved to the San Francisco Bay Area in 1969, where she remained for the rest of her life.

Ashley died of Alzheimer's disease in 1996, survived by Sam Ashley, her son with Robert Ashley, and Murray Korngold, her husband, a participant in LSD Research by Oscar Janiger.
