= Cacioppo =

Cacioppo is a surname of Italian origin. Notable people with the surname include:

- Aldo Cacioppo (1944–2026), Italian basketball player and coach
- Curt Cacioppo (born 1951), American composer of contemporary classical music and pianist of Italian descent
- George Cacioppo (1926–1984), American avant-garde composer
- Giovanni Cacioppo (born 1965), Italian comedian, cabaret artist and actor
- John T. Cacioppo (1951–2018), American social psychologist and cognitive neuroscientist of Italian descent

== See also ==
- Virginia Cacioppo, a victim of Italian serial killer Leonarda Cianciulli
- Renato Caccioppoli (1904–1959), Italian mathematician
