= Lovely Music =

Lovely Music (full name: Lovely Music Ltd.) is an American record label devoted to new American music. Based in New York City, the label was founded in 1978 by Mimi Johnson, an outgrowth of her nonprofit production company Performing Artservices Inc. It is one of the most important and longest running labels focusing exclusively on new music and has released over 100 recordings on LP, CD, and videocassette.

Composers represented on the label include Johnson's husband Robert Ashley (most of whose major works are in its catalog), as well as David Behrman, Alvin Lucier, Paul Dresher, William Duckworth, Jon Hassell, Joan La Barbara, David Tudor, Peter Gordon, and Meredith Monk, among others.

== Catalog ==
- 1001 (1978) Robert Ashley - Private Parts
- 1002 (1979) Robert Ashley - Automatic Writing
- 1003 (1990) Robert Ashley - Yellow Man With Heart With Wings
- 1004 (1994) Robert Ashley - eL/Aficianado
- 1005 (1998) Robert Ashley - Your Money My Life Goodbye
- 1006 (2000) Robert Ashley - Dust
- 1007 (2005) Robert Ashley - Celestial Excursions
- 1008 (2006) Robert Ashley - Foreign Experiences
- 1009 (2007) Robert Ashley - Now Eleanor's Idea
- 1010 (2008) Robert Ashley - Concrete
- 1011 (1980) Alvin Lucier - Music on a Long Thin Wire
- 1012 (1981) Alvin Lucier - Panorama
- 1013 (1981) Alvin Lucier - I Am Sitting In A Room
- 1014 (1982) Alvin Lucier - Music for Solo Performer
- 1015 (1983) Alvin Lucier - Still and Moving Lines of Silence in Families of Hyperbolas, 1-4
- 1016 (1985) Alvin Lucier - Still and Moving Lines of Silence in Families of Hyperbolas, 5-8
- 1017 (1988) Alvin Lucier - Sferics
- 1018 (1990) Alvin Lucier - Crossings (Three Works for Classical Instruments and Oscillators)
- 1019 (1994) Alvin Lucier - Clocker
- 1021 (1990) Jon Hassell - Vernal Equinox
- 1031 (1978) Peter Gordon - Star Jaws
- 1041 (1977) David Behrman - On the Other Ocean
- 1042 (1978) David Behrman - Leapday Night
- 1051 (1977) Meredith Monk - Key
- 1061 (1978) “Blue Gene Tyranny - “Out of the Blue”
- 1062 (1979) "Blue" Gene Tyranny - Just For The Record
- 1063 (1982) "Blue" Gene Tyranny - The Intermediary
- 1064 (1990) "Blue" Gene Tyranny - Free Delivery
- 1065 (1994) "Blue" Gene Tyranny - Country Boy Country Dog
- 1066 (2003) "Blue" Gene Tyranny - Take Your Time
- 1081 (1979) Tom Johnson - An Hour For Piano
- 1091 (1979) Gordon Mumma - Dresden / Venezia / Megaton
- 1092 (1986) Gordon Mumma with Pauline Oliveros and David Tudor - Mesa / Pontpoint / Fwyyn
- 1093 (2000) Gordon Mumma - Studio Retrospect
- 1601 (1984) David Tudor - Pulsers / Untitled (a.k.a. Three Works for Live Electronics)
- 1602 (1995) David Tudor - Neural Synthesis Nos. 6-9
- 1801 (1982) Roger Reynolds - Voicespace I, III and IV
- 1901 (1982) Pauline Oliveros - Accordion & Voice
- 1902 (1984) Pauline Oliveros - The Wanderer
- 1903 (1990) Pauline Oliveros - Crone Music
- 2001 (1983) Éliane Radigue - Songs of Milarepa
- 2003 (1987) Éliane Radigue - Jetsun Mila
- 2011 (1996) Paul Dresher - This Same Temple
- 2021 (1987) Roscoe Mitchell - Four Compositions
- 2022 (1993) Roscoe Mitchell - Pilgrimage
- 2031 (1983) William Duckworth - The Time Curve Preludes
- 2032 (1987) William Duckworth - Thirty-One Days
- 2033 (1994) William Duckworth - Southern Harmony
- 2053 (1998) John Cage - Music of Changes
- 2061 (1986) Maggi Payne - Crystal
- 2071 (1990) Takehisa Kosugi - Violin Improvisations
- 2081 (1989) Annea Lockwood - A Sound Map of the Hudson River
- 2082 (1999) Annea Lockwood - Breaking the Surface
- 2083 (2008) Annea Lockwood - A Sound Map of the Danube
- 2091 (1991) Fast Forward - Panhandling
- 3001 (1991) Joan La Barbara - Sound Paintings
- 3002 (1994) Joan La Barbara - 73 Poems
- 3003 (2003) Joan La Barbara - Voice Is the Original Instrument
- 3011 (1991) Paul DeMarinis - Music As A Second Language
- 3021 (1991) Thomas Buckner - Full Spectrum Voice
- 3022 (1994) Thomas Buckner - Sign of the Times
- 3023 (1998) Thomas Buckner - Inner Journey
- 3024 (2000) Thomas Buckner - His Tone of Voice
- 3031 (1992) Barbara Held - Upper Air Observation
- 3041 (1993) Yasunao Tone - Musica Iconologos
- 3051 (1994) Lois Svard - With and Without Memory
- 3052 (1997) Lois Svard - Other Places
- 3061 (1998) Leroy Jenkins - Solo
- 3071 (1995) David Rosenboom - Two Lines
- 3081 (2002) DownTown Ensemble - DownTown Only
- 3091 (2001) Chris Mann - and the use
- 3301 (1997) Robert Ashley - Atalanta (Acts of God)
- 3303 (1997) Robert Ashley - Atalanta (Acts of God) Vol.II
- 4001 (2004) Jacqueline Humbert - Chanteuse
- 4917 (1991) Robert Ashley - Perfect Lives
- 4921 (2002) Robert Ashley - In Sara, Mencken, Christ and Beethoven There Were Men and Women
- 5001 (2016) Robert Ashley - Crash
- 5002 (1992) Robert Ashley - Improvement (Don Leaves Linda)
- 5011 (1999) Alvin Lucier - Theme
- 5012 (2001) Alvin Lucier - Still Lives
- 5013 (2009) Alvin Lucier - Music for Solo Performer & Sferics

== See also ==
- List of record labels
