= Anne Wehrer =

American performance artist and writer (1929–2007)

Anne Opie Wehrer (née Counselman; 1929 – March 22, 2007) was an American performance artist, arts organizer, writer, and model. She was associated with the avant-garde art scene of the 1960s. Wehrer helped establish the ONCE Festival of New Music in Ann Arbor, Michigan, and performed internationally with the ONCE Group. Wehrer also appeared in Pop artist Andy Warhol's underground film Bike Boy (1967) and co-authored rock musician Iggy Pop's autobiography I Need More (1982).

== Early life and education ==
Anne Opie Counselman was born in 1929 in Norfolk, Virginia, to Richard Lee Counselman and his wife. Counselman graduated from Miss Turnbull's School in Norfolk in 1946. As a student, she performed in the play Production Problems, 1943 at the Woman's Club. In 1947, she was presented at the Bachelors' Cotillion in Baltimore and the Debutante Cotillion in New York.

In March 1948, Counselman underwent an amputation of her left leg in New York City after a foot condition developed into bone cancer. A report in The Virginian-Pilot disputed syndicated columnist Walter Winchell's account that she had been accidentally kicked by a football player at the Waldorf-Astoria's Winter Ball on December 29, 1947. Friends of Counselman in Norfolk denied the reported accident, and attributed the amputation to bone cancer. The condition had initially been thought to be osteomyelitis and had worsened while she was attending Maryland College for Women. She later attended Parsons College in Fairfield, Iowa.

In September 1949, Counselman announced her engagement to Joseph Wehrer of Swampscott, Massachusetts. A graduate of Stevens Institute of Technology, he had served as a Navy ensign during World War II and worked for General Electric in Boston. They married on November 5, 1949 at the Church of the Transfiguration in New York City, honeymooned in Florida, and settled in Lynn, Massachusetts.

== Career ==
Anne Wehrer worked as a John Robert Powers model in New York before appearing in the Raleigh Summer Theatre's 1954 production of The Philadelphia Story.

Wehrer played a key role in establishing the ONCE Festival of New Music, held in Ann Arbor, Michigan, from 1961 to 1966. The festival has been linked to the development of the Ann Arbor Blues and Jazz Festival and the Ann Arbor Film Festival. Despite having no formal training in an artistic discipline, Wehrer became a central organizer and performer, coordinating festival logistics such as accommodations and venue rentals. Wehrer served as secretary of the Dramatic Arts Center from 1961 to 1965.

Wehrer and her husband Joseph Wehrer performed with the ONCE Group, a collective of artists, architects, composers, and filmmakers that emerged from experimental theater activities at the Dramatic Arts Center. The group explored new approaches to music, dance, theater, and film in multidisciplinary performances. Active internationally during the 1960s, the ONCE Group toured the United States and performed at institutions including the Walker Art Center in Minneapolis and the Milwaukee Art Center in Milwaukee. It also participated in international festivals, including the Venice Biennale in 1964 and the São Paulo Art Biennial in 1965. In 1966, the group's touring ensemble presented ONCE-OFF, a program of four works, as a benefit for a planned European tour with performances scheduled in cities including Stockholm, Berlin, Vienna, and Paris.

Wehrer had connections to the Fluxus and the Factory scene in New York. She arranged for Pop artist Andy Warhol's Up-Tight multimedia event to be presented at the Ann Arbor Film Festival in March 1966. The two shows began with screenings of Warhol's underground films Vinyl and Lupe, followed by a live performance by the Velvet Underground. As the festival budget did not cover lodging, Warhol and his 11-person troupe all ended up staying either in her house or in the RV outside her house. The following year, Wehrer appeared in Warhol's film Bike Boy, credited as Ann Wehrer. She also contributed to Experiments in Art and Technology (E.A.T.).

In 1968, the ONCE Group presented its final work, Robert Ashley's experimental theater piece The Trial of Anne Opie Wehrer and Unknown Accomplices for Crimes Against Humanity. In the performance, Wehrer sat with her back to the audience and answered 100 questions prerecorded and played through loudspeakers. Two inquisitors cross-examined her responses, while two surrogates answered on their behalf. The questions ranged from invasively personal subjects to Wehrer's associations with well-known figures. The work was presented at venues across the United States in 1968 and 1969, including Colorado College, Grand Valley State College, and New York's Electric Circus.

In 1969, Wehrer and painter Mary Ashley published Decorate Your Own Ukrainian Easter Eggs, a coloring book introducing readers to the traditional Ukrainian and Slavic art of decorating Easter eggs. Originally conceived as an instructional book accompanied by tools and tracing paper, the project was simplified to a coloring book to keep costs affordable. It was published by Georgetown Publications and Miracol Press, Inc., in Ann Arbor, Michigan.

Wehrer coordinated contributions from the Midwest to the Museum of Modern Art's 1969 Machine Show and Expo '70 in Osaka, Japan.

After moving to New York City in 1972, Wehrer worked as a magazine writer. She later co-authored rock musician Iggy Pop's autobiography I Need More, published in 1982. She had known him since he was a teenager in Ann Arbor.

Known for connecting people and supporting emerging artists, she helped facilitate artistic projects and encouraged younger artists to develop their work.

== Personal life ==
At 18, she lost her left leg to bone cancer but adapted to using a prosthesis and maintained an active personal and professional life. Wehrer was married Joseph Wehrer, an architect and founding member of the ONCE group who was a professor of architecture at the University of Michigan. The couple had five children before divorcing. Her seven-bedroom home at 1502 Cambridge in Ann Arbor became a gathering place for artists, composers, and filmmakers.

Wehrer developed dementia in 1997. Her daughters provided care and companionship during her illness, and she remained physically mobile until the final week of her life.

== Death ==
Wehrer died on March 22, 2007, aged 77, following a brief stay at Coming Home Hospice in San Francisco, California.

She was survived by her five children, Martha Huddle, Thomas Wehrer, Paula Jean, Lisa Anderson, and Stephen Wehrer; five grandchildren; and her brother, Richard Counselman.

== Legacy ==
In 2014, Robert Ashley's opera The Trial of Anne Opie Wehrer and Unknown Accomplices for Crimes Against Humanity, featuring Wehrer in the title role, received its first New York staging at the Whitney Biennial. Written in 1968, the work had been proposed for the Whitney Museum of American Art by Wehrer in 1974, and was presented as one of three Ashley operas at the biennial.
