= Perfect Lives =

Opera by Robert Ashley

- Opera by Robert Ashley
- Still from Perfect Lives
- Librettist: Robert Ashley
- Language: English
- Premiere: 1983; Channel 4
- Website: Perfect Lives

Perfect Lives is a 1983 television opera in seven episodes (or acts) by American composer Robert Ashley, directed by John Sanborn. It was released on DVD in 2005, and a book of the libretto as well as an audio recording on cassette (1983) and CD (1991, reissued 2006, reissued 2020) in the U.S.

== Background and themes ==
Among many varying descriptions of the work, Ashley once described Perfect Lives as a "comic opera about reincarnation". Ashley's biographer, Kyle Gann, meanwhile, has stated that it can be called a "performance novel", "if opera raises too many expectations". Perfect Lives has been described as consisting of "digressions about the US landscape and American lives, performed in American vernacular language". It audiovisually makes use of self-references, non-sequiturs, an eclectic, pop-based but minimalist approach to its musical structure (sculpted by "Blue" Gene Tyranny and Peter Gordon), and surreal and intertwined visual editing (often making use of overlays and captions), as well as subjects like "Midwestern ennui", social conflict and metaphysics. The seven episodes often refer to events that are either about to happen or have happened, in an order depending more on the actions of other main characters than linear time. In its libretto, interjections and declared propositions are highlighted in small italic type.

The first and last episodes, "The Park" and "The Backyard", were originally presented on Ashley's 1978 album Private Parts, albeit in a more stripped down form and with accompanying tabla playing.

According to Ashley via Gann, its structure is based on the Bardo Thodol (the Tibetan Book of the Dead), although he intended to model it on Midwestern evangelism as well. The work's further extensions are Atalanta (Acts of God) and Now Eleanor's Idea (the opera followed by the tetralogy, the latter including Improvement, eL/Aficionado, Now Eleanor's Idea and Foreign Experiences), and they are also based on American religions.

== Roles ==
Main roles	Premiere cast
"R" (The Narrator)	Robert Ashley
Buddy (The World's Greatest Piano Player)	"Blue" Gene Tyranny
Isolde	Jil Kroesen
"D" (The Captain of The Football Team)	David Van Tieghem

== Synopsis ==
These are songs about the Corn Belt
and some of the people in it
... or on it.

=== Act 1: The Park (Privacy Rules) ===
11am

The narrator, "R", is set in place as being Ashley himself. Raoul de Noget, an over-the-hill lounge singer of unknown age, and his companion Buddy, nicknamed "The World's Greatest Piano Player", have arrived in a small town in the American Midwest. Raoul is sitting on a bed in his motel room, contemplating his new life. He makes himself a drink, plays with the telephone mindlessly, trying to call for breakfast, and mentally sets in place the "forwardness and backwardness" of life. He steps outside and makes his way to The Park, making two new friends: Isolde and her brother Donnie, nicknamed "The Captain of The Football Team". Together, they plan a plot that will work one way or another as a philosophical work of art: to rob a sizable amount of money from The Bank, go over the border with the money to Indiana, and return it the next day "to let the whole world know it was missing".

=== Act 2: The Supermarket (Famous People) ===
3pm

Helen and John, Isolde's parents and a couple from The Home who have visited "on a holiday", are in The Supermarket, after a commotion at The Bank. As they shop, "R" describes their relationship (which, "if they marry, one of them will lose the privileges"), their metaphysical relationship to The Supermarket, and among other things, Helen's decisions to do with buying a can of succotash. Ed and Gwyn, an eloping couple, have met.

=== Act 3: The Bank (Victimless Crime) ===
1:30pm

Raoul and Buddy (and his dogs), along with Isolde, have entered The Bank, ready to perform their plot. Gwyn is revealed as being a teller at the bank, and Donnie is also the assistant to the bank manager. A recurring song plays on the radio, and strange events happen in The Bank: Buddy's dogs have begun loudly arguing in Spanish (sounding "like a noise from Hades"), and annoyed at this, Isolde gives herself the excuse to get a bucket of water and splash it over the dogs, but misses and splashes the bank manager instead, who goes into the safe to change his clothes. However, with the three simultaneously trying to get the money, it turns out "the money is not there". As the eloping couple, Ed and Gwyn, drive off, these events repeat. This breaks away to a sequence where every teller at the bank is identified and introduced ("...works at the bank, that's her job, mostly she helps people count their money, she likes it"). All of these characters represent visions expressed in Ashley's later work, Now Eleanor's Idea.

=== Act 4: The Bar (Differences) ===
11pm

Buddy and Raoul arrive at The Bar, coming in contact with Rodney, who is The Bartender. A series of recaps occurs. His wife, Baby, enjoys Buddy's video tapes, named The Lessons, and wishes to flawlessly perform boogie-woogie music like he does. As Buddy's piano playing (which has been consistent throughout Perfect Lives) continues to become more dynamic in a series of Sermons, "R" discusses his ideas of The Seed, The Root and The Drone. Visually, this Act continuously references itself in the form of rewinding through the opera itself.

=== Act 5: The Living Room (The Solutions) ===
9pm

Will and Ida, a couple sitting in The Living Room, have sought out a way to figure out the overall motive of Raoul, Buddy and Isolde. Meanwhile, in Indiana, where Ed and Gwyn have driven (with the money hidden in the car), they meet with Donnie and his friend Dwayne, who have found a justice of the peace that will help enact Ed and Gwyn's wedding ceremony. Here, the narrative and language becomes more abstract than it has been before.

=== Act 6: The Church (After the Fact) ===
5pm

However, the JP is entranced by Gwyn's behavior, and mentally he is transported to other wedding ceremonies in the past, including one with a bride-to-be named Lucille who spoke in tongues, and eventually he remembers various famous marriages (including one between a celebrity named "Snowcrash") with time and place deeply confused, as the narration of "R" builds onto the act's passionate evangelical tone. The Church becomes "the church of the great light."

=== Act 7: The Backyard (T'Be Continued) ===
7pm

The setting moves back to town. It is summer, and friends and relatives have gathered in a picnic to watch and celebrate the changing of the light at sundown, through individually counted degrees. Isolde watches from the doorway of her mother's house and counts the days. Perfect Lives ends on a bittersweet note, as "R" himself seemingly states: "Dear George. What's going on? I'm not the same person I used to be."

== Legacy ==
Perfect Lives has frequently been lauded as one of Ashley's greatest works, has garnered a cult following, and musicians like Matmos, Varispeed, and Trystero have performed it in its entirety. Supposedly, John Cage once proclaimed "What about the Bible? And the Koran? It doesn't matter. We have Perfect Lives." Experimental artist Alex Waterman has spearheaded a new Spanish-language version of Perfect Lives entitled Vidas Perfectas, performing the piece around the world and producing a new video realization as well.
