= Van Tieghem =

Van Tieghem is a surname. Notable people with the surname include:

- David Van Tieghem (born 1955), American composer, musician, and sound designer
- Philippe Édouard Léon Van Tieghem (1839–1914), French botanist
