= Safety in Numbers (David Van Tieghem album) =

Studio album by David Van Tieghem
- Released: 1987
- Studios: Various: Battery Sound; Skyline Studios; Avic Studio
- Genres: Progressive electronic; techno-tribal; experimental
- Length: 46:14
- Label: Private Music
- Producers: David Van Tieghem; Roma Baran

David Van Tieghem chronology
These Things Happen (1984)	Safety in Numbers (1987)	Strange Cargo (1989)

Safety in Numbers is the second studio album by American progressive electronic composer and percussionist David Van Tieghem, released in 1987 by Private Music. Van Tieghem and Roma Baran produced the album. It was recorded at two separate recording studios in New York City, Battery Sound and Skyline Studios. Ryuichi Sakamoto of Yellow Magic Orchestra recorded his overdubs at Avic Studio in Tokyo. The sounds and sequences were digitally transferred to floppy disks and sent to Skyline Studio in New York, where they were realized onto multitrack tape by David Lebolt via Macintosh computer, MIDI interface and Mark of the Unicorn Performer software.

Tony Levin, the longtime bassist for progressive rock band King Crimson, plays Chapman Stick on the track "Night of the Cold Noses". Safety in Numbers' music has been described as a "downtown" mix of pop, new-age, percussion music and electronic music. The album makes extensive use of the Fairlight CMI digital sampling synthesizer.

After its original release, the album remained out-of-print on any format for many years. However, the album became available in 2017 via online MP3 download on Bandcamp.

== Critical reception ==
Professional ratings
Review scores
Source	Rating
AllMusic	3/5 stars

In a retrospective review for AllMusic, critic "Blue" Gene Tyranny (who also played piano on "Crystals" from the album) wrote, "not comfortably labeled New Age, or percussion music, or pop, or electronic music, Van Tieghem's music has that "downtown" mix of all these and yet is distinctly his own...from the lush "Crystals" to the droll and rhythm steady "Night of the Cold Noses." This is twisted "easy listening."

== Track listing ==
All tracks are written by David Van Tieghem.

Side one
No.	Title	Length
1.	"Galaxy"	5:06
2.	"Thunder Lizard"	5:00
3.	"Crystals"	5:04
4.	"Night of the Cold Noses"	5:10
5.	"Futures"	4:54

Side two
No.	Title	Length
6.	"All Safe"	5:49
7.	"Skeleton Key"	4:23
8.	"Clear"	4:31
9.	"Deep Sky"	2:43
10.	"A Wing and a Prayer"	3:34
Total length:		46:14

== Personnel ==
Credits are adapted from the Safety in Numbers liner notes.

Musicians

- David Van Tieghem – drums; percussion (metal ashtray; plastic milk bottle; Suzuki musical spring; scrap metal; Japanese stones; plastic mailing tube; aluminum soda cans; corrugated plastic hose; lamp parts; plastic sticks; bowed Chinese cymbal; Chinese gong; Roland Octapad); sampling (Fairlight CMI IIx and Series III; Akai S900); synthesizers (Yamaha DX7 and DX100; Korg Poly-800; Roland Juno-60; Voyetra-8); marimba; piano; clavinet; wooden tongue drum; ceramic drums; bells; jingle ball toy; raygun; processed radio and television signals; drum machine (E-mu SP-1200); voice
- Bill Buchen – African water drums; parabolic gamelan; wooden tongue drum (tracks 5, 9, 10)
- David Lebolt – synthesizers (Yamaha DX7; TX7; Voyetra Eight; memory Moog); sampling (Emulator II) (tracks 2, 6, 8)
- Ryuichi Sakamoto – synthesizer (Yamaha DX7); sampling (Emulator II; Fairlight CMI IIx) (tracks 2, 8)
- Robbie Kilgore – additional synthesizer programming
- Larry Saltzman – guitar (tracks 1, 2, 5, 8)
- Eric Liljestrand – guitar; EBow; programming assistance (tracks 3, 5)
- Laura Demme – voice (tracks 3, 9)
- Rebecca Armstrong – voice (tracks 6)
- Sara Cutler – harp (tracks 3, 7, 8)
- "Blue" Gene Tyranny – piano (track 3)
- Tony Levin – Chapman Stick (track 4)
- Ned Sublette – pedal steel guitar (track 4)
- Richard Landry – flute (track 4)
- Richard J. Van Tieghem – shortwave radio (tracks 1, 4)
- Tatsuhiko Mori – computers
- Clive Smith – programming assistance

Technical

- David Van Tieghem – producer
- Roma Baran – producer
- Leanne Ungar – engineer; mixing
- Eric Liljestrand – engineer
- Knut Bohn – assistant engineer
- Derek Davis – assistant engineer
- Barbara de Mauro – assistant engineer
- Bob Ludwig – mastering engineer

Artwork

- Jo Bonney – cover design
- Laura Demme – design
- Bill Buchen – design
- Deborah Feingold – portrait photo
- Paula Court – graphics photography
- Howard Sochurek – front cover color image processing
