= These Things Happen =

These Things Happen may refer to:

- These Things Happen (G-Eazy album)
- These Things Happen (David Van Tieghem album)
- "These Things Happen" (Casualty), a 1987 television episode
