= Composition No. 165 (for 18 instruments) =

Live album by Anthony Braxton
- Released: 1992
- Recorded: February 4, 1992
- Venue: Foellinger Great Hall of the Krannert Center for the Performing Arts, University of Illinois at Urbana–Champaign, IL
- Genre: Jazz
- Length: 50:05
- Label: New Albion; NA 050 CD

Anthony Braxton chronology
Duo (Amsterdam) 1991 (1991)	Composition No. 165 (for 18 instruments) (1992)	Two Lines (1992)

Composition No. 165 (for 18 instruments) is a live album by composer and conductor Anthony Braxton with the University of Illinois Creative Music Orchestra recorded in Illinois in 1992 and released on the New Albion label.

== Reception ==
Professional ratings
Review scores
Source	Rating
AllMusic	2/5 stars
The Penguin Guide to Jazz Recordings	3.5/4 stars

The AllMusic review by "Blue" Gene Tyranny called it "Wonderful acoustic music that winds its way through many textures and energy levels, not reducible to a simple description. Enjoyable, as well as music of a grand vision".

== Track listing ==
All compositions by Anthony Braxton.

1. "Composition No. 165 (for 18 instruments)" – 50:05

== Personnel ==
- University of Illinois Creative Music Orchestra, conducted by Anthony Braxton
  - Paul Martin Zonn – alto saxophone, clarinet, slide saxophone
  - Graham Kessler – alto saxophone, clarinet
  - Andrew Mitroff – tenor saxophone, flute
  - Kevin Engel – tenor saxophone, bassoon, clarinet
  - Mark Barone – baritone saxophone, bass clarinet
  - Thomas Tait, Jeff Helgesen, Judd G. Danby – trumpet
  - Erik Lund, Douglass Farwell, Keith Moore – trombone
  - Jesse Seifert-Gram – tuba
  - Tom Paynter – piano
  - Mark Zanter – guitar
  - Drew Krause – synthesizer
  - Adam Davis – bass
  - Justin Kramer, Tom Sherwood – percussion
