= Theatre X =

American theater company

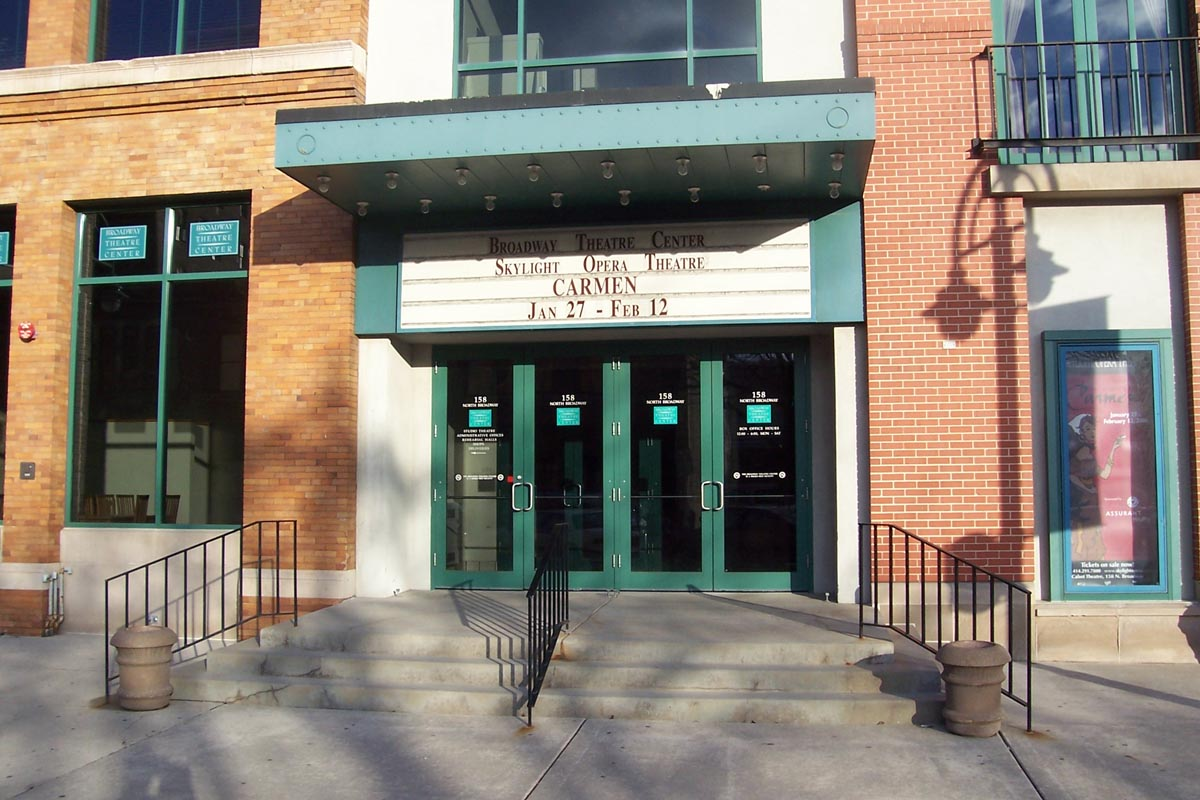
Broadway Theatre Center

Theatre X was an American theater company based in Milwaukee, Wisconsin. Until its demise in 2004, it was one of the oldest operating experimental theater ensembles in the U.S.

== History ==
The company formed in 1969 as an informal workshop by a group of UW–Milwaukee faculty and students. It became a professional company by 1971, touring throughout the United States and to Europe and Japan. It was named for the algebraic symbol x, which means an unknown quantity, thus implying a theater of unlimited possibility. The ensemble was a resident company at the Water Street Art Center in Milwaukee, where they rehearsed, performed and hosted traveling productions from other theater companies. The site soon included an art gallery and small press bookstore that years later became Woodland Pattern Book Center, as well as a grass roots outreach company, Friends Mime Theatre, which evolved into the Milwaukee Public Theatre. Finally, it moved into offices in the Broadway Theater Center in Milwaukee's Historic Third Ward and remained there until its collapse.

Much of its early work was created improvisationally as an ensemble, with influences including The Living Theatre and Jerzy Grotowski. The company created over 60 new plays among its 180 productions. In its last two years, Theatre X's board of directors gave then producing director David Ravel and artistic director John Schneider control over play selection and casting, which had previously involved the entire group, and then dissolved the acting company. This move away from an ensemble structure led to a public dispute when the board gave ensemble members John Kishline, Deborah Clifton and Marcie Hoffmann a forced leave of absence from acting in hopes of re-structuring the company, leaving only Schneider and Flora Coker as the remaining founding members. Though litigation was proposed, the lawsuit was dropped after it became too costly. Theatre X continued for 2 seasons but chose to turn off the lights in 2004.

Willem Dafoe was an early member of the ensemble and, when he stayed in New York to eventually join the Wooster Group, was replaced by Victor DeLorenzo, who later was one of the founders of Violent Femmes. Delorenzo was later replaced by David Rommel. John Sobczak, Cate Woodruff (then Pamela C. Woodruff) and Wesley Savick were also long-time members of Theatre X. Lory Lazarus, a member of Theatre X in the mid 1970s, went on to become a writer for Cartoon Network's "Courage, the Cowardly Dog" and a songwriter for "Barney & Friends" on PBS. Two of Theatre X's founding members, Conrad Bishop and Elizabeth Fuller, went on to form The Independent Eye.

Theatre X won a 1978 Obie Award for the set design and lighting design for the New York City production of their original play A Fierce Longing, based on the life of Yukio Mishima.
