= Curt Cacioppo =

American composer

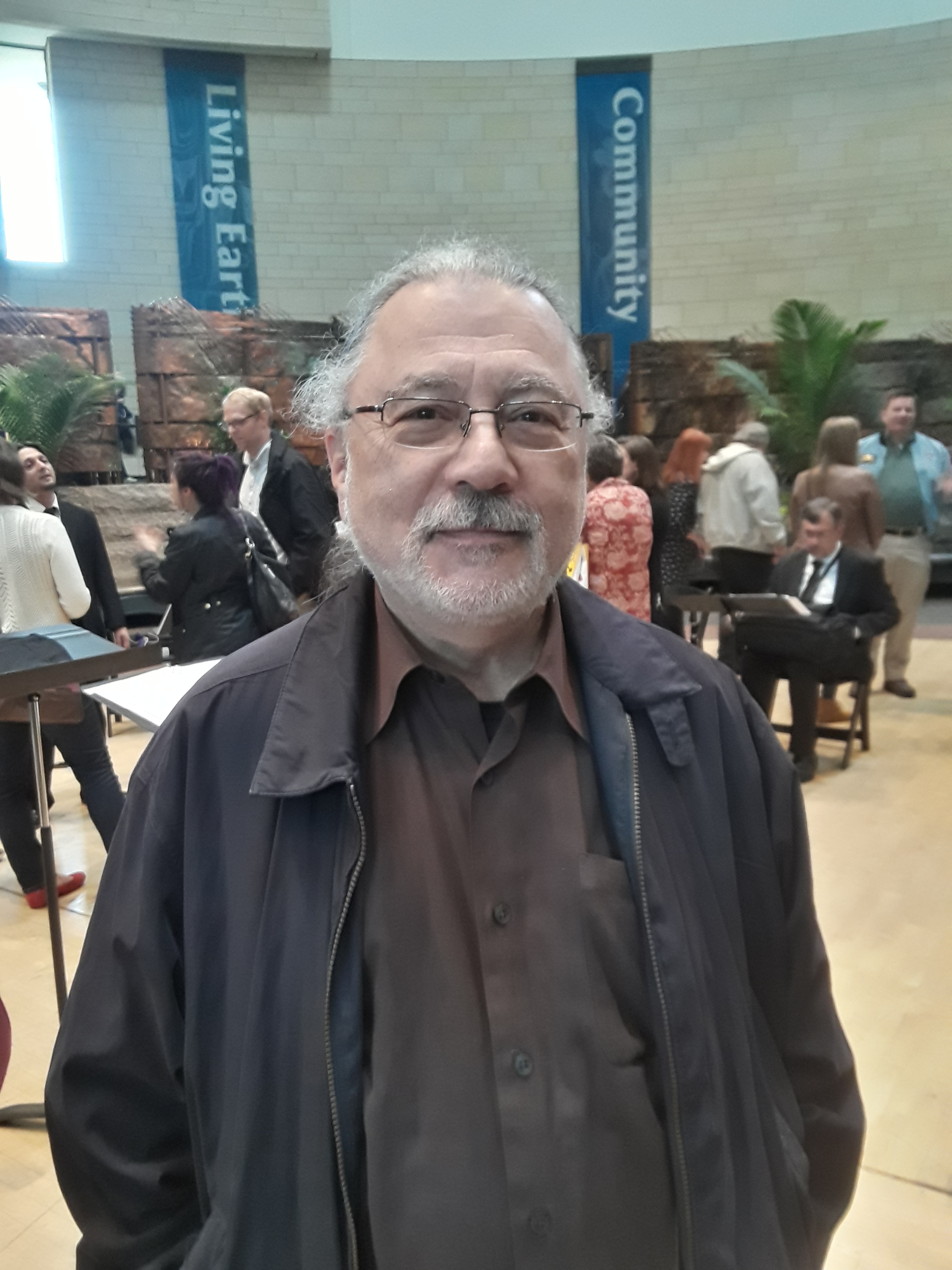
- Curt Cacioppo after a concert at the National Museum of the American Indian in 2019
- Born: 1951 (age 74–75)
- Era: Contemporary

Curtis Cacioppo (born 1951 in Ravenna, Ohio) is an American composer of contemporary classical music and pianist. He is of Sicilian ancestry on his father's side, and Anglo-Saxon ancestry on his mother's side. He is distantly related to the avant-garde composer George Cacioppo and the Dixieland trumpeter and bandleader Tony Almerico.

== Career ==
He received his bachelor's degree from Kent State University, where he majored in piano and studied composition. He earned an M.A. degree in musicology from New York University in 1976, studying with Gustave Reese as his advisor. His thesis dealt with the music of Trecento composer Johannes Ciconia. He studied at Harvard University with Leon Kirchner, Earl Kim, and Ivan Tcherepnin, earning M.A. (1979) and Ph.D. (1980) degrees in composition. He was also mentored by George Rochberg and ethnomusicologist David P. McAllester.

Cacioppo taught at Harvard University for four years, during which time he was also director of undergraduate studies in music. He joined the faculty of Haverford College in 1983, where he is Ruth Marshall Magill Professor of Music. His notable students include Peter McConnell, and Eric Sawyer.

His music is influenced by Native American music, and at Haverford he teaches a social justice course on Native American music and belief. He worked with Navajo elder John Co'ií Cook to preserve the music of the Coyoteway (Ma' ijií hatáál) healing ceremony, which is housed in the Special Collections at Haverford College. Cacioppo has written for many distinguished ensembles, including the Chicago Symphony and the Emerson String Quartet. He received a lifetime achievement award from the American Academy of Arts and Letters in 1997.

A concert pianist, Cacioppo studied with Ruth Laredo and Margaret Baxtresser, and performed in master classes for Arthur Loesser and John Browning. In chamber music he was tutored by Josef Gingold, John Mack and Tung Kwong Kwong, and appeared in concert with artists such as Arnold Steinhardt, Nicholas Kitchen and Geoffrey Michaels. Because of his strong connection with Italy, he collaborates frequently with the Quartetto di Venezia—their CD Ritornello drew a first-round Grammy nomination in 2014. As a proponent of new music, he has premiered works of George Rochberg (whose his Four Short Sonatas are dedicated to him), William Bolcom, and Marino Baratello, among many others in the U.S. and abroad.

== Selected discography ==
- Curt Cacioppo (Capstone, 1998)
- Burning With the Muse (MSR Classics, 2006)
- Ancestral Passage (2-CD set) (MSR Classics, 2008)
- Italia (Navona, 2010)
- Laws of the Pipe (Navona, 2012)
- Ritornello (Navona, 2014)

== Bibliography ==
- Cacioppo, Curt (1986). "Color and Dissonance in Late Beethoven: the String Quartet Op. 135". Journal of Musicological Research. 6 (3): 207–248. doi:10.1080/01411898608574566.
- — (1987). "Guns and Beethoven". Piano Quarterly. 36: 68–9.
- — (1990). "Poetry to Music: Schumann's Mondnacht Setting". College Music Symposium. 30: 46–56.
- — (1992). "Harmonic Behavior in The Rite of Spring". College Music Symposium. 32: 129–142.
- — (1993). "Survey of Piano Technic". In Palmieri, Robert (ed.). Encyclopedia of Keyboard Instruments, Volume I: The Piano. Garland. pp. 135–7.
- — (1993). "Fingering". In Palmieri, Robert (ed.). Encyclopedia of Keyboard Instruments, Volume I: The Piano. Garland. pp. 393–401.
- — (2010). "A Pianist in Dante's Hell: Marino Baratello's Malebolge cycle (published in Italian as "Un pianista nell' Inferno di Dante")". Acoustical Arts and Artifacts: Technology, Aesthetics, Communication. 7: 147–154.
