= ONCE Group =

American artist collective

- Origin: Ann Arbor, Michigan
- Years active: 1963–1969

ONCE Festival of New Music
- Genre: Electronic music, experimental music, etc.
- Location: Ann Arbor, Michigan
- Years active: 1961–1966
- Founders: Robert Ashley, George Cacioppo, Gordon Mumma, Roger Reynolds and Donald Scavarda

The ONCE Group was a collection of musicians, visual artists, architects, and film-makers who wished to create an environment in which artists could explore and share techniques and ideas in the 1960s. The group was responsible for hosting the ONCE Festival of New Music in Ann Arbor, Michigan, between 1961 and 1966. It was founded by Ann Arborites Robert Ashley, George Cacioppo, Gordon Mumma, Roger Reynolds and Donald Scavarda.

== History ==
ONCE.MORE
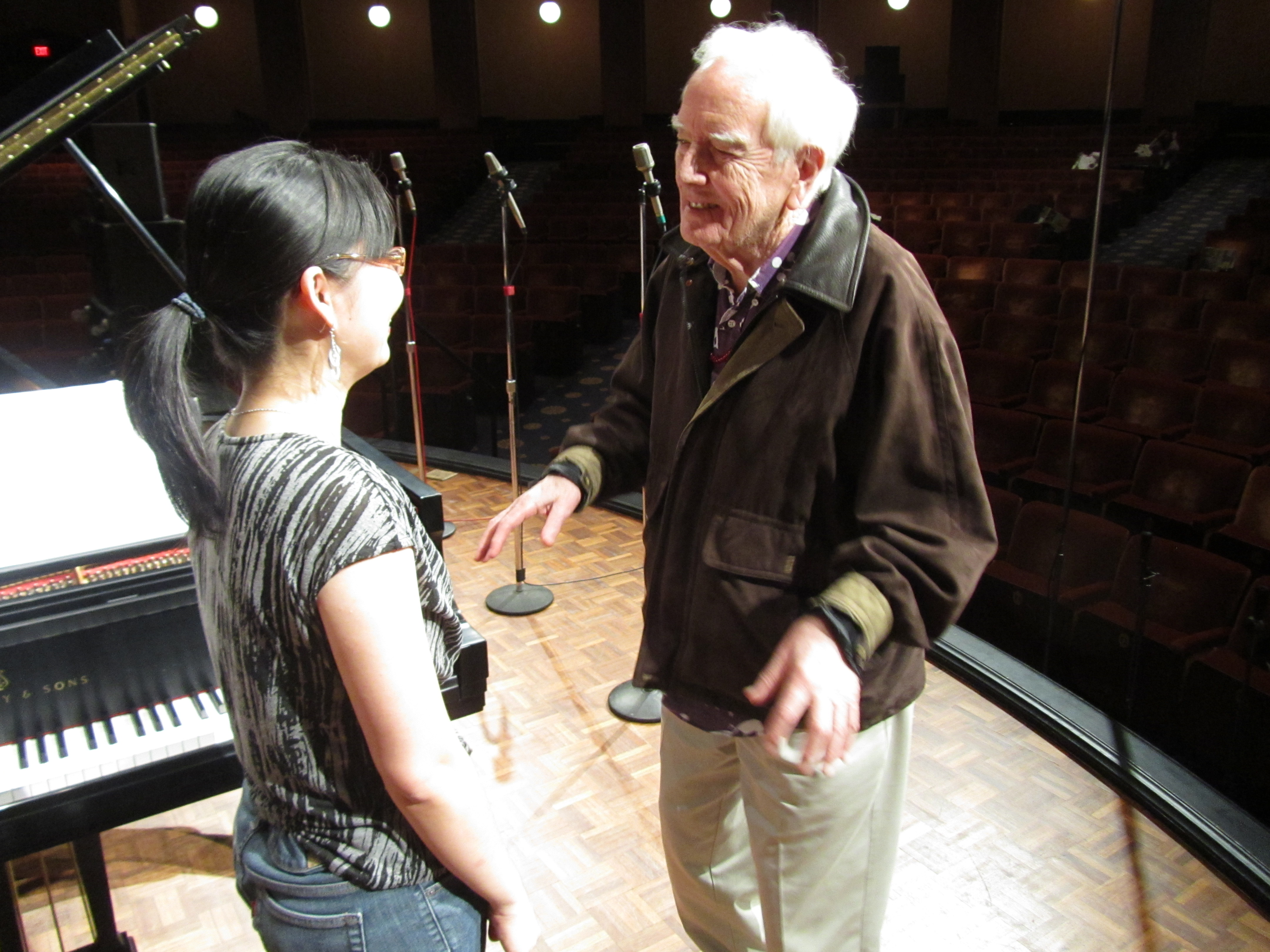
- Composer Robert Ashley at a rehearsal of his music at ONCE.MORE, Ann Arbor, Michigan, November 2010. Composer Robert Ashley at a rehearsal of his music at ONCE.MORE
- Dates: November 2010
- Location: Ann Arbor, Michigan
- Attendance: Robert Ashley, Gordon Mumma, Roger Reynolds and Donald Scavarda

The ONCE Group, a coalition of artists, architects, composers, and filmmakers that emerged from experimental theater activities at Ann Arbor's Dramatic Arts Center. The group explored new approaches to art and performance by combining music, dance, theater, and film in multimedia presentations.

Active in the 1960s, the ONCE Group toured extensively in the United States and internationally, performing at institutions including the Roosevelt University in Chicago, Case Institute in Cleveland, Antioch College in Yellow Springs, Walker Art Center in Minneapolis, and the Milwaukee Art Center in Wisconsin. The group participated in the 1964 Venice Biennale and the 1965 São Paulo Art Biennial, and performed at the first New York Theatre Rally in 1965. Its international engagements also included performances in Brazil and Venezuela.

In 1966, the ONCE Group presented ONCE-OFF, a program of four works at Ann Arbor High School Auditorium to raise funds for a European tour, with performances scheduled in Stockholm, Berlin, Warsaw, Vienna, Barcelona, and Paris.

In 1968, the ONCE Group premiered its final work, Ashley's The Trial of Anne Opie Wehrer and Unknown Accomplices for Crimes Against Humanity, featuring Anne Wehrer answering prerecorded questions while two inquisitors cross-examined her responses. The work premiered in April 1968 at the University of Wisconsin in Sheboygan, Wisconsin. The group presented it in various stagings across the United States in 1968 and 1969, including at Grand Valley State College in Allendale, Michigan; Colorado College in Colorado Springs, Colorado; Balboa Pavilion in Newport Beach, California; and the Electric Circus in New York City.

In November 2010, the University Musical Society and University of Michigan School of Music, Theatre & Dance collaborated to present a multi-day festival celebrating the 50th anniversary of the ONCE Group, entitled ONCE.MORE. ONCE.MORE was organized by Michael Daugherty, who was the chair of composition department of the University of Michigan School of Music, Theatre & Dance at the time and also a former composition student of Roger Reynolds at Yale during 1981.

== ONCE Festival of New Music ==
During the years the festival was active, a number of avant-garde composers’ works were performed along with performances in dance, jazz (Eric Dolphy) and rock and roll. Composers represented include: Robert Ashley, Pauline Oliveros, David Behrman, George Cacioppo, George Crevoshay, Donald Scavarda, Roger Reynolds, Gordon Mumma, Meredith Monk, Bruce Wise, Robert Sheff (a.k.a. 'Blue' Gene Tyranny), and Philip Krumm. The musical compositions and works in dance and avant-garde performance art pushed the limits of then current artistic endeavour and inclusiveness well beyond their limits. The festival served as a laboratory for the development of new approaches in both acoustic and electronic music as well as dance, film and multi-media performance.

== See also ==
- List of electronic music festivals
- Live electronic music
