= Hsiung-Zee Wong =

Chinese American composer (born 1947)

Hsiung-Zee Wong (born October 24, 1947) is a composer, artist, and designer who was born in Hong Kong.

== Biography ==
Wong moved to the United States in 1966, where she worked as a freelance graphic designer and illustrator. She studied at the University of Hawaii until 1968. In 1970, she studied electronic music at Mills College with Robert Sheff (later known as Gene Tyranny) and Dane Rudhyar. In 1972, she studied industrial design at the California College of Arts and Crafts. Other teachers included Ernst Krenek, Chou Wen-Chung, Leonard Klein and Robert Ashley. In 1972, Wong presented an art exhibit entitled "A Celebration of Women" at the Intersection Gallery (probably Intersection for the Arts).

Wong founded Hysteresis, a women's creative arts group that included Bay-area artists, at Mills College. She also performed with the Flowing Stream Ensemble. Wong's compositions include:

== Electronic ==
- Cry of Women in the Wilderness (piano, gong, and amplified Zen bell; 1972)
- Earth Rituals (tape with chanting and sound improvisation; 1973)
- Maturity (taped piano improvisation; 1972)
- Sounding of the Sane (tape with audience chanting)

== Guitar ==
- Artsongs and Ballads

== Multimedia ==
- They Move, Don't They? (sound calligraphic score with visual slides; 1973)

== Vocal ==
- Piano Ritual I (voice, piano, Chinese woodblock and gong)
- Songs (voice and guitar; 1964–1972)
