= Two Lines =

Live album by David Rosenboom / Anthony Braxton
- Released: 1995
- Recorded: October 3, 1992
- Venue: California Institute of the Arts Computer Music Studios, Santa Clarita, CA
- Genre: Jazz
- Length: 71:28
- Label: Lovely; LCD 3071

Anthony Braxton chronology
Composition No. 165 (for 18 instruments) (1992)	Two Lines (1995)	(Victoriaville) 1992 (1992)

Two Lines is an album by composer David Rosenboom with saxophonist and improviser Anthony Braxton recorded in 1992 and released on the Lovely label.

== Reception ==
The AllMusic review by Brian Olewnick stated "'It's a fairly dense, uncompromising effort but ultimately quite rewarding for its participants' devotion to Rosenboom's idea as well as for Braxton's inherent creativity in almost any situation. Recommended for fans of Braxton's more outside work".

== Track listing ==
All compositions by David Rosenboom and Anthony Braxton except where noted.

1. "Lineage" – 8:29
2. "Enactment" – 9:15
3. "Two Lines" (David Rosenboom) – 26:22
4. "Transfiguration" – 12:30
5. "Transference" – 14:52

== Personnel ==
- Anthony Braxton – sopranino saxophone, soprano saxophone, alto saxophone, clarinet, flute
- David Rosenboom – MIDI grand piano, Hierarchical Form Generator, responding sampled piano
