= Sonic Arts Union =

- Also known as: Sonic Arts Group
- Genres: Experimental
- Years active: 1966–1976
- Past members: Robert Ashley; David Behrman; Alvin Lucier; Gordon Mumma; Mary Ashley; Shigeko Kubota; Mary Lucier; Barbara Lloyd

The Sonic Arts Union was a collective of experimental musicians that was active between 1966 and 1976. The founding members of the group were Robert Ashley, David Behrman, Alvin Lucier and Gordon Mumma, all of whom had worked together in the instrumental performances of the ONCE festivals. They initially toured under the name Sonic Arts Group, until, at Ashley's suggestion, the name was changed to Sonic Arts Union.

Inspired by the success that John Cage and David Tudor had in touring and designing their own equipment, The Union toured Europe and the United States, though each contributor was performing his own work, either by himself or occasionally with help from other members where required. On some tours, the Union expanded to include Mary Ashley, Shigeko Kubota, Mary Lucier and Barbara Lloyd, who contributed their own works. The element uniting these individual works, according to David Behrman, was the desire to create pieces "in which established techniques were thrown away and the nature of sound was dealt with from scratch."
