= Mimi Johnson =

American arts administrator

Mimi Johnson is a New York City-based arts administrator.

Through her nonprofit organization Performing Artservices, Inc. (founded in 1972), Johnson assists, promotes, and presents artists working in the fields of contemporary music, theater, and dance. The agency was developed so that artists could obtain services they could not afford individually. Among the artists first managed by Performing Artservices were John Cage, David Tudor, Richard Foreman, Mabou Mines, The Sonic Arts Union (Robert Ashley, David Behrman, Alvin Lucier, and Gordon Mumma), The Viola Farber Dance Company, and the Philip Glass Ensemble. Among the services handled by the agency are business and fiscal management, fundraising, booking and contract negotiation, tour management, publicity and promotion, and local production.

Johnson is also the founder of Lovely Music, Ltd., a record label dedicated to the dissemination of new American music. The label is one of the most important and longest running labels focusing exclusively on new music and has released over 100 recordings on LP, CD, and videocassette.

Johnson was married to the late composer Robert Ashley.
