= Strange Cargo (David Van Tieghem album) =

Studio album by David Van Tieghem
- Released: 1989
- Genres: Progressive electronic; techno-tribal
- Length: 50:46
- Label: Private Music
- Producers: David Van Tieghem; Roma Baran; Paul Rice; François Kevorkian

David Van Tieghem chronology
| Safety in Numbers (1987) | Strange Cargo (1989) | Thrown for a Loop (2009) |

Professional ratings
Review scores
| Source | Rating |
|---|---|
| AllMusic | 4/5 stars |

Strange Cargo is the third studio album by American progressive electronic composer and percussionist David Van Tieghem, released in 1989 by Private Music.

Strange Cargo's music has been described as more diverse by mixing funk, jazz, Asian music and progressive electronic styles, producing structured melodies and weird sounds, with numerous background effects.

== Track listing ==
All music composed by David Van Tieghem except where noted.

1. "Strange Cargo" – 5:06
2. "Volcano Diving" (Dave Lebolt, Van Tieghem) – 4:34
3. "Hell or High Water" (Dave Lebolt, Van Tieghem) – 5:22
4. "Eye of the Beholder" – 2:16
5. "Flying Hearts" – 4:02
6. "They Drive by Night" – 8:14
7. "The Ghost Writer Theme" – 1:39
8. "Particle Ballet" – 6:00
9. "Yesterday Island" – 5:15
10. "Carnival of Souls" – 6:28
11. "She's Gone" – 1:40

== Personnel ==
- David Van Tieghem – vocals, multi-instruments, producer, engineer, mixing
- Roma Baran – arranger, producer
- Mark Egan – bass
- Eric Feinstein – finger snaps
- Scott Johnson – electric guitar
- François Kevorkian – producer, mixing
- Dave Lebolt – synthesizer, arranger, keyboards, producer, engineer
- Eric Liljestrand – electric guitar, engineer, finger snaps
- Kate McGarrigle – synthesizer
- Lenny Pickett – clarinet, bass clarinet, piccolo, alto and soprano saxophone
- Paul Rice – piano, producer, associate producer, mixing
- Larry Saltzman – electric guitar
