= The Independent Eye =

The Independent Eye was an American theatre company based in Sebastopol, California. The company ceased operations in 2020.

The group was founded in 1974 by Conrad Bishop and Elizabeth Fuller, who were then performing with Theatre X in Milwaukee and had helped to found that group. Bishop and Fuller moved to Chicago and began writing and producing their own work, performing sometimes as a duo and sometimes with a small core of collaborators. The group was later established as a regional theatre in Lancaster, Pennsylvania and Philadelphia, before moving to Sebastopol in 1999.

It toured throughout the United States and Europe and created numerous works for radio. Its public radio series Hitchhiking off the Map won a Silver Reel Award from the National Federation of Community Broadcasters.

In July 2020, the founders announced that the company was officially closing, citing both the COVID-19 pandemic and a desire to focus on archiving their creative work.
