= FabricLive.36 =

Compilation album by LCD Soundsystem
- Released: October 2007
- Genre: Electronic music
- Label: Fabric

LCD Soundsystem chronology
A Bunch of Stuff (2007)	FabricLive.36 (2007)	21 Soundtrack (2008)

FabricLive chronology
FabricLive.35 (2007)	FabricLive.36 (2007)	FabricLive.37 (2007)

FabricLive.36 is a DJ mix album by the electronic band LCD Soundsystem. It was released in 2007 as part of the FabricLive Mix Series.

== Track listing ==
1. Peter Gordon & Love of Life Orchestra - Beginning of the Heartbreak - Lust/Unlust
2. Baby Oliver - Primetime (Uptown Express) - Environ
3. Donald Byrd & 125th St, NYC - Love Has Come Around - Elektra
4. Instant Funk - I Got My Mind Made Up - Salsoul
5. Chic - I Feel Your Love Comin' On - Atlantic
6. Was (Not Was) - Tell Me That I'm Dreaming - ZE
7. GQ - Lies (Theo Parrish Ugly Edit #7) - GQ
8. Mudd - Adventures in Bickett Wood (Layne's Head Stash Re-roll)
9. Elektrik Dred - Butter Up (Gimme Some Bread) - Sounds of Florida
10. Lenny Williams - You Got Me Running - Geffen
11. Daniel Wang - Like Some Dream (I Can't Stop Dreaming) - Daniel Wang
12. Gichy Dan - Cowboys and Gangsters - ZE
13. Still Going - Still Going Theme - DFA
14. City of Women - Tablakone - Sähkö
15. Babytalk - Keep on Move - Stickydisc
16. Love Committee - Just as Long as I've Got You - Salsoul
17. Mouzon's Electric Band - Everybody Get Down - Mouzon
18. Punkin' Machine - I Need You Tonight - JC
19. LCD Soundsystem - Hippie Priest Bum-out - DFA/EMI
20. Junior Bryon - Dance to the Music (Dub) - Vanguard
21. JT - I Love Music - Vanguard
22. Jackson Jones - I Feel Good Put Your Pants On - Jackson Jones
23. NYC Peech Boys - Life Is Something Special - Island Def Jam
24. Peter Gordon & Love of Life Orchestra - Don't Don't - Lust/Unlust
