= Jill Kroesen =

Jill Kroesen was a performance artist and writer who was active in No Wave bands and avant-garde productions in the late-1970s and early-1980s in Downtown New York City. She has produced original musical theater works and written for many independent publications.

== Career ==
After studying with Robert Ashley and Terry Riley at Mills College, Kroesen moved to New York City. There, in 1976, she played with Rhys Chatham's group on his Seven Fairy Tales theater piece for 6 performers and reptile, before focusing on her own musical theater works and performance art works, presented in 1979 at Public Arts International/Free Speech. Other roles include Robert Ashley's early-1980s opera-for-TV project Perfect Lives, and her own recording for Lovely Music, Stop Vicious Cycles.

Kroesen's work in graphic and visual arts led to her receiving a video fellowship from the New York Foundation for the Arts in 1985, after which she continued her work as a video engineer.

== Discography ==
- Stop Vicious Cycles - Lovely Music Ltd. - 1982
