= George Cacioppo =

American composer

- Born: September 24, 1926; Monroe, MI
- Died: April 8, 1984 (aged 59); Ann Arbor, MI
- Occupation: composer

George Cacioppo (1926–1984) was an American avant-garde composer known as one of the founding members of the ONCE Group, which held the ONCE Festival in Ann Arbor, MI from 1961-1968.

== Biography ==
Cacioppo was born in Monroe, MI on September 24, 1926, and studied chemistry, then composition with Ross Lee Finney at the University of Michigan. He completed his bachelor’s degree in music in 1951 and a master’s degree in composition in 1952. Cacioppo worked at the Tanglewood Institute, where he was awarded the Serge Koussevitsky grant in 1959 to study with Leon Kirchner. He was a visiting lecturer in composition at the University of Michigan from 1961–68 and 1979–80, where he produced and hosted the “New Music” program on Michigan Public radio (WUOM/WVGR).

In 1961, Cacioppo co-founded, along with Robert Ashley, Gordon Mumma, Roger Reynolds, and Donald Scavarda, the ONCE group and was an active organizer of and participant in all of the ONCE Festivals, establishing Ann Arbor as an international center of experimental music in the 1960s.

Cacioppo was most known for experimenting with novel forms of notation as seen in works such as his piano work, Cassiopeia (1962), and the choral-orchestral piece, Advance of the Fungi (1964). Cassiopeia consists of constellation-like clusters of note-strands containing dots (labeled with pitch names) of different sizes (indicating dynamics) joined by intersecting and sometimes overlapping lines, making the score seem like a map. The performer moves from one dot to the next in any direction, the length of the connecting lines suggesting time lengths, showing his interest in indeterminacy and graphic notation.

His interests in the sciences, astronomy, mathematics, and poetry greatly impacted his musical output, and his later works dealt with pitch relationships and total-sound spectrums. Cacioppo's works are published by BMI Canada, Percussion Music Inc. (N.Y.), and Berandol Press (Toronto, Canada). He passed on April 8, 1984. The George Cacioppo papers are archived at the University of Michigan Bentley Historical Library.

== Selected works ==
- Fantasy for Violin and Piano (1950)
- Music for 2 Trumpets and Strings (1951)
- Piano Sonata: In Memoriam Béla Bartók (1951)
- Overture and Elegy for Orchestra (1952–53)
- String Trio (1960)
- Bestiary I: Eingang for Soprano, Piano, and 4 Percussionists (1961)
- 11 piano pieces for any number of pianos, with their realizations on tape sounding synchronously, or non-synchronously, and lasting any practical, or impractical, length of time, 2 of which are subtitled: No. 3, Cassiopeia (1962) and No. 11, Informed Sources (1970)
- 2 Worlds for Soprano and 7 Instruments (1962)
- Mod 3 for Flute, Double Bass, and Percussion (1963)
- Moved Upon Silence for 6 Percussionists (1963)
- The Advance of the Fungi for Textless Men’s Chorus, 3 Clarinets, 3 Trombones, 2 Horns, and Percussion (1964)
- Time on Time in Miracles for Soprano, 2 Horns, 2 Trombones, Cello, Piano, and Percussion (1964)
- Holy Ghost Vacuum, or America Faints for Electric Organ (1966)
- K for Live Electric Organs, Pianos, and Sound Modifiers (1967)
- K-2 for Live Electric Organs, Pianos, and Sound Modifiers (rev. 1968)
- Dream Concert for Organ, Voice, and Percussionist (1976)
