= Trade (gallery) =

Coordinates: 52°57′04″N 1°08′08″W

Trade is an artist run initiative based in Nottingham, UK that has been running since 2008. is curated by the artist Bruce Asbestos, and currently exhibits a program of painting shows, previously showing video work, sculpture and ceramics.

== About ==
Trade's gallery is part of at Primary, Nottingham, having been at One Thoresby Street since 2010.

Trade is dedicated to profiling the work of exceptional artists from a range of different career stages. The current programme is centered around succinct solo exhibitions of artists that include elements of painting within their main practice. Recent exhibitions include Urara Tsuchiya, Rae Hicks, Gordon Dalton and Daniel Sean Kelly. In the past Trade, especially at its One Thoresby Street location paid particular attention to performative, social, collaborative and collective artworks and historical artists' film and video.

The first event in 2008 a 'Parasitical Event' set the tone for this programme, the intention of the event was to create an additional form of discussion, engagement and criticism to complement existing activity in Nottingham. Trade has also embarked on a series of interviews with artists and has run programme of events and exhibitions at off-site locations including Broadway Cinema and M-e-x-i-c-o in Leeds.

Initially, in 2010 the gallery moved into a small 3m x 3m space and utilised other public spaces in the One Thoresby Street building for performative events and larger exhibitions. Trade moved downstairs a year later to a larger space and the focus of the programme turned to inviting groups and artists to participate in 'Short Sharp Blow to the Head', programme of short exhibitions and online takeovers. In 2013, Trade's redevelopment of One Thoresby Street's ground floor created four new gallery spaces. The exhibitions here were often complemented by live performances such as Robin Deacon's Approximating the Art of Stuart Sherman, Jaap Blonk's vocal improvisations and recently Lee Campbell's and Mel Jordan's 'Heckler' symposium. As of 2016, Trade moved to Primary, 33 Seely Road, Nottingham, NG7 1NU.

Trade is organised by artist Bruce Asbestos who was nominated for the Paul Hamlyn Foundation's Breakthrough Fund.

Trade was billed as 'One of the World's Best Secret Galleries' in the Independent, profiled in the Guardian and included in Kevin Hunt's HOT100.pdf of artist-run spaces.

== Exhibitions ==
2018: Joe Cheetham, Cara Nahaul, Matthew Macaulay

2017: Zoe Spowage, Adam Hedley

2016: Urara Tsuchiya, Rae Hicks, Gordon Dalton, Daniel Sean Kelly,

2014: Praise of Laziness, Secluded Bronte, Mimei Thompson, Ruth Beale, BANK

2013: Rachel Maclean: Quick Child, Run!, Pil and Galia Collective: Terminal Equilibrium, Mark McGowan: Where's Daddy's Pig?, Heckler, Jaap Blonk, Repeat All, Stuart Sherman: Spectacles (1975–89), How To Solve Problems In The Office

2012: Eyes On The Prize, One Night Stand, Pyramidd.biz, Lie - 6 Volumes, Tim Hattrick, Jackie Kerridge, Zachary Formwalt, This Is The Point, Kelly Large, Olivia Plender and Patrick Staff, Bubblebyte, Ewoud Van Rijn, Iva Kontic, Yelena Popova/Grandad Hill, Mexico, Retrogression, Karin Kihlberg and Reuben Henry

2011: Robert Ashley, Reactor, Karin Kihlberg and Reuben Henry, Elisa Pône, Katie Davies, Richard Paul, David Sherry Mark McGowan (performance artist)

2010: Joseph Beuys, Rotterdam VHS Festival, Mark Essen, Ben Woodson, Oliver Sutherland, Jemma Egan, Tomas Chaffe, Abigail Reynolds, Sarah Doyle, Phillip Henderson, Endless Supply, Artur Zmijewski,

2008: Parasitical Event (Stewart Home)

== Trade interviews ==
Trade has also interviewed: Leo Fitzmaurice, Helmut Wietz, Reactor, Tomas Chaffe, Richard Paul, Mirjam van Tilburg, Marjolijn Dijkman, Maarten Vanden Eynde, Juneau Projects, Simon and Tom Bloor, S Mark Gubb, Jack Strange, Ellie Harrison, James Ford, Elizabeth Rowe.
