= These Things Happen (David Van Tieghem album) =

Studio album by David Van Tieghem
- Released: 1984
- Studio: Battery Sound (New York); Right Track Recording (New York); Public Access Synthesizer Studio (New York); Rosewood Sound (New York)
- Genre: Progressive electronic; techno-tribal; experimental
- Length: 43:38
- Label: Warner Bros.
- Producer: David Van Tieghem

David Van Tieghem chronology
These Things Happen (1984)	Safety in Numbers (1987)

Singles from These Things Happen
- 1. "These Things Happen" Released: 1984

These Things Happen is the debut studio album by American progressive electronic composer and percussionist David Van Tieghem, released in 1984 by Warner Bros. Records. Van Tieghem produced the album himself, and it was recorded at four separate recording studios in New York City, which were Battery Sound, Right Track Recording, Public Access Synthesizer Studio and Rosewood Sound.

Although not his first musical work, it was his first proper album, notorious for Van Tieghem's use of percussion objects such as radio transmissions, a wine bottle, hair comb, metal ashtrays and balloons. It was commissioned for the dance "Fait Accompli", choreographed and directed by Twyla Tharp.

After its original release, the album remained out of print on any format for many years. However, the album became available in 2017 via online digital download on Bandcamp.

== Critical reception ==
Professional ratings
Review scores
Source	Rating
AllMusic	4.5/5 stars

In a retrospective review for AllMusic, critic William Ruhlmann wrote of the album, "Van Tieghem plays a wine bottle, a hair comb, metal ashtrays, and balloons, among other things. But this musically arranged junk heap is often amazingly musical."

== Track listing ==
All tracks are written by David Van Tieghem.

Side one
No.	Title	Length
1.	"Number One/Hunted Animals"	9:24
2.	"Men's Line/The Women"	4:25
3.	"Remote Viewing"	4:22
4.	"Beyond Knowledge and Power"	4:06

Side two
No.	Title	Length
5.	"Untitled/These Things Happen"	5:14
6.	"Boxing"	1:54
7.	"The Skyway/Scavengers/Two Worlds"	5:48
8.	"Dark Passage/Phantom Power/Fait Accompli"	9:05
Total length:		43:38

== Personnel ==
Credits are adapted from the These Things Happen liner notes.

Musicians

- David Van Tieghem – drums; percussion; electronic rhythm generators; digital and analog synthesizers; piano; marimba; cymbal; organ; synthesizer drums; vibraphone; saucepan; wine bottle; ceramic hand drums; cassettes; whistle; wooden tongue drum; tambourine; nipple gongs; hair comb; metal ashtrays; raygun; drafting stool; scrap metal; balloons; steel drums; voice; processor programming
- Peter Gordon – tenor saxophone; baritone saxophone; E-flat clarinet; synthesizer
- Rik Albani – trumpet; flugelhorn
- Rebecca Armstrong – voice
- Peter J. Gordon – French horn
- Eric Liljestrand – guitar
- Randy Gun – guitar
- Ron Robboy – cello; violin
- Richard Landry – alto saxophone
- Ned Sublette – pedal steel guitar
- Richard J. Van Tieghem – shortwave radio
- Leanne Ungar – processor programming
- Paul Shorr – processor programming

Technical

- David Van Tieghem – producer; additional engineering
- Leanne Ungar – engineer
- Paul Shorr – engineer
- Mark Freedman – additional engineering
- Peter Gordon – additional engineering
- Eric Liljestrand – assistant engineer
- Moira Marquis – assistant engineer
- Tim Crich – assistant engineer
- Tom Gartland – assistant engineer
- Bill Kipper – mastering engineer

Artwork

- Deborah Feingold – cover photograph
- Jo Bonney – cover design
