= Duo (Amsterdam) 1991 =

Live album by Anthony Braxton, Georg Gräwe
- Released: 1997
- Recorded: October 1991
- Venue: Cristofori, Amsterdam
- Genre: Jazz
- Length: 45:55
- Label: Okka Disk
- Producer: John Corbett

Anthony Braxton chronology
Willisau (Quartet) 1991 (1991)	Duo (Amsterdam) 1991 (1997)	Composition No. 165 (for 18 instruments) (1992)

Duo (Amsterdam) 1991 is an album by American jazz saxophonist Anthony Braxton and German pianist Georg Gräwe, which was released in 1997 on Okka Disk.

== Reception ==
Professional ratings
Review scores
Source	Rating
AllMusic	4/5 stars
The Penguin Guide to Jazz	3/4 stars

In his review for AllMusic, Brian Olewnick states "Grawe plays with great fluidity, often serving as a near mirror image (though decidedly flavored with his own musical nature) to Braxton's typically liquid and flowing flights of creativity."

The Penguin Guide to Jazz says "There are continual hints and reminders of Braxton’s current compositional interests, palindromic shapes and stretching pulses, which suggest the extent to which he used public performance of this sort as a laboratory for ideas which would take on a more detailed form later."

In an article for the Boston Phoenix Ed Hazell states "Like Braxton’s most satisfying keyboard partner, Marilyn Crispell, Georg Gräwe brings quick reflexes to the music and a style that mixes contemporary classical and free jazz vocabularies in a densely detailed, confrontational style that leaves Braxton no choice but to meet him head on."

== Track listing ==
All compositions by Braxton/Gräwe

1. "Duet I" – 25:12
2. "Duet II" – 16:00
3. "Duet III" – 4:43

== Personnel ==
- Anthony Braxton – soprano sax, clarinet, flute, alto sax
- Georg Gräwe – piano
