= John Schneider (stage actor) =

American actor and dramatist

John Schneider is an American actor, theatre director, playwright, and musician based in Milwaukee, Wisconsin. He is currently the Arts and Entertainment Editor for the Shepherd Express and a theatre arts professor at Marquette University.

== Career ==
He was one of the founding members of Theatre X, has appeared in hundreds of the group's productions since 1969, and was its artistic director and resident playwright until the group disbanded in 2004. His plays, produced by Theatre X and other companies around the world, include Acts of Kindness, An Interest in Strangers, and numerous literary adaptations.

Since 1988, Schneider has also performed as a cabaret singer, tap dancer, and leader of the John Schneider Orchestra, a touring jazz/swing group. He has also appeared on film, as a narrator in Wisconsin Death Trip.
