= (Victoriaville) 1992 =

Live album by Anthony Braxton Quartet
- Released: 1993
- Recorded: October 10, 1992
- Venue: Festival International de Musique Actuelle de Victoriaville, Quebec, Canada
- Genre: Jazz
- Length: 65:55
- Label: Victo; VICTO CD 021

Anthony Braxton chronology
Two Lines (1992)	(Victoriaville) 1992 (1993)	Wesleyan (12 Altosolos) 1992 (1992)

(Victoriaville) 1992 is a live album by composer and saxophonist Anthony Braxton recorded at the Festival International de Musique Actuelle de Victoriaville in Canada in 1992 and released on the Victo label.

== Reception ==
Professional ratings
Review scores
Source	Rating
AllMusic	2.5/5 stars
The Penguin Guide to Jazz Recordings	3/4 stars

The AllMusic review by Brian Olewnick stated:

Unlike many of the other documented recordings of this group, the material, with the exception of the closing track, consisted entirely of (at the time) recently composed pieces. Since much of Braxton's writing in the early '90s involved the exploration of very fluid and expansive sound territories, there are none of his infectious, bop-derived numbers or any plaintively emotional ballads. Instead we have a series of fairly knotty compositions where the thematic elements are elusive, recurring melodies rare and regular meter almost non-existent. All of which makes for one of the more challenging recordings by this quartet, requiring of the listener an approach perhaps more suited to contemporary classical music than to jazz.

== Track listing ==
All compositions by Anthony Braxton except where noted.

1. "Composition No 159+ (131+30+147)" – 10:41
2. "Composition No 148+ (108a+139+147)" – 20:32
3. "Composition No 161" – 12:53
4. "Composition No 158+ (108c+147)" – 15:04
5. "Impressions" (John Coltrane) – 6:45

== Personnel ==
- Anthony Braxton – alto saxophone, soprano saxophone, sopranino saxophone
- Marilyn Crispell – piano
- Mark Dresser – bass
- Gerry Hemingway – drums, percussion
