= Jacqueline Humbert =

American artist

Jacqueline Humbert is an American recording, performance and visual artist, as well as a designer for film, television and live performing arts. Under the name J. Jasmine, she recorded a song cycle, J Jasmine: My New Music (with collaborators David Rosenboom and George Manupelli) which dealt progressively with topics such as androgyny and female sexual agency. The cycle was presented at the Ann Arbor Film Festival in 1978. Her artistic persona on this release has been described as "a Linda Ronstadt for the avant garde". She would collaborate again with Rosenboom (and percussionist William Winant) in 1979–80 on the song cycle Daytime Viewing (released 1983), which uses the framework of soap operas to deal with themes of commercialism, family, fashion, and abuse.

She enjoyed a longstanding working relationship with the avant-garde opera composer Robert Ashley. She was married to composer David Rosenboom, and they were divorced in 2012.

== Biofeedback artworks ==
In the 1970s Humbert created several artworks based on biofeedback devices while in the research lab of David Rosenboom at York University, Canada: Alpha Garden (1973), Brainwave Etch-A-Sketch (1974) and Chilean Drought (Rosenboom & Humbert, 1974).

== Discography ==
- Robert Ashley - Atalanta Acts of God 2, Lovely Music, Ltd. CD, 2010
- Robert Ashley - Now Eleanor's Idea, Lovely Music, Ltd. CD, 2008
- Robert Ashley - Concrete, Lovely Music, Ltd. CD, 2008
- Future Travel (with David Rosenboom), New World, 2007
- Robert Ashley - Celestial Excursions, Lovely Music, Ltd. CD, 2005
- Robert Ashley - Foreign Experiences, Lovely Music, Ltd. CD, 2005
- Chanteuse, Lovely Music, Ltd. CD 4001, 2004
- Alvin Lucier, Music for Piano with Magnetic Strings, Lovely Music, Ltd. CD, 2000
- Robert Ashley - Dust, Lovely Music, Ltd. CD 1006, 2000
- Robert Ashley - Your Money My Life Goodbye, Lovely Music, Ltd. CD 1005, 1999
- Robert Ashley - Atalanta (Acts of God), Lovely Music, Ltd. CD 3301 (2 CDs), 1997
- Robert Ashley - eL/Aficionado, Lovely Music, Ltd. CD 1004, 1994
- Robert Ashley - Improvement (Don Leaves Linda), Elektra/Nonesuch 79289(2), 1992
- Robert Ashley - Atalanta Strategy, Lovely Music, Ltd. VHS, 1986
- Daytime Viewing (with David Rosenboom), Chez Hum-Boom Publishing, Frog Peak Music (cassette), 1983/88
- Music Word Fire And I Would Do It Again (Coo Coo): The Lessons, Lovely Music, Ltd. VHS, 1981
- J. Jasmine...My New Music, songs and lyrics by J. Humbert, Chez Hum-Boom Publishing and A.R.C. Records, and Frog Peak Music DR001, 1978
