= Cate Woodruff =

American artist

Cate Woodruff, born Pamela C. Woodruff, June 13, 1958, is an American artist, photographer, actor, director and writer, living and working in New York City and Sardinia, Italy. As a camera-based artist, working with homemade lenses, she is known for works that blur the boundaries of form and matter, revealing light, reflection and energy not usually perceived...

Woodruff's photographs have been exhibited at SL Gallery - New York; Galleria Comunale d’Arte, Castello di San Michele, Casa Falconieri - Cagliari, Sardinia, Italy; David & Schweitzer Contemporary - Brooklyn, NY; Sideshow Gallery - Brooklyn, NY; Soho Photo Gallery - NYC; Los Angeles Center for Digital Art; Fellini Gallery - Berlin; Mancaspazio Gallery - Nuoro, Sardinia, Italy; Soho20 Gallery - NYC; International Photography Festival Les Rencontres d’Arles 2012 - Arles, France; Muroff Kotler Visual Arts Gallery/SUNY Ulster - Stone Ridge, NY; Kleinert/James Arts Center - Woodstock, NY; KTD Monastery - Woodstock, NY.

Her artwork is in the permanent collections of the International Center of Photography, the Museum of Modern Art (MoMA), the Bartoli-Felter Foundation in Sardinia, Italy, and NYU Langone Health hospitals and medical centers

She attended the Institute for Advanced Theater Training at Harvard University, the London Academy of Music and Dramatic Art (LAMDA), and Webster University in St. Louis. She was a member of Theatre X in Milwaukee from 1984 to 1992
