= Milwaukee Public Theatre =

Theater troupe in Wisconsin (1974-2019)

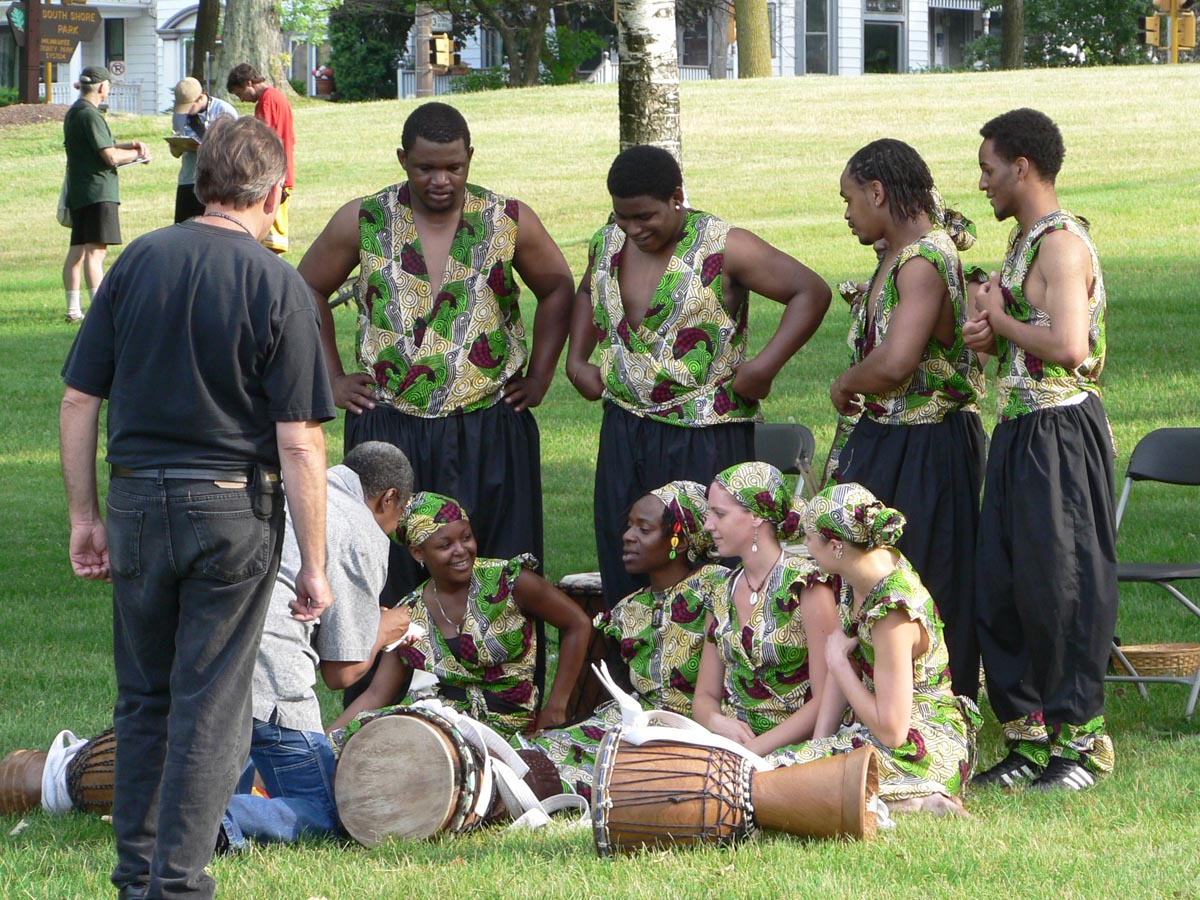
Ajula Performance Troupe

The Milwaukee Public Theatre was a theater company based in Milwaukee, Wisconsin active from 1974 to 2019.

== History ==
It was founded in 1974 as Friends Mime Theatre by Barbara Leigh and Michael John Moynihan, the theater created over 400 productions. The Public Theatre performed at over 400 events a year attended by 100,000 to 150,000 people.

In 2019, it became defunct after performing a potluck circus, "Passing the Torch".

== Past productions ==
- Most Dangerous Women - April 22–24, 2016
- Stories from the Medicine Wheel - March 20–27, 2015
- MPT Steampunk Circus of Metamorphosis - September 19, 2014
- From the Start Consider the Finish - October 18, 2011
- From the Start Consider the Finish - October 15, 2011
- From the Start Consider the Finish - October 14, 2011
- From the Start Consider the Finish - October 11, 2011
- From the Start Consider the Finish - October 9, 2011
- From the Start Consider the Finish - October 4, 2011
- From the Start Consider the Finish - September 24, 2011
- From the Start Consider the Finish - September 23, 2011
- From the Start Consider the Finish - September 11, 2011
- From the Start Consider the Finish - September 10, 2011
- One Man's Trash is Another Man's Treasure - May 7, 2010
- Camp We-Kan-Tak-It - October 8, 2009
- All-City People's Parade and Pageant - August 8, 2009
- Winter Voices - December 4–5, 2008
