= David Rosenboom =

American composer (born 1947)

David Rosenboom (born 1947 in Fairfield, Iowa) is a composer, performer, interdisciplinary artist, author, and educator known for his work in American experimental music.

Rosenboom has explored various forms of music, languages for improvisation, new techniques in scoring for ensembles, multi-disciplinary composition and performance, cross-cultural collaborations, performance art and literature, interactive multi-media, new instrument technologies, generative algorithmic systems, art-science research and philosophy, and extended musical interface with the human nervous system. He is a pioneer in the use of neurofeedback and compositional algorithms.

An active teacher, he was Faculty at The Herb Alpert School of Music at California Institute of the Arts from 1990 to 2023, and before that taught at other institutions such as Mills College, York University, and the Center for Creative and Performing Arts at the State University of New York in Buffalo. His students include Jin Hi Kim and Gino Robair.

As a young student, he studied (never finishing an undergraduate degree) composition, performance, and electronic music at the University of Illinois at Urbana-Champaign with Salvatore Martirano, Lejaren Hiller, Kenneth Gaburo, Gordon Binkerd, Bernard Goodman, Paul Rolland, Jack McKenzie, Soulima Stravinsky, John Garvey, and others. Working with Don Buchla, he was one of the first composers to use a digital synthesizer. He has performed at CalArts with Trichy Sankaran.

Rosenboom was married to performance artist and vocalist Jacqueline Humbert until 2012. He has three children from the union — Daniel, Dorothea, and Lindsay.

== Discography ==
- Suitable For Framing/ Is Art Is/ Patterns for London (A.R.C., 1975)
- Collaboration In Performance (1750 Arch, 1978)
- A Live Electro-acoustic Retrospective (Slowscan, 1987)
- Systems of Judgement (CRC, 1991)
- Two Lines (Lovely, 1996) with Anthony Braxton
- Brainwave Music (A.R.C., 1976 - EM, 2007)
- Future Travel (Street 002, 1981 - New World, 2007)
- How Much Better If Plymouth Rock Had Landed On The Pilgrims (New World, 2009)
- Life Field (Tzadik, 2012)
- Naked Curvature (Tzadik, 2015)
- Jacqueline Humbert And David Rosenboom: J.Jasmine: My New Music (Unseen Worlds, 2018)

=== As sideman ===
- With Anthony Braxton
- Five Compositions (Quartet) 1986 (Black Saint, 1986)

== See also ==
- Encephalophone

== Sources ==
- Zorn, John, ed. (2000). Arcana: Musicians on Music. New York: Granary Books/Hips Road. ISBN 1-887123-27-X.
- Liner notes, David Rosenboom's How Much Better if Plymouth Rock Had Landed on the Pilgrims. New World Records
- The Mike Douglas Show. "Brain Music for John and Yoko: John Lennon, Yoko Ono & Chuck Berry with David Rosenboom." 1972.
