= Mary Lucier =

American artist

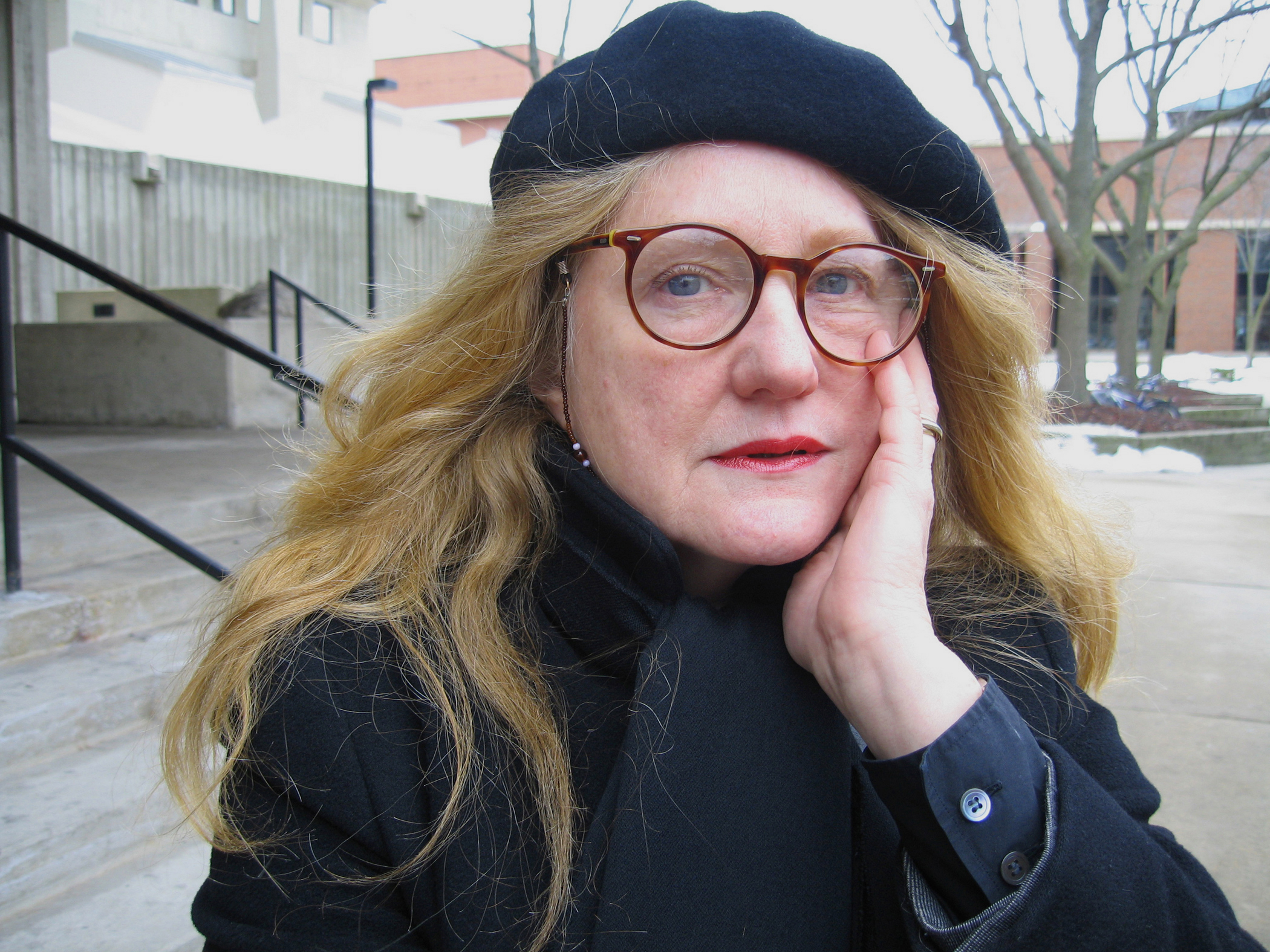
- Born: 1944 (age 81–82); Bucyrus, Ohio, U.S.
- Education: Brandeis University
- Known for: Installation and video art

Mary Lucier (born 1944, in Bucyrus, Ohio) is an American visual artist and pioneer in video art. Concentrating primarily on video and installation since 1973, she has produced numerous multiple- and single-channel pieces that have had a significant impact on the medium.

== Life and education ==
Lucier grew up in Bucyrus, Ohio, before receiving her B.A. from Brandeis University in literature and sculpture. She married the composer Alvin Lucier in 1964 and then toured with him as a member of the Sonic Arts Union from 1966 to the mid-1970s. She lived with him in Middletown, Connecticut after he secured a position at Wesleyan University until their divorce in ‘74, when she moved to New York City. She would later marry the painter Robert Berlind, who died in 2015. She currently lives in both New York City and Cochecton, New York, where she has established a studio and archive for video art.

== Work ==
Lucier was invested in performance and photography during her time in the Sonic Arts Union, creating works such as the Polaroid Image Series, which accompanied Alvin Lucier's work I am sitting in a room (1969). During this performance she projected slides transferred from Polaroids which were degraded in a process similar to Alvin Lucier's recorded voice.

Her movement into video in the early 1970s connected to her interest in the manipulation of the image as well as her fascination with the illuminated television box and its architectural space. In the 1970s, Lucier started to burn the internal recording tube of her camera by focusing on the sun which can be seen in her multi-channel video works Dawn Burn (1975), Paris Dawn Burn (1977) and Equinox (1979). She also performed a piece Fire Writing in 1975 at The Kitchen where she used laser beams to burn text onto the Vidicon tube of her hand-held camera, which can be seen in the resulting video image.

In the 1980s, Lucier moved into greater aesthetic and sculptural concerns with her work, reflecting a clear shift in video art sensibilities of the time period. Her 2-channel, 7-monitor installation Ohio at Giverny (1983) both removes the television box from view in its installation and provides a translation to video of Claude Monet’s technique of rendering light palpable. Wilderness (1986) furthered Lucier's experimentation with installation and landscape by placing three channels of video on seven monitors mounted on faux classical pedestals in a stepped colonnade and focusing on American landscape motifs.

In the 1990s, Lucier would investigate the more devastating aspects of the earth's landscapes by comparing the ecological precarity of the Brazilian Amazon and Alaskan wildlife with the cancerous human body in Noah’s Raven (1993) and examining the tragedy of flooding through recollections and ruined interiors in Floodsongs (1998).

Her work continued to investigate various aspects of the landscape and its diverse peoples into the 21st century including works such as The Plains of Sweet Regret (2004), a 5-channel video installation examining the Great Plains at a time of depopulation. In Drum Songs (2013) and (Untitled) Spirit Lake (2017) she examines Native American song and dance from the Cankdeska Cikana Singers and Drummers.

Lucier's art can be found in the collections of the Whitney Museum of American Art, the San Francisco Museum of Modern Art, the Museum of Modern Art in New York City, ZKM Museum für Neue Kunst in Karlsruhe, Germany, the Museo Nacional Centro de Arte Reina Sofia in Madrid, the Milwaukee Art Museum in Milwaukee, WI, the Columbus Museum of Art, Columbus, Ohio, the Albright-Knox Art Gallery, Buffalo, New York and the Munson-Williams Proctor Arts Institute, Utica, New York.

She is currently represented by Cristin Tierney Gallery.

== Teaching ==
Lucier has been an adjunct professor in Video Art at SUNY Purchase, a Visiting Regent's Professor in Art and Art History at UC Davis, a Visiting Lecturer in Video Art at Harvard University, and a visiting professor of Film and Video at the University of Wisconsin, Milwaukee. She has also taught at the Cleveland Institute of Art, at New York University, at the Minneapolis College of Art and Design, at the San Francisco Art Institute, and at the School of Visual Arts in New York.

== Grants and fellowships ==
Lucier has been the recipient of many awards and fellowships, including the National Endowment for the Arts, the John Simon Guggenheim Memorial Foundation in 1985, the Rockefeller Foundation in 2001, Creative Capital in 2001, Anonymous Was a Woman in 1998, the Nancy Graves Foundation in 2003, USA Artists in 2010, the American Film Institute Independent Filmmaker Grant, the Jerome Foundation in 1982, the New York State Council on the Arts, and the Japan-US Friendship Commission in 2010.

== Exhibitions ==
=== Select solo exhibitions ===
Mary Lucier has presented solo exhibitions at venues such as:

Catskill Art Space (2024)

The Phoenix Art Museum (2018)

The Kitchen (2016)

Tacoma Art Museum (2014–2015)

Amon Carter Museum (2008)

Huntington Museum of Art (2007)

North Dakota Museum of Art (2004)

Emerson Gallery at Hamilton College (2002)

Museum of Modern Art (1999)

San Francisco Museum of Modern Art (1995)

Toledo Museum of Art (1993)

City Gallery of Contemporary Art (1991)

Museum of Contemporary Art, Los Angeles (1988)

Dallas Museum of Art (1987)

Capp Street Project (1986)

Rose Art Museum (1986)

Carnegie Museum of Art (1983)

Hudson River Museum (1980)

City University Graduate Center (1979)

Everson Museum of Art (1976)

The Kitchen (1975)

=== Select group exhibitions ===
Lucier has participated in many international group exhibitions as well, such as:

Media Relay: An Exhibition in Two Parts presented by the National Academy of Design at PS122 (2022)

Partially Buried: Land-Based Art in Ohio, 1970 to Now at the Columbus Museum of Art (2021)

How Can We Think of Art At A Time Like This at Art At A Time Like This (2020)

Videotapes: Early Video Art (1965–1976) at Zachęta National Gallery of Art (2020)

Before Projection: Video Sculpture, 1974 – 1995 at MIT/List Visual Arts Center (2018) and at SculptureCenter (2018)

Citings/Sightings at Lennon, Weinburg, Inc. (2017)

Songs for Spirit Lake at the Rauschenberg Foundation Project Space, the North Dakota Museum of Art and the Cankdeska Cikana Community College (2013–2014)

Playing House at the Brooklyn Museum of Art (2012)

September 11 at MoMA PS1 (2011)

Two Monzeki Spaces at Takashimaya Exhibition Hall (2011)

Recasting Site at CCS Bard (2008)

Primera generacion. Arte e imagén en movimiento (1963–1986) at the Museo Reina Sofia (2006–2007)

Into the Light: The Projected Image in American Art, 1964–1977 at the Whitney Museum of American Art (2001–2002)

Illusions of Eden: Visions of the American Heartland at Museum of Modern Art/Ludwig Foundation, Ludwig Museum Budapest, Museum the Columbus Museum of Art and Madison Art Center (2000–2001)

Video Cult/ures at ZKM Museum für Neue Kunst (1999)

Landscape: Mediated Views at the Visual Studies Workshop (1998)

Living With Contemporary Art at the Aldrich Contemporary Art Museum (1995–1996)

Gazing Back: Shigeko Kubota and Mary Lucier at the Whitney Museum of American Art (1995)

Facing Eden: 100 Years of Landscape Art in the Bay Area at the De Young Museum (1994)

The First Generation: Women and Video, 1970–75 by Independent Curators International (1993)

Video Skulptur: retrospektiv und aktuell, 1963 – 1989 at the Kölnischer Kunstverein (1989)

Femmes Cathodiques at the Palais de tokyo, Musee d'art moderne de Paris (1989)

The Luminous Image at the Stedelijk Museum (1984)

Whitney Biennial 1983 at the Whitney Museum of American Art (1983)

The Second Link: Viewpoints on Video in the Eighties at the Walter Philips Gallery, travelled internationally (1983)

10e Biennale de Paris at the Musee d'art moderne de Paris (1977)

Sonic Arts Union performance at the Solomon R. Guggenheim Museum (1970)

== Selected Artworks ==
- Leaving Earth (2024) Nine-channel video and sound installation
- (Untitled) Spirit Lake (2017) Single-channel video/installation
- Drum Songs (2013) Three-channel video installation
- Wisconsin Arc (2012) Single-channel video installation
- Four Mandalas (2010) Four single-channel videos or four-channel installation
- The Plains of Sweet Regret (2004) Five-channel video installation
- Floodsongs (1998) Seven-channel video installation
- Summer, or Grief (1998) Single-channel video/installation
- House by the Water (1997) Four-channel video installation
- Last Rites (Positano) (1995) Eight-channel video installation
- Oblique House (Valdez) (1993) Six-channel video installation
- Noah's Raven (1993) Four-channel video installation
- MASS (1990) with Elizabeth Streb. 3-channel video installation
- Asylum (A Romance) (1986) Mixed Media installation
- Wilderness (1986) Three-channel video installation
- Amphibian (1985) with Elizabeth Streb. Performance with two-channels of video
- Ohio at Giverny (1983) Two-channel video installation
- Ohio to Giverny: Memory of Light (1983) Single-channel video
- Equinox (1979/2016) Seven-channel video installation
- Bird's Eye (1978) Single-channel video
- Paris Dawn Burn (1977) Seven-channel video installation
- Dawn Burn (1975) Seven-channel video installation with color slide projection
- Fire Writing (1975) Performance or single-channel video
- Air Writing (1974) Three-channel video
- Polaroid Image Series (1969–1974/2006) Black & white slides and videos with Alvin Lucier's I am sitting in a room
