= Peter Gordon (composer) =

American composer and musician (born 1951)

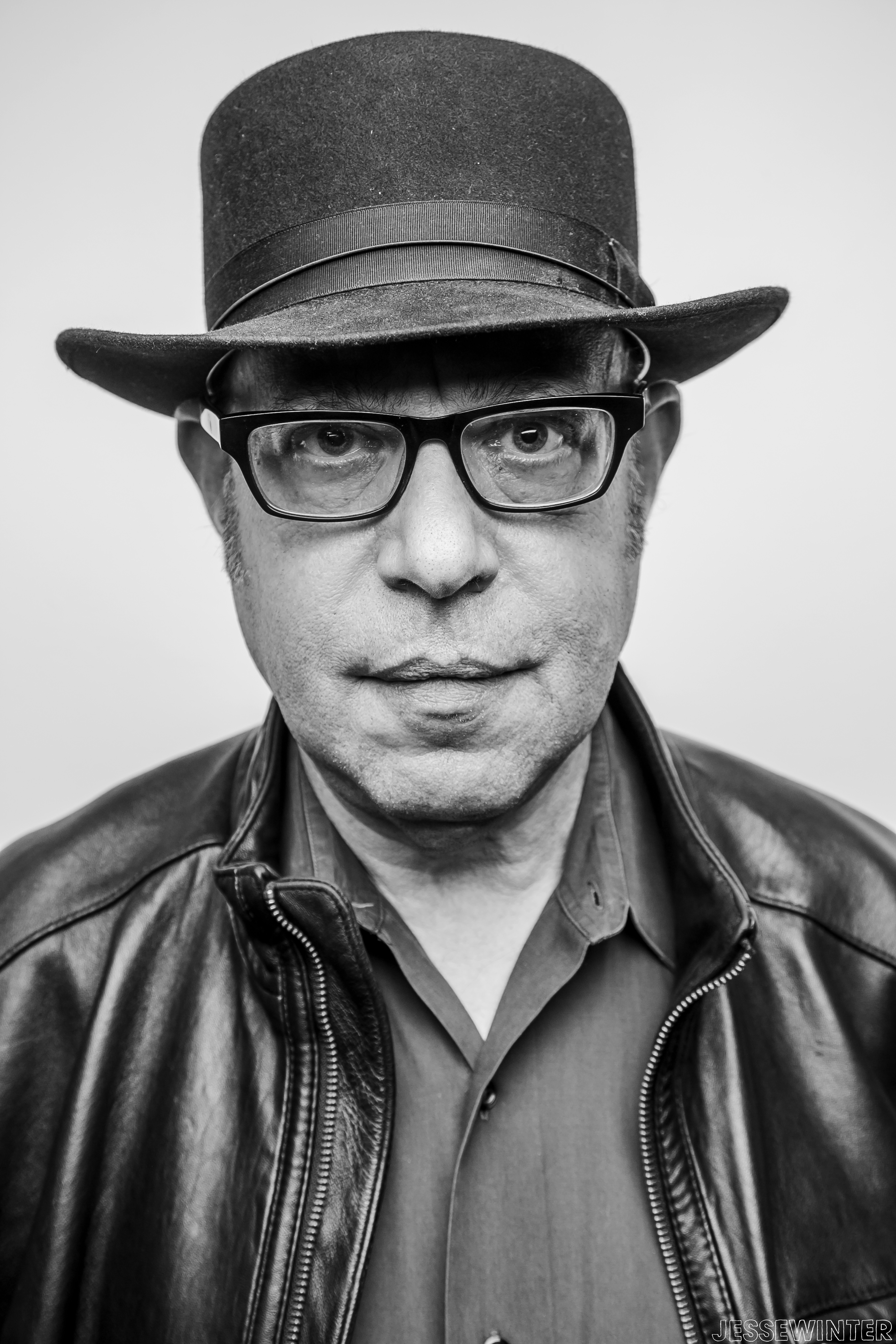
- Gordon in 2015

Background information
- Born: Peter Laurence Gordon; June 20, 1951 (age 75); New York City, US
- Occupations: Composer; producer; orchestrator
- Years active: 1970s–present
- Website: petergordon.com

Peter Laurence Gordon (born June 20, 1951) is an American saxophonist, clarinetist, pianist and experimental composer, whose influences include jazz, disco, funk, rock, opera, classical and world music. He has released several albums and composed scores for film and theater, and he has also toured and re-interpreted the music of Arthur Russell, on whose compositions he played, as well as that of Robert Ashley.

== Early life and education ==
Gordon was born in New York City, and grew up in Virginia, Munich, and Los Angeles. He began piano lessons at age 7 and learned the clarinet in early childhood. He started to play the saxophone, which would become his main instrument, at age 14. His earliest musical influences were jazz artists from New Orleans, as well as The Shadows, The Ventures, Albert Ayler, Igor Stravinsky, Sun Ra, The Animals and The Yardbirds.

When he was a senior in high school, Gordon made friends with Captain Beefheart and spent time at Beefheart's home studio while he was recording Trout Mask Replica. He told the critic Geeta Dayal, “...it was really through Beefheart that introduced me to the idea that rock music and pop music could be art simultaneously, and you didn't have to buy into the whole commercial record business. You could make really raw, funky music and have it be really smart at the same time.”

He has said of the development of his style, “....once I started playing sax, I was trained more as a jazz musician than as a classical player. I did study classical music and composition in college, though from more of an experimental music perspective than a conservatory approach.” About jazz, though, he told the composer Nick Hallett, “I never really got into that play-the-head-take-turns-soloing-play-the-head-again type of jazz, that dependency on standard repertoire. Also there was something about the jazz players—it was almost athletic in a certain sense. It was always like, who plays the fastest solo? Who's the hottest player? There was this sort of hierarchy, guys who knew all those be-bop solos and played really fast, and a lot of it seemed more about chops than about music. And I began being more interested in exploring a limited set of either musical skills or gestures, and really trying to look at things singularly from different points of view. Also, whatever you do in the jazz hierarchy, you're always competing against Charlie Parker and John Coltrane.”

Gordon earned a BA in composition at University of California, San Diego, where he studied with Kenneth Gaburo and Roger Reynolds; he earned an MFA at the Mills College Center for Contemporary Music, where he studied with Robert Ashley and Terry Riley. Discussing his time in California, Gordon told The Irish Times, “Initially, I had a very austere, modern, avant-garde classical schooling in San Diego and I rebelled against that….I always had a mission to create music which integrated the head and the body.”

== Career ==
Gordon has led a varied career: He has helmed his ensemble the Love of Life Orchestra, collaborated with other composers, and composed works for stage shows, particularly at Brooklyn Academy of Music. About his saxophone playing, Gordon has said, “I always liked the deep-throated R&B sound. Gene Ammons, Plas Johnson, King Curtis, Though if I had to name a sax hero, that would be John Coltrane.” As a composer, he was heavily influenced by his teacher Terry Riley.

Gordon co-founded The Love of Life Orchestra with David Van Tieghem in the late 1970s. At various points Arthur Russell, Rhys Chatham, Kathy Acker, Ernie Brooks, Jill Kroesen and Peter Zummo were collaborators in Love of Life Orchestra.

Gordon was an early proponent of Tape Music, which according to musicologist and composer Ned Sublette, “created an original kind of continuum between the composed and improvised, and between the acoustic and the virtual, one that gave performers a broad scope to create their own sound and their own parts while hewing to a carefully thought-out composition…”

He collaborated with “Blue” Gene Tyranny a number of times, including for the Trust In Rock recordings, performed live at the University Art Museum in Berkeley in 1976, and released as a recording on Unseen Worlds in 2019. He collaborated with writer Kathy Acker, artist David Salle and director Richard Foreman on the opera The Birth Of The Poet, which opened in Rotterdam in 1984, and had its U.S. premiere at Brooklyn Academy of Music in 1985. His score for Otello, a collaboration with the Neapolitan theater company Falso Movimiento, won the Village Voice's Obie Award in 1985. That same year, Gordon composed the score for Secret Pastures, a collaboration with choreographers Bill T. Jones and Arnie Zane, artist Keith Haring, and designer Willi Smith, which premiered at BAM in 1984. His work on that production, as well as Otello, earned him a 1985 Bessie award in the category of Composer.

His composition Return of the Native, a collaboration with video artist Kit Fitzgerald, his wife and frequent creative partner, premiered at BAM in 1988. According to Sublette, it was “the first fusion of live orchestra and live video projection.” In fact, Gordon and Fitzgerald had merged projection and orchestration on earlier productions outside of New York City, including Return of the Animals, a 1984 performance at Rivoli Castle in Turin.

In 2015, Gordon directed a touring revival of Arthur Russell's Instrumentals, whose first showing he scored in 1975.

In addition to his own work, and that with his Love of Life Orchestra, he has appeared on or composed music for albums by Laurie Anderson, Suzanne Vega, David Johansen, Elliott Murphy, Loose Joints, Dinosaur L, Gabe Gurnsey, Museum of Love, “Blue” Gene Tyranny, The Flying Lizards, David Van Tieghem, Lawrence Weiner, and Arthur Russell.

Gordon has collaborated on a number of occasions with Willi Smith's company Williwear, including the film Expedition, used to introduce the designer's 1986 collection, which was directed by Max Vadukul and shot on location in Dakar.

In 2007, James Murphy and Pat Mahoney of LCD Soundsystem used Gordon's classic Downtown tracks "Beginning of the Heartbreak" and "Don't Don't" to open and close their highly acclaimed dance mix FabricLive.36.

In 2008 an excerpt of his opera (with artist Lawrence Weiner) The Society Architect Ponders the Golden Gate Bridge was issued on the compilation album Crosstalk: American Speech Music (Bridge Records) produced by Mendi + Keith Obadike. Gordon wrote the scores for the serial mystery drama The Necklace, presented by The Talking Band. He worked on the soundtrack to Desperate Housewives.

In 2010, DFA Records released remixes by Gordon of "Beginning of the Heartbreak/Don't Don't" and "That Hat," cowritten with Arthur Russell. They released a compilation, Peter Gordon & Love Of Life Orchestra, consisting of music Gordon and his ensemble recorded in the ‘70s and ‘80s, that same year.

== Personal life ==
Gordon was involved romantically with Kathy Acker, whom he lived with for six years. He resides in New York City. His wife of 39 years and collaborator, the video artist Kit Fitzgerald, passed away on Aug. 3, 2026.

== Discography ==
=== Solo albums ===
- Star Jaws LP (Lovely Music, 1978)
- Deutsche Angst, with Lawrence Weiner (Les Disques du Crépuscule, 1982)
- Secret Pastures (Artservices, 1984)
- Innocent LP (CBS Masterworks, 1986)
- Otello (ROIR, cassette 1987)
- Brooklyn CD/LP (CBS Masterworks, 1987)
- Leningrad Xpress CD/LP (Newtone, 1990)
- Still Life and the Deadman (with the Balanescu String Quartet, Newtone, 1994)
- Symphony 5 (Foom, 2015)
- Condo (Foom Music EP 2017)
- Eighteen (Foom, 2018)

=== W/ Love of Life Orchestra ===
- Extended Niceties EP (Lust/Unlust 1979)
- Geneva LP (Lust/Unlust 1980)
- Casino EP (Italian Records 1982)
- Geneva and Extended Niceties CD (Newtone reissue, 1992)
- Love of Life Orchestra: Quartet CD (New Tone Records, 1995)

=== Justine & Victorian Punks (aka Colette) ===
- "Beautiful Dreamer" b/w "Still You" 12” (Colette is Dead Records 1979/DFA 2010)

=== With "Blue" Gene Tyranny ===
- Trust In Rock CD/LP (Unseen Worlds, 2019)

=== With Tim Burgess ===
- "Oh Men" b/w "I Couldn't Say it To Your Face" (O Genesis 2014)
- "Tracks of My Past" b/w "Like I Already Do" (O Genesis 2015)
- Same Language, Different Worlds CD/LP (O Genesis, 2016)

=== With David Cunningham ===
- The Yellow Box (Piano Records, 1996)

=== With Thomas Fehlman ===
- "Westmusik" 12" (Zickzack Records, 1983)

=== With Robert Ashley ===
- The Bar LP (Lovely Music 1980)
- Music, Word, Fire EP (Lovely Music 1981)
- Perfect Lives (with Robert Ashley et al., Lovely Music, 1991)

=== With Lawrence Weiner ===
- Deutsche Angst (Les Disques du Crépuscule, 1982)
- The Society Architect Ponders the Golden Gate Bridge (excerpt on Bridge Records 2008)

=== With Arthur Russell ===
- "Clean On Your Bean" b/w "Go Bang"
- "Kiss Me Again" 12" (Sire, 1978)
- "Love is Overtaking Me"
- "That Hat" (included on Gordon's record Innocent, 1986)
- Instrumentals (reissued on Audika, 2017)

=== Compilations ===
- Sugar, Alcohol & Meat (Giorno Poetry Systems, 1980)
- Just Another Asshole LP (1981)
- Fruit of the Original Sin (Les Disques du Crépuscule, 1982)
- FabricLive.36, curated by James Murphy & Pat Mahoney (Fabric Records 2007)
- Peter Gordon & Love of Life Orchestra (DFA, 2010)
- Late Night Tales LP/CD (Late Night Tales, 2020)
