= David Van Tieghem =

- Born: 21 April 1955 (age 71); Washington, D.C., U.S.
- Origin: Ridgewood, New Jersey, U.S.
- Genres: Progressive electronic; techno; experimental
- Occupations: Composer; percussionist; sound designer
- Instruments: Percussion; synthesizer; keyboards
- Years active: 1974–present
- Labels: Warner Bros.; Private Music
- Formerly of: Love of Life Orchestra
- Website: vantieghem.com

David Van Tieghem (born April 21, 1955) is an American composer, percussionist and sound designer, best known for his technique of utilizing any available object as a percussion instrument and for his collaborations with the experimental musicians Laurie Anderson, Brian Eno, Steve Reich, Robert Ashley and David Byrne.

== Biography ==
David Van Tieghem was born on April 21, 1955, in Washington, D.C., and was raised in Ridgewood, New Jersey, the first son of artist and educator Joan Ruth Stumpf Van Tieghem and painter, sculptor and designer Richard Francis Van Tieghem, and brother of Richard Joseph Van Tieghem. He graduated from Ridgewood High School in 1973. He studied percussion with Justin DiCioccio, of LaGuardia High School of Performing Arts in New York City. He later attended Manhattan School of Music as a student of the modern percussion pioneer Paul Price. He is married to artist Cate Woodruff and they have one daughter, actress and writer Zoë Van Tieghem.

== Career ==
Van Tieghem received a 2007 Guggenheim Fellowship for Music Composition.

Since 1977, he has been presenting his solo percussion-theater performances in venues throughout the world, including Carnegie Hall, the Composers Showcase series and the Serious Fun! Festival at Lincoln Center.

As a free-lance percussionist, he has worked with Steve Reich, Laurie Anderson, Brian Eno, Talking Heads, David Byrne, Jerry Harrison, Pink Floyd, Stevie Nicks, Nona Hendryx, Peter Gordon and the Love of Life Orchestra, Arthur Russell, Howard Shore, Robert Fripp, Deborah Harry and Chris Stein of Blondie, Nick Rhodes and Simon Le Bon of Duran Duran, Adrian Belew, Chris Spedding, Robert Gordon, John Cale, Mike Oldfield, Tracy Bonham, Ryuichi Sakamoto, Arto Lindsay, Bill Laswell, Jon Gibson, Ned Sublette, Tony Williams, Lenny Pickett, Richard Peaslee, Michael Nyman, Jerry Marotta, John Zorn, Anton Fier, Elliott Murphy, Robert Ashley, Happy Traum and NEXUS Percussion, among others.

As an actor and musician, he has appeared in music theater with Keith Carradine and Ellen Greene at the Joseph Papp Public Theater, in performance art by Robert Longo, in photographs by William Wegman, and in video art by John Sanborn (media artist) and Kit Fitzgerald, and Nam June Paik. He also played several roles in Robert Ashley's television operas, among many other collaborations.

From 1978 to 1983, he played in a number of soundtracks and scores. In 1984, he released his first solo studio album, These Things Happen, on the Warner Bros. Records label. In 1981, he released a video work named "Ear to the Ground". In 1986, he received a Bessie Award (NY Dance and Performance) for Music. In 1987 He appeared on the critically acclaimed album by Jerry Harrison Casual Gods which spawned a No. 7 hit on the US Album Rock Tracks chart: "Rev It Up". The song appeared in the hit movie Something Wild (1986).

Three years after the release of his first album, a second studio album, Safety in Numbers, was released in 1987 by Private Music. The music video for the song "Galaxy" was a minor hit. His third studio album, Strange Cargo, was released in 1989.

Since 1989, Van Tieghem has been composing music for Broadway and Off-Broadway productions, as well as a few film scores. In 1996, he received a Drama Desk Award nomination for Best Sound Design (for The Grey Zone), and was awarded an Obie for Sustained Excellence of Music. In 1998, How I Learned to Drive was awarded the Pulitzer Prize for Drama, and the play completed a run in 1999 at the Mark Taper Forum in Los Angeles, starring Molly Ringwald, with the original director and design team. Van Tieghem was also nominated for a 1998 Drama Desk Award for Outstanding Sound Design for Scotland Road. He received two 1999 Drama Desk Award Nominations - Outstanding Music in a Play for The Turn of the Screw and Outstanding Sound Design for Stop Kiss.

An active musician, composer and sound designer, Van Tieghem scored and sound designed the 2010 Broadway play A Behanding in Spokane, starring Christopher Walken, and collaborated on new work with the choreographers Doug Varone and Elizabeth Streb. He released his fourth studio album, Thrown For A Loop, in 2009.

In 2011, he was the sound designer for the Tony-nominated Broadway revival of Tom Stoppard's Arcadia. He also composed original music and designed sound for the Broadway revivals of Born Yesterday (directed by Doug Hughes) and The Normal Heart (winner of the 2011 Tony Award for Best Revival of a Play, directed by George C. Wolfe and Joel Grey).

He was the sound designer, composer and percussionist for the 2013 Broadway production of Romeo and Juliet, starring Orlando Bloom and Condola Rashad, directed by David Leveaux.

== Discography ==
Studio albums

- These Things Happen (1984)
- Safety in Numbers (1987)
- Strange Cargo (1989)
- Perfect Lives: A Opera for Television (by Robert Ashley) (1991)
- Thrown for a Loop (2009)
- Fits and Starts (2013)

Singles

- "These Things Happen – Remixes" (1984)
- "In-A-Gadda-Da-Vida" (1986)

== Notable collaborations ==
Laurie Anderson:

- Big Science (1982, Warner Bros.)
- United States Live (1984, Warner Bros.)
- Mister Heartbreak (1984, Warner Bros.) with Adrian Belew, Bill Laswell, William S. Burroughs, Nile Rodgers, Peter Gabriel.
- Home of the Brave (1986, Warner Bros.) with Adrian Belew, William S. Burroughs, Nile Rodgers, Joy Askew
- Strange Angels (1989, Warner Bros.)

Talking Heads:

- Speaking in Tongues (1983, Sire/Warner Bros.) with Nona Hendryx, Shankar, Bernie Worrell

Brian Eno & David Byrne:

- My Life in the Bush of Ghosts (1981, Sire/Warner Bros.) with Robert Fripp, Bill Laswell

Arcadia:

- So Red the Rose (1985, Capitol/EMI) with Sting, David Gilmour, Herbie Hancock
