= Robert Ashley =

American composer (1930–2014)

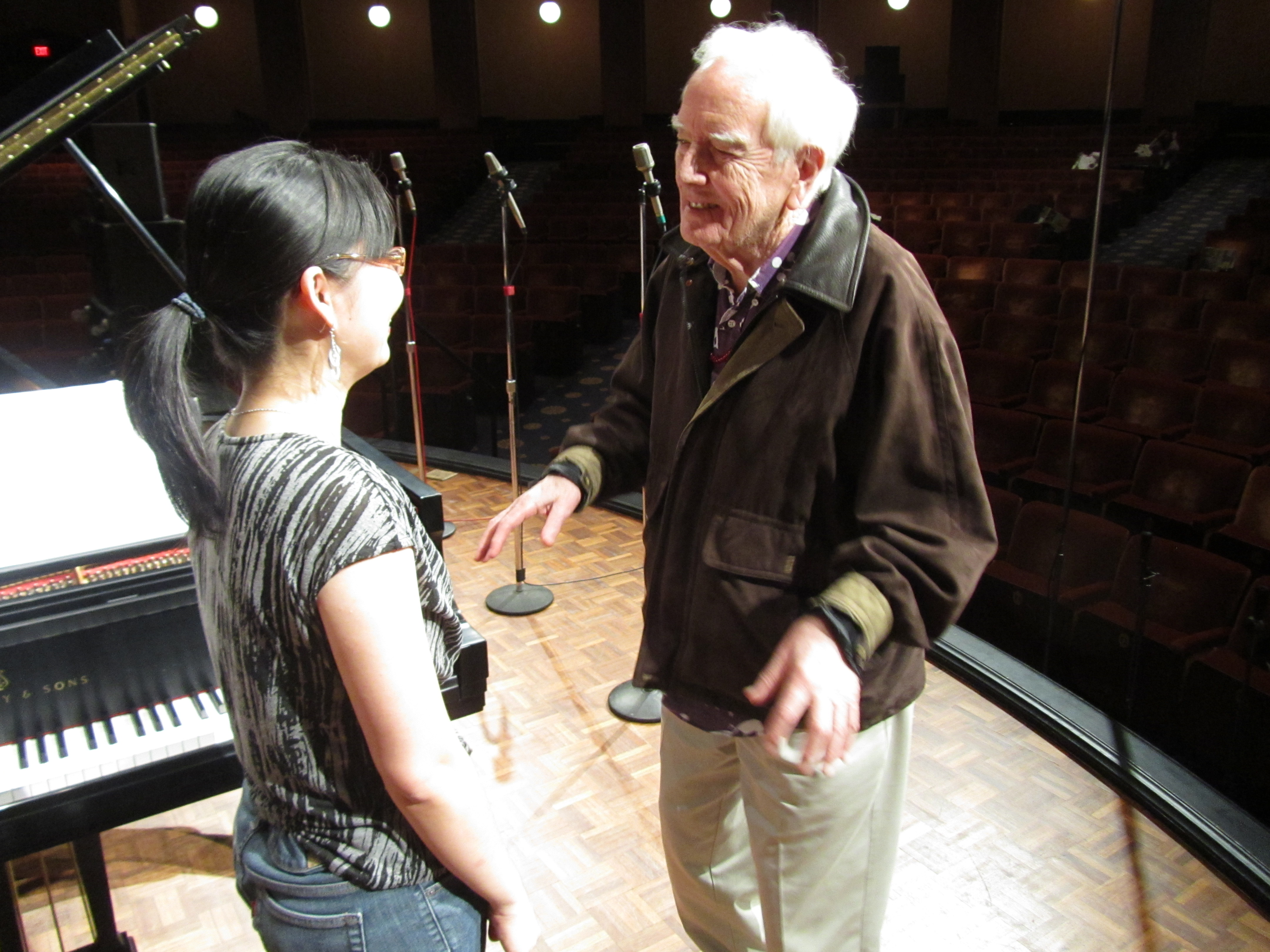
- Robert Ashley in 2010

Background information
- Born: Robert Reynolds Ashley; March 28, 1930; Ann Arbor, Michigan, US
- Died: March 3, 2014 (aged 83) New York City, US
- Genres: Avant-garde; experimental; electronic; theatre
- Occupations: Composer; vocalist; writer
- Years active: 1959–2014

Robert Reynolds Ashley (March 28, 1930 – March 3, 2014) was an American composer, who was best known for his "television operas" and other theatrical works, many of which incorporate electronics and extended techniques. His works often involve intertwining narratives and take a surreal multidisciplinary approach to sound, theatrics and writing, and have been continuously performed by various interpreters during and after his life, including Automatic Writing (1979) and Perfect Lives (1983).

== Life and career ==
Ashley was born in Ann Arbor, Michigan. He studied at the University of Michigan from 1948 to 1952, where he met Ross Lee Finney in 1949. Finney had a good reputation after serving in World War II, in which he was wounded by a land mine. Ashley stated, "Everyone treated him as if he [were] James Bond." Finney went on to approve a paper Ashley wrote on a Bartók string quartet during a weekly analysis seminar. Later, he studied at the Manhattan School of Music, and then became a musician in the US Army. After moving back to Michigan, Ashley worked at the University of Michigan's Speech Research Laboratories. Although he was not officially a student in the acoustic research program there, he was offered the chance to obtain a doctorate, but turned it down to pursue his music. From 1961 to 1969, he organised the ONCE Festival in Ann Arbor with Roger Reynolds, Gordon Mumma, and other local composers and artists. He was a co-founder of the ONCE Group, as well as a member of the Sonic Arts Union, which also included David Behrman, Alvin Lucier, and Gordon Mumma. In 1969, he became director of the San Francisco Tape Music Center. In the 1970s he directed the Mills College Center for Contemporary Music. His notable students include Maggi Payne and Hsiung-Zee Wong.

The majority of Ashley's recordings have been released by Lovely Music, which was founded by Performing Artservices, the not-for-profit management organization which represents Ashley and other artists. His first album with Lovely Music was 1978's Private Parts, an early version of the first and last acts from his opera Perfect Lives. In 1979 and 1980, the label released, respectively, Automatic Writing and Perfect Lives (Private Parts): The Bar (the latter being another excerpt from what was to become Perfect Lives).

Since he first came to prominence, Ashley was indelibly linked to the performance of his pieces, particularly through the use of his voice in such works as Automatic Writing and Perfect Lives. Starting in the 1980s, he formed a band that lasted for decades consisting of himself, Sam Ashley, Joan LaBarbara, Thomas Buckner, and Jacqueline Humbert as vocalists and Tom Hamilton on electronics.

Ashley also collaborated with various artists in terms of reading text. He was featured, alongside Kunga Rinpoche, on Eliane Radigue's 1987 piece Mila's Journey Inspired by a Dream. On December 9, 1992, Ashley publicly read William Gibson's electronic poem Agrippa (A Book of the Dead), on its premiere at The Kitchen in Chelsea, Manhattan. His reading, known as The Transmission, was recorded and simultaneously transmitted to several other cities only once. In the opera Agamemnon, (1993) he performs with singer Shelley Hirsch.

In the final years of his life, Ashley's work was newly taken up by other performers. Notable interpreters of Ashley's work have included the electronic duo Matmos, who often perform their arrangements of episodes from Perfect Lives; Object Collection, who premiered a stage version of Automatic Writing in 2011; the band Varispeed, who've presented various site-specific, day-long arrangements of Perfect Lives since 2011; the band Trystero, who perform Perfect Lives in their memorized marathon arrangement; and Alex Waterman, who spearheaded a new Spanish-language version of Perfect Lives entitled Vidas Perfectas, performing the piece around the world and producing a new video realization as well. In 2002 he received the Foundation for Contemporary Arts John Cage Award. In 2011, Ashley's 1967 opera That Morning Thing was restaged as part of the Performa Biennial with direction from Fast Forward. In 2014, shortly after his death, the Whitney Biennial presented three of Ashley's operas: Vidas Perfectas and The Trial..., both directed by Alex Waterman, and Crash, the opera he finished three months before he died. Crash was remounted a year later at Roulette Intermedium with the same cast: Gelsey Bell, Brian McCorkle, Paul Pinto, Dave Ruder, and Aliza Simons from the music collective Varispeed, as well as Amirtha Kidambi, with projected photos by Philip Makanna.

== Personal life and death ==
He had one son, Sam, from his first marriage to Mary Tsaltas. In 1979, he married his second wife, Mimi Johnson.

He died at his home in Tribeca, Manhattan, on March 3, 2014, from liver disease, aged 83.

== Major works ==
Ashley wrote multiple operas and many other pieces for combinations of instruments, voices, and electronics. A complete list can be found at his official website.

- 1959-1960 "Christopher Columbus Crosses to the New World"
- 1960 "The Bottleman"
- 1963 "In Memoriam...Esteban Gomez"
- 1963 "In Memoriam...Crazy Horse"
- 1963 "In Memoriam...Kit Carson"
- 1964 "The Wolfman"
- 1967-1968 "That Morning Thing"
- 1968 "Purposeful Lady Slow Afternoon"
- 1968 "The Trial of Anne Opie Wehrer and unknown accomplices for crimes against humanity"
- 1972-1973 "In Sara, Mencken, Christ and Beethoven There Were Men and Women"
- 1974-1979 "Automatic Writing"
- 1976 "Music with Roots in the Aether" (television opera)
- 1976-1983 "Perfect Lives" (television opera)
- 1979 "Yellow man with heart with wings"
- 1979 "A last Futile Stab at Fun"
- 1981-1987 "Atalanta (Acts of God)"
- 1982 "Tap Dancing in the Sand"
- Now Eleanor's Idea tetralogy:
1. 1985-1990 "Improvement: Don Leaves Linda"
2. 1987-1992 "eL/Aficionado"
3. 1993 "Now Eleanor's Idea"
4. 1994 "Foreign Experiences"
- 1998 "Dust"
- 1998 "Your Money My Life Goodbye"
- 2003 "Celestial Excursions"
- 2011 "Quicksand"
- 2006-2012 "Concrete/The Old Man Lives in Concrete"
- 2013-2014 "Crash"

== Ashley, Space Theater, and ONCE ==
The Space Theater was a loft specially designed and outfitted for performances with projected images and music. It served as the venue for semiweekly multimedia performances from 1957 to 1964; its creators asked Gordon Mumma and Ashley to produce live electronic music for the productions. The performances included music produced by things such as the "rubbing together of stones" and steel rings thrown along wires.

During their cooperation in Space Theater, Ashley created the Cooperative Studio for Electronic Music in 1958 with Mumma, whom he had originally met in his graduate composition seminars. The studio consisted of little more than spare rooms in each of their houses, where they kept their equipment. Ashley and Mumma were "serious tinkers in electronics," working before synthesizers and electronic musical instruments were commercially available. They invented and built much of their own equipment with materials from Radio Shack. They were two of the earliest composers to work in live generation of music with amplified small sounds.

The success of Space Theater led to the creation of the ONCE festival, a contemporary performing arts event that served as a forum for experimental art and music. Ashley was the director. Other musician participants included Roger Reynolds, George Cacioppo, Bruce Wise, and Donald Scarvada. Other collaborating artists were Harold Borkin and Joseph Wehrer, architects; George Manupelli, filmmaker; and Mary Ashley and Milton Cohen, painter-sculptors. There were six ONCE festivals between 1961 and 1965. They were considered "far-out" and controversial, and experienced both support and antagonism from the surrounding community in Ann Arbor. The festivals invited European and jazz composers to participate, and were a major influence on contemporary music of the time.

== Trilogy: Atalanta, Perfect Lives, and Now Eleanor's Idea ==
The operas of Perfect Lives, Atalanta, and Now Eleanor's Idea comprise a trilogy that maintains a pulse of 72 beats per minute throughout (except for the opera Foreign Experiences within the Now Eleanor's Idea tetralogy, which is set to a quarter note=90). The third episode of Perfect Lives ("The Bank") contains the focal event of this trilogy. The event itself is hard to describe; after a variety of strange events transpire at the bank, i.e. a fight between dogs that speak Spanish and a bucket of water strategically thrown on the bank manager, it is realized that the bank "has no money in the bank," a consequence of the art/crime action taken by the elopers Gwyn and Ed. In describing these curious events, Ashley introduces all of the bank tellers ("Introducing Susie. Susie works at the bank. That's her job. Mostly she helps people count their money. She likes it."), who each have visions, each representing one of the trilogy's operas.

Kate sees the security camera footage from the bank, which contains elements of Episodes 2 through 4 of Perfect Lives. She is, in effect, watching herself. Linda, Susie, and Jennifer see visions of the three suitors of Atalanta, Willard Reynolds, Bud Powell, and Max Ernst, who have accidentally appeared in a spaceship at the moment of the bank incident. Eleanor's vision is conceptually of the four operas that bear her name, although Linda's vision introduces its four characters (Linda, Eleanor, Don, and Junior Jr.) as a foursome. The first section of the opera Now Eleanor's Idea, entitled Improvement, features a retelling of these events.

=== Now Eleanor's Idea tetralogy ===
Now Eleanor's Idea is an opera tetralogy, part of the larger trilogy described above, based on the idea of heading westward in America, eventually arriving at the Pacific Ocean. Each opera is centered on one of the characters briefly introduced in Episode 3 of Perfect Lives. According to Kyle Gann, the order of the tetralogy is (1) Improvement (representing Linda, one of the bank tellers), (2) el/Aficionado (representing Don Jr, i.e. "D, the Captain of the Football Team"), (3) Foreign Experiences (representing Junior Jr., Don and Linda's Son), and (4) Now Eleanor's Idea (representing Now Eleanor, another teller). According to Gann, the overall four-part structure of the cycle mirrors the four-movement symphonic form.

These works are subtle in their narrative links to one another. The flow from Perfect Lives leads to Now Eleanor's Idea (the opera, not the tetralogy), focusing on Eleanor and her journey from Midwestern-small-town bank teller to television news reporter to prophet for the Southwestern Hispanic low rider car culture. Don's story is chronicled in Foreign Experiences. Don has moved to California with his family and becomes a professor. Unsatisfied with his existence, Don embarks on a mystical quest. Improvement (Don Leaves Linda) focuses on Linda—here a metaphor for the Jews forced out of Spain in 1492—who is abandoned by her husband Don at a highway rest stop. Linda meets many characters in her travels, including a tap dancer who is a stand-in for Giordano Bruno, and settles into a cosmopolitan existence with her son, Junior Jr. In a dream that echoes the uncertain journey of his father, Junior, Jr.'s opera, el/Aficionado, is a post-mortem on a mysteriously botched exercise in espionage. Ashley says that each of these scenarios is in reality the simultaneous dream of the protagonist, happening at the focal moment of Perfect Lives.

Ashley, along with Sam Ashley, Thomas Buckner, Jacqueline Humbert, and Joan LaBarbara, performed the complete tetralogy in 1994 in Avignon and at the Brooklyn Academy of Music. Recordings of the operas have been released gradually, first with Improvement in 1992, followed by el/Aficionado in 1994, Foreign Experiences in 2006, and Now Eleanor's Idea in 2007.

=== Additional allegory ===
Ashley has ascribed various meanings to the individual elements of the trilogy. One layer of meaning is the journey, presumably of European-Americans, westward across America. Atalanta represents those in the new world who are acutely aware of their tradition in the old world. This is represented in the lengthy stories on great figures of the past (the "Anecdotes", etc.). Perfect Lives represents life in the Midwest, which Ashley was interested in "because it was flat". The stories have gotten shorter and are now just quaint colloquialisms and idioms (think of the string of phrases punctuated by "AND" in Episode 4). Now Eleanor's Idea is about the journey beyond the familiar to the West Coast, presumably the end of the world, i.e. a certain civilization was established when European adventurers found themselves in California and figured they would likely never make it home. Rather than anecdotes and sayings, the story telling unit in these operas is much smaller, and hence the language is more abstract. Ashley says in the liner notes to Atalanta that the three works represent "architecture, agriculture, and genealogy", respectively.

Ashley has also described the Now Eleanor's Idea tetralogy as cataloging four American varieties of religion: Judaism in Improvement, Pentecostal Evangelism in Foreign Experiences, "corporate mysticism" in el/Aficionado, and Roman Catholicism as derived from Spain in Now Eleanor's Idea.

== Automatic Writing ==
Automatic Writing is a piece that took five years to complete and was released by Lovely Music Ltd. in 1979. Ashley used his own involuntary speech that results from what he says is his Tourette syndrome as one of the voices in the music. This was considered a very different way of composing and producing music. Ashley stated that he wondered since Tourette's had to do with "sound-making and because the manifestation of the syndrome seemed so much like a primitive form of composing whether the syndrome was connected in some way to his obvious tendencies as a composer".

Ashley was intrigued by his involuntary speech, and the idea of composing music that was unconscious. Seeing that the speech that resulted from having Tourette's could not be controlled, it was a different aspect from producing music that is deliberate and conscious, and music that is performed is considered "doubly deliberate" according to Ashley. Although there seemed to be a connection between the involuntary speech, and music, the connection was different due to it being unconscious versus conscious.

Ashley's first attempts at recording his involuntary speech were not successful, because he found that he ended up performing the speech instead of it being natural and unconscious. "The performances were largely imitations of involuntary speech with only a few moments here and there of loss control". However, he was later able to set up a recording studio at Mills College one summer when the campus was mostly deserted, and record 48 minutes of involuntary speech. This was the first of four "characters" that Ashley had envisioned of telling a story in what he viewed as an opera. The other three characters were a French voice translation of the speech, Moog synthesizer articulations, and background organ harmonies. "The piece was Ashley's first extended attempt to find a new form of musical storytelling using the English language. It was opera in the Robert Ashley way".

=== Use of electronics ===
In the dialogue for Automatic Writing, the words themselves were not necessarily the primary source of meaning—especially not after the kind of audio manipulation Ashley used to modify them. Some of the dialogue became totally incomprehensible. Ashley appreciated the use of voice and words for more than their explicit denotation, believing their rhythm and inflection could convey meaning without being able to understand the actual phonemes.

Ashley engineered the first version of the piece using live electronics and reactive computer circuitry. He recorded his vocal part himself, with the mic barely an inch from his mouth and the recording level just shy of feedback. He then added "subtle and eerie modulations" to the recording, modifying his voice to the point that much of what he read could not be understood.

The piece included four vocal parts that changed over the life of the piece, but in the final recording, the pieces included Ashley's monologue, a synthesized version, a French translation of the monologue, and a part produced by a Polymoog synthesizer.

== The Immortality Songs ==
While still completing his "grand trilogy" of Perfect Lives, Atalanta, and Now Eleanor's Idea, in 1987 Ashley commenced work on The Immortality Songs, a series that would occupy him for the rest of his life – and a project that he undertook aware that he "might not live to finish" it. Following his continual interest in forms of speech, the immortality songs are all invested in ranting as a form of uncontrolled speech. Ashley commenced this series by writing a list of forty nine titles for projects (not only operas), the rhythm of the title often influencing the rhythm of the subsequent project or opera (most especially within Your Money My Life Goodbye [1998]). Several of these projects include: Yellow Man with Heart with wings (opera, originally from 1979, remixed in 1990 to become the first of The Immortality Songs), Regards to Natalie Wood (Poem, 1990), Outcome Inevitable (Orchestral, 1991), Love is a good example (Lecture to be sung, 1991), When Famous Last Words Fail You (Lecture to be sung, 1997), Dust (Opera, 1998), Your Money My Life Goodbye (Opera, 1998), Yes, but is it edible? (Lecture to be sung, 1999), Celestial Excursions (opera, 2003), Practical Anarchism (Lecture to be sung, 2003), Hidden Similarities (Adapted from a section of Concrete, opera, 2005), and Concrete (opera, 2006). The sections of Concrete itself contain some of the titles from his list.

== Films ==
- 1976 - Music With Roots in the Aether: Opera for Television. Tape 7: Robert Ashley. Produced and directed by Robert Ashley. New York, New York: Lovely Music.
- 1983 - Perfect Lives (an opera for television). Released on DVD by Lovely Music, 2005. Directed by John Sanborn, featuring "Blue" Gene Tyranny, Jill Kroesen and David Van Tieghem.
- 1984 - Atalanta Strategy. Released on VHS by Lovely Music. Draws from a variety of sections of the opera and features performative commentary from Ashley himself.

== Books ==
- 1991 - Perfect Lives: an opera. Published by Burning Books, edited by Melody Sumner Carnahan. Libretto plus lectures by Ashley.
- 2000 - Music With Roots in the Aether. Published by MusikTexte. Transcriptions of the television opera with introductory essays by various composers before each section.
- 2010 - Outside of Time: Ideas About Music. Published by MusikTexte, edited by Ralf Dietrich.
- 2011 - Quicksand. Published by Burning Books. A Quadrants Series Novel.
- 2011 - Atalanta (Acts of God). Published by Burning Books. Libretto plus afterword by Ashley.
- 2014 - Crash. Published by Burning Books. Libretto by Ashley.

== Exhibitions ==
- Robert Ashley - Perfect Lives, 2011, Trade (gallery), Nottingham, United Kingdom
