= Gordon Mumma =

American composer (born 1935)

Gordon Mumma (born March 30, 1935, in Framingham, Massachusetts) is an American composer. He is known most for his work with electronics, many devices of which he builds himself, and for his performances on horn.

== Biography ==
Mumma entered the University of Michigan in 1952 at age 17, after dropping out of high school. He dropped out of Michigan after a year, but the connections he made in Ann Arbor were the foundation of much of his musical career. His early work was in piano, and his musical development drew on traditional composers such as Bach and Haydn, as well as modern composers such as Bartók, Schoenberg, Webern, and Ives.

Mumma's performances on piano were often in the context of piano ensembles, partnered with John Cage, David Tudor, and other performers. He toured internationally in the 1960s in a two-piano performance collaboration with Robert Ashley. He cofounded Ann Arbor's Cooperative Studio for Electronic Music with Ashley in 1958–66, was a cofounder of the ONCE Festival in 1961–66 in Ann Arbor, was a resident composer with the Merce Cunningham Dance Company alongside Cage and Tudor from 1966–74, and was a member of the Sonic Arts Union with Ashley, Alvin Lucier, and David Behrman.

Mumma was professor of music at the University of California-Santa Cruz from 1975 to 1994, where his composition students included Chris Brown, Joe Hannan, Dan Keller, Daniel James Wolf, Jonathan Segel, and Mamoru Fujieda. Mumma also has a close association with Mills College in Oakland, California, where he was the Darius Milhaud Professor in 1981, Distinguished Visiting Composer in 1989, and Jean Macduff Vaux Composer-in-Residence in 1999. He was awarded a Foundation for Contemporary Arts John Cage Award (2000).

Mumma currently lives in Victoria, British Columbia, where he continues to compose.

== Films ==
- 1976 - Music With Roots in the Aether: Opera for Television. Tape 4: Gordon Mumma. Produced and directed by Robert Ashley. New York, New York: Lovely Music.

== See also ==
- Shiraz Arts Festival
