= Gene Tyranny =

American musician (1945–2020)

Robert Nathan Sheff
- Also known as: "Blue" Gene Tyranny
- Born: Joseph Gantic; January 1, 1945; San Antonio
- Died: December 12, 2020 (aged 75) Long Island City

Robert Nathan Sheff (January 1, 1945 – December 12, 2020), known professionally as "Blue" Gene Tyranny, was an American avant-garde composer and pianist.

"His memorable pseudonym, coined during his brief stint with Iggy and the Stooges, was derived partly from Jean, his adoptive mother’s middle name," wrote Steve Smith, in his New York Times obituary for Tyranny. "It also referred to what he called 'the tyranny of the genes' — a predisposition to being 'strongly overcome by emotion,' he said in Just for the Record: Conversations With and About 'Blue' Gene Tyranny, a documentary film."

== Early life ==
Tyranny was born Joseph Gantic in San Antonio on January 1, 1945, to William and Eleanor Gantic. Later that year, after his birth father, an Army paratrooper, went missing in the Asian theater of World War II, his mother put him up for adoption. He was adopted by Dorothy and Meyer Sheff of San Antonio, who changed his name to Robert Nathan Sheff. Tyranny was raised in the Lutheran church. He studied piano with Meta Hertwig and Rodney Hoare, and composition with Otto Wick and Frank Hughes.

== Career ==
Tyranny began his performance career in high school, playing pieces by major composers (such as John Cage) with Philip Krumm in a concert series in San Antonio. He toured with the Carla Bley Band in 1977 and the Prime Movers (which included Iggy Pop and Michael Erlewine) as well as Iggy & The Stooges. "After releasing the album Raw Power in 1973, [Pop] invited his former bandmate to join him on tour," Steve Smith noted in his New York Times obituary for Tyranny. "Mr. Tyranny accepted, performing with red LED lights woven into his hair." He performed on albums by Laurie Anderson (Strange Angels), David Behrman (On the Other Ocean), John Cage (Cheap Imitation and Empty Words), Peter Gordon, and Robert Ashley (Perfect Lives, Dust, Celestial Excursions), with whom he frequently collaborated. Tyranny composed and performed the song "Choral Ode 3" for the 1993 opera Agamemnon.

He taught at Mills College from 1971 to 1982, where his students included composer Hsiung-Zee Wong, and also worked at the Center for Contemporary Music at Mills. He moved to New York in 1983 and received a Bessie in 1988 and in 1989 a Composer Fellowship from the NY Foundation for the Arts.

Tyranny was a contributor for AllMusic, reviewing albums and creating biographies for many notable contemporary artists.

According to Kyle Gann in the Village Voice, Tyranny had "Cecil Taylor's keyboard energy [and] Morton Feldman's ear." "The most original aspect of [his] works," wrote Gann, "is the way they create continuity: they're tonal, yet rigorously asymmetrical. They satisfy the ear without letting it take anything for granted. They evolve...with the labyrinthine irreversibility of deep psychic forces." In another Voice article, Gann was lyrical in his evocation of Tyranny's virtuosity: "God plays the piano through this man. Science cannot explain the speed with which trillions of inspired brain impulses zip through his...hands, resulting in note-perfect works...the 1988 Kitchen improv-with-delay [The Intermediary Following Traces of the Song]...I called 'the most inspired piano performance I've ever heard.' It still is. At his schmaltziest ("Sunrise or Sunset in Texas") he's like Keith Jarrett on an extremely good day. At his best, it's like listening to Ives improvise 'Hawthorne' from the Concord Sonata."

In October 2020, Just for the Record: Conversations With and About "Blue" Gene Tyranny, a documentary film directed by David Bernabo, premiered at the TUSK Festival 2020. In a review of the film for The Wire, Joshua Minsoo Kim wrote, "Hearing Tyranny talk and learning how he lived his life encourages one to go the same way."

Tyranny died in hospice in Long Island City, Queens, on December 12, 2020, of complications of diabetes.

In David Bernabo's documentary film Just for the Record: Conversations With and About ‘Blue’ Gene Tyranny, Tyranny said music was a source of solace, but also a means “of deeply informing myself that there’s another world. Music is my way of being in the world.”

== Discography ==
- Out of the Blue (1977 Lovely Music LML 1061 [LP], 2007 Unseen Worlds UW01 [CD])
- Real Life and the Movies, Vol. 1 (1981 Fun Music 21 [cassette], 2024 Unseen Worlds UW048 [digital reissue])
- The Intermediary (1982 Lovely Music [LP] 1063, 2008 Lovely Music [CD])
- Country Boy Country Dog (How To Discover Music in the Sounds of Your Daily Life) (1994 Lovely Music LCD 1065)
- Free Delivery (1999 Lovely Music LCD 1064)
- Take Your Time (2003 Lovely Music LCD 1066)
- The Somewhere Songs/The Invention of Memory (2008 Mutable 17529-2 [CD])
- Detours (2012 Unseen Worlds UW07 [CD])
- Trust in Rock (2019 Unseen Worlds UW18)
- Degrees of Freedom Found (2021 Unseen Worlds UW35 [CD])
