= Mike Vernusky =

- Born: April 1, 1978 (age 48)
- Origin: Austin, Texas
- Genres: Electronic, Electroacoustic, Isolationist Ambient, Noise, Acoustic, Radiophonic, Electro-Theatre
- Years active: 2004 – present
- Label: Quiet Design
- Website: www.vernusky.net www.quietdesign.us

Mike Vernusky (born April 1, 1978) is an American composer, performer and record label owner. He writes music for concertized, theatrical, and filmic environments, primarily through the use of electronic media and live performance. His music has been described as "brash" by the New York Times and 'isolationist ambient' by Wire Magazine. In addition to having his works performed globally, Vernusky has made numerous speaking appearances about the urgency of artistic entrepreneurism including the EMS 2010 Festival in Shanghai and as a regular guest at El Centro Mexicano para la Musica y Artes Sonoras in Morelia, Mexico.

== Awards and commissions ==
Mike Vernusky received First Prize in electronic music at the Digital Art Awards in Tokyo in 2004. In 2008, Vernusky received a commission from El Centro Mexicano para la Musica y Artes Sonoras to write a new work for guitar and electronic sound. His work 'Nylah' for classical guitar was completed during a residency in Mexico and later featured on Spectra: Guitar in the 21st Century, released on Quiet Design. Vernusky was also the recipient of the MATA Commission, where he collaborated with filmmaker Daniel Maldonado. Their cinematic installation work, The Hidden, premiered in New York City over the course of four nights of the 2009 MATA festival.

== Quiet Design ==
In 2007, Mike Vernusky and Cory Allen came together as co-owners and co-curators of the avant-garde record label Quiet Design. The highly acclaimed label has released works by over 30 artists in 10 countries. Some notable Quiet Design artists are Tetuzi Akiyama, Alvin Lucier, Jandek, Keith Rowe, Erdem Helvacioglu, Yoshio Machida.

== Discography ==
- Mike Vernusky, Music for Film and Electro-Theatre CD/Digital (2010, (United States) Quiet Design)
- Various, Spectra: Guitar in the 21st Century CD/Digital (2009, (United States) Quiet Design)
- Various, Deep Wireless 6: Water, Air, Sound (2009, (Canada) , New Adventures in Sound Art)
- Various, Resonance: Steel Pan in the 21st Century CD/Digital (2007, (United States) Quiet Design)
- Various, Computer Music Journal: Sound and Video Anthology Vol. 31, 4 DVD/Digital (2007, (United States) MIT Press)
- Mike Vernusky, Blood that Sees the Light CD/Digital (2007, (United States) Quiet Design)
