= Cory Allen (author) =

American author, podcast host, musician, composer

- Born: February 22, 1982 (age 43)
- Origin: Austin, Texas
- Genres: Minimalism, sound art, avant-garde
- Occupation(s): Author, podcast host, musician, composer, mastering engineer
- Years active: 2005–present
- Labels: Quiet Design, Students of Decay
- Website: www.cory-allen.com www.alteredear.com

Cory Allen (born February 22, 1982) is an author, podcast host, musician, composer, and mastering engineer. On his podcast The Astral Hustle, he speaks with experts in mindfulness, neuroscience, and philosophy. Allen writes about mindfulness, meditation, and self-development. Music released under his own name is usually categorized as minimal avant-garde composition and has been described as 'clever and intricate structures that will repay the careful ear.'

== Podcast ==
In 2015, Cory began hosting a podcast called The Astral Hustle. The show has had millions of downloads and was featured in The New York Times.

== Books ==
Allen authored a book on modern mindfulness and meditation titled Now Is the Way (2019, Penguin Random House).

== Quiet Design ==
In 2007, Cory Allen and Mike Vernusky came together as co-owners and co-curators of the avant-garde record label Quiet Design. The highly acclaimed label has released works by over 30 artists in 10 countries. Some notable Quiet Design artists are Tetuzi Akiyama, Alvin Lucier, Jandek, Keith Rowe, Sebastien Roux, Erdem Helvacioglu, Duane Pitre, Yoshio Machida, Kim Myhr, Mark Cetilia and Nick Hennies. The label ceased publication in 2013.

== Selected discography ==
- The Source LP/CD (2015, United States Punctum Records)
- w/ Duane Pitre The Seeker and the Healer LP (2014, United States Students of Decay)
- The Great Order LP (2013, United States Quiet Design)
- Pearls LP (2013, United States Quiet Design)
- One Digital (2012, United States (No Label)
- w/ Steinbruchel Seam CD (2012, United States Quiet Design)
- w/ Marcus Fischer Two / Twenty-Two Digital (2012, United States)
- Still CD/Digital (2011, United States Quiet Design)
- Pearls CD/Digital (2010, United States Quiet Design)
- Hearing is Forgetting the Name of the Thing One Hears CD/Digital (2009, United States Quiet Design)
- Spectra: Guitar in the 21st Century CD/Digital (2009, United States Quiet Design)
- The Fourth Way CD/Digital (2008, United States Quiet Design)
- w/ SIRSIT Colorblind Cycle II CD (2008, Spain Con V)
- w/ SIRSIT Colorblind Cycle I CD (2007, United States, Bremsstrahlung Recordings)
- Satori in Atlantis Digital (2007, Portugal, Test Tube)
- Observing A Warmth Digital (2007, Spain, Con V)
- Resonance: Steel Pan in the 21st Century CD/Digital (2007, United States Quiet Design)
- Gesemi Tropisms CD/Digital (2005, United States, Bremsstrahlung Recordings)
