= Hildegard Kleeb =

Swiss pianist

- Born: 1957 (age 68–69); Richenthal, Switzerland
- Occupation: Pianist
- Style: 20th-century classical music, Free improvisation
- Website: www.hildegard-kleeb.ch

Hildegard Kleeb (born 1957 in Richenthal, Willisau District) is a Swiss pianist.

== Life and works ==
After her first piano and oboe lessons in music school in Zug, she studied piano under Cécile Hux and oboe under Hans-Martin Ulbrich at Zurich Music school from 1978 to 1982. She also studied later under Eric Gaudibert in Geneva, under Claude Helffer in Paris and under Jürg Wyttenbach at the City of Basel Music Academy. In 1990, she was a visiting scholar at the academy of plastic arts in Helsinki and from 1992 to 1995 at the Wesleyan University in Connecticut in the United States, where she also worked in Anthony Braxton ensemble in New York City and in Javanesian Gamelan orchester. She began to work there with Anthony Braxton, Alvin Lucier and Christian Wolff. She is married with the trombonist Roland Dahinden.

=== Performer / pianist ===
Kleeb is an international performer of 20th-century classical music and improvisator. She has performed in the following institutions and events: Archipel Festival Genève, Musikfestwochen Luzern, Donaueschingen Festival, Kunsthalle Basel, Knitting Factory NYC, Gesellschaft für akustische Lebenshilfe Kiel, Steirischer Herbst Graz, Bludenzer Tage für Neue Musik, Musiktage Rümlingen, Merkin Concert Hall NYC, Theater Casino Zug, Pori Art Museum, Concert Hall Göteborg, Crowell Concert Hall Wesleyan University Connecticut, The Kitchen NYC, Kunsthaus Zug, Kunstmuseum Cacéres E, Kunstmuseum Badajos E, Madrid Concert Hall, Ballhaus Berlin, Swiss Institut NYC, Kunstmuseum Boros, Yale University Gallery, Porgy & Bess Wien, Künstlerbegegnungen St.Lambrecht A, Museu Serralves Porto.

Kleeb has participated in the first performances of Peter Ablinger, Maria de Alvear, Anthony Braxton, John Cage, Roland Dahinden, Hauke Harder, Bernhard Lang, Alvin Lucier, James Tenney, Daniel Wolf and Christian Wolff.

Interdisciplinary collaboration with the visual artists like Stephane Brunner, Philippe Deléglise, Inge Dick, Daniela Keiser and Roman Singer.

=== Works and projects ===
- Since 1987 duo with Roland Dahinden
- Since 1992 trio Dahinden-Kleeb-Polisoidis
- Since 2003 duo with Pelayo Fernandez Arrizabalaga
