= Commanderies of the Order of Saint John =

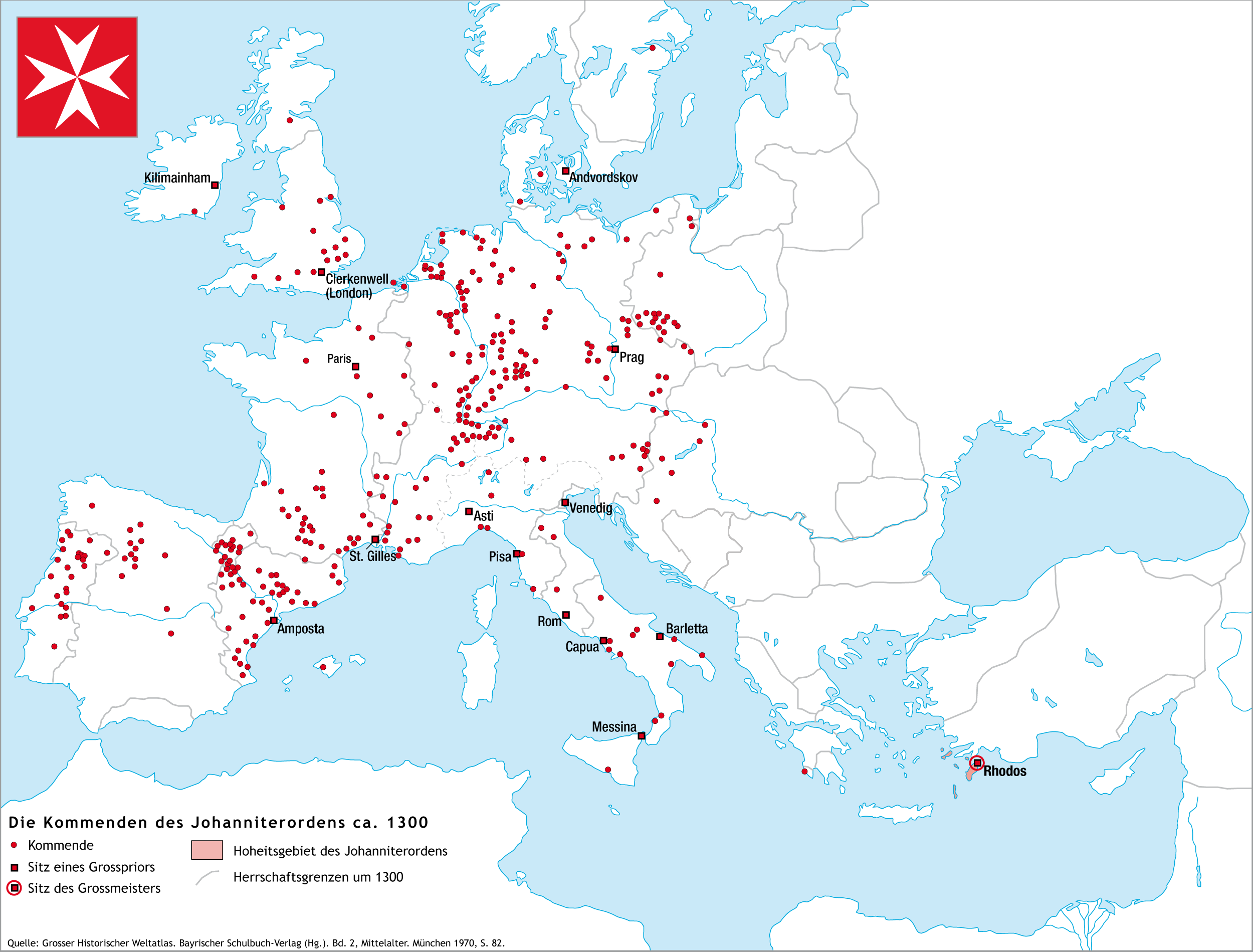
Map of commandries of the Order of Saint John in 1300

The Order of Saint John (Knights of Malta, Knights Hospitaller) was organised in a system of commanderies during the high medieval to early modern periods, to some extent surviving as the organisational structure of the several descended orders that formed after the Reformation.

In the Late Middle Ages, the bulk of possessions of the order were in the Holy Roman Empire, France, Castile, Aragon and Portugal, but they extended into Poland, Hungary, southern Italy, England and Denmark, with individual outliers in Ireland, Scotland, Sweden and Greece (the main seat of the order was in Rhodes from 1310 until 1522, and in Malta from 1530 until 1798).

== Pre-Reformation ==
Before the Protestant Reformation, the Order was divided into seven langues or tongues. The langues were divided into great priories, some of which were further divided into priories or bailiwicks (ballei), and these were in turn divided into commanderies.

The largest of the langues by far was the "German" one, which included not only all of the Holy Roman Empire but also the non–German-speaking (Slavic and Hungarian) territories east of Germany. It was divided into five great-priories, the largest of which were Austria-Bohemia and Germany, in turn, divided into major priories or bailiwicks; one of the largest such became independent after the Protestant Reformation as the Order of Saint John (Bailiwick of Brandenburg).

The division of Latin Europe, on the other hand, was more fine-grained, into the Hispanic (Iberian peninsula, at first known as the "Aragonese" langue, but in 1462 split into the Aragonese and the "Castilian" langue, the latter including Castille, Léon and Portugal), Italian (Italian peninsula), Provençal, Auvergnat and French langues.

Finally, the English langue included the order's possessions in the British Isles.

=== German tongue ===
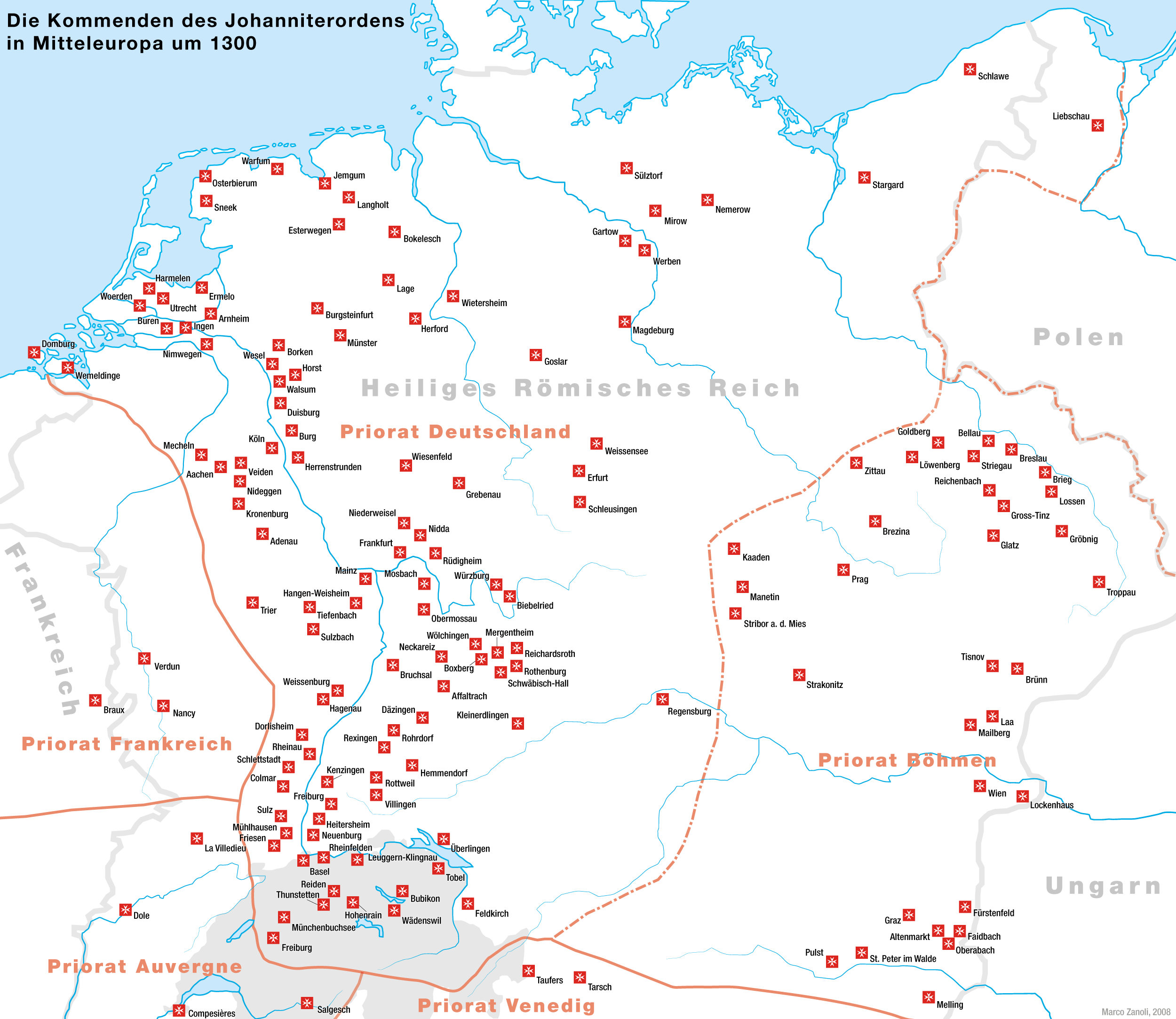
Commanderies of the German tongue in 1300

- great priory Bohemia-Austria
  - priory Bohemia: commanderies Český Dub, Březina, Glatz, Kadaň, Manětín, Pfaden, Ploschkowitz, Prague, Strakonice, Mies
  - priory Moravia: commanderies Brno, Ivanovice na Hane, Horní Kounice, Opava
  - priory Silesia: commanderies Beilau, Breslau, Brieg, Goldberg, Gröbnig bei Leobschütz, Groß-Tinz, Klein-Öls, Löwenberg, Reichenbach, Striegau
  - priory Oberlausitz: commanderies Zittau, Hirschfelde
  - priory Archducal Austria: commanderies Mailberg, Laa an der Thaya, Lockenhaus, Vienna
  - priory Inner Austria: commanderies Altenmarkt, Feldbach, Fürstenfeld, Graz, Komenda, Melling, Marburg, Pulst, Übersbach
- great priory Germany: The great priory of Germany was divided into eight bailiwicks (Balleien). From 1428, the seat of the great priory was at Heitersheim in Upper Germany.
  - Ballei Brandenburg (since 1538 the independent Order of Saint John (Bailiwick of Brandenburg)): commanderies Braunschweig (formerly Templars), Garlow, Goslar, Lage, Lagow, Lietzen, Mirow, Nemerow, Quartschen, Rörchen, Schlave, Schivelbein, Schwiebus, Sonnenburg, Stargard, Sülzdorf, Süpplingenburg (formerly Templars), Tempelhof (formerly Templars), Tempelburg (formerly Templars), Werben, Wietersheim, Wildenbruch, Zielenzig, Zachan
  - Ballei Franken (Franconia): commanderies Reichardsroth, Rothenburg ob der Tauber, Würzburg, Biebelried, Mergentheim, Schwäbisch Hall
  - Ballei Köln (Cologne)
    - Bergisches Land: commanderies Burg an der Wupper, Herkenrath, Herrenstrunden, Marienhagen
    - Niederrhein: commanderies Dinslaken, Duisburg, Walsum,
    - Rhineland: commanderies Adenau, Velden bei Düren, Cologne, Niederbreisig (1312), Mechelen bei Aachen (1215), Aachen (1313)
  - Ballei Oberdeutschland (Upper Germany)
    - Mainz (1282)
    - Breisgau: Freiburg, Heitersheim
    - Swabia: commanderies Überlingen, Villingen, Rottweil
    - Alsace: commanderies Colmar (hospital since the late 12th century, commandery before 1234), Dorlisheim (before 1217), Hagenau, Mulhouse (1220), Rheinau (1260), Sulz (c. 1250), Schlettstadt (1260), Strasbourg (1371)
    - Lothringen (Lorraine): commanderies Metz (12th century), Puttelange-aux-Lacs
    - Eidgenossenschaft (Swiss Confederacy): Basel (c. 1200), Bubikon (c. 1192), Biberstein, Biel, Fribourg, Hohenrain (c. 1175), Klingnau, Küsnacht, Leuggern, Münchenbuchsee (1180–1528/29), Reiden (ca. 1284–1807), Rheinfelden (1212–1806), Salgesch (ca. 1235–1655), Thunstetten (ca. 1192–1528), Tobel (1226–1809), Wädenswil (ca. 1300–1549)
  - Ballei Thüringen (Thuringia): Weißensee
  - Ballei Utrecht (Netherlands): commanderies Arnheim, Buren, Haarlem, Ingen, Kerkwerve, Middelburg, Nimwegen, Montfoort, Sneek, Utrecht, Waarder, Wemeldinge
  - Ballei Westfalen (Westphalia): commanderies Münster, Heford, Bokelesch, Steinfurt
  - Ballei Wetterau: commanderies Mosbach im Bachgau (1218, to Frankfurt in 1400), Nidda, Frankfurt, Nieder-Weisel (ca. 1245–1809), Rüdigheim (Neuberg), Wiesenfeld (Burgwald), Wildungen
- great priory Hungary: Bjelovar (today in Croatia), Buda, Csurgó, Gran, Stuhlweissenburg (Székesfehérvár), Újudvar
- great priory Poland
- great priory Dacia (Denmark): Antvorskov, Odense, Schleswig, Viborg

=== Spanish and Portuguese tongue ===
- great priory Portugal: commanderies Aboim, Algoso, Amieira, Barrô, Belver, Chavão, Covilhã, Coimbra, Faia, Flor da Rosa, Fontelo, Leça do Balio, Montenegro, Moura Morta, Oliveira do Hospital, Oleiros, Puerto Marin, Poiares, Sta. Marta Penaguião, Sertã, Sobral, Távora, Trancoso, Vera Cruz, Santarém
- great priory Amposta
- great priory Castille
- great priory Navarra

=== Italian tongue ===
- great priory Barletta
- great priory Capua
- great priory Sicily
- great priory Rome
- great priory Pisa
- great priory Lombardy
- great priory Venice

=== Provencal tongue ===
- great priory St. Gilles
- great priory Toulouse

=== Auvergnat tongue ===
- great priory Auvergne

=== French tongue ===
- great priory France
- great priory Aquitania
- great priory Champagne

=== English tongue ===
- great priory England
- great priory Scotland
- great priory Ireland

== After the Reformation ==
A "Russian Grand Priory" with no less than 118 commandries, dwarfing the rest of the Order, was established by Paul I of Russia after the French occupation of Malta in 1798, initiating the Russian tradition of the Knights Hospitaller. Paul's election as Grand Master was, however, never ratified under Roman Catholic canon law, and he was the de facto rather than de jure Grand Master of the Order.

The commandry system survives into the present era, but since the Protestant Reformation the order is split into the four "Alliance orders" of the German Order of Saint John (Bailiwick of Brandenburg), the British Most Venerable Order of the Hospital of Saint John of Jerusalem, the Swedish Johanniterorden i Sverige, and the Dutch Johanniter Orde in Nederland, the Order forms the Alliance of the Orders of St. John of Jerusalem and the Roman Catholic Sovereign Military Order of Malta.

The German (Brandenburg) branch comprises seventeen commandries in Germany, one each in Austria, Finland, France, Hungary, and Switzerland, and a global commandry with subcommandries in twelve other countries (Australia, Belgium, Canada, Colombia, Denmark, Italy, Namibia, Poland, South Africa, the United Kingdom, the United States, and Venezuela).

Following constitutional changes made in 1999, the Priory of England and The Islands was established (including the Commandery of Ards in Northern Ireland) alongside the existing Priories of Wales, Scotland, Canada, Australia (including the Commandery of Western Australia), New Zealand, South Africa, and the United States. In 2013, the Priory of Kenya and in 2014 the Priory of Singapore were formed. Each is governed by a Prior and a Priory Chapter. Commanderies, governed by a Knight or Dame Commander and a Commandery Chapter, may exist within or wholly or partly without the territory of a priory, known as Dependent or Independent Commanderies, respectively. Any country without a priory or commandery of its own is assumed into the "home priory" of England and The Islands, many of these being smaller Commonwealth of Nations states in which the order has only a minor presence.

== See also ==
- Langue (Knights Hospitaller)

== Bibliography ==
- Elizabeth II (1974), "Supplemental Royal Charter, 1974", in Elizabeth II (ed.), Royal Charters and Statutes of the Most Venerable Order of the Hospital of St. John of Jerusalem, 5, Westminster: Queen's Printer (published 2004), p. 6
