= CINC (disambiguation) =

CINC may refer to:

- Činč, a Serbian band formed by Đorđe Ilić and Luka Stanisavljević in 2001
- Commander-in-chief, the person or body that exercises supreme operational command and control of a nation's military forces
- Composite Index of National Capability, a statistical measure of national power created by J. David Singer for the Correlates of War project in 1963
- The Commander-In-Chief (born Berit Hagen in 1989), a Norwegian female guitarist and singer
- Centre d'instruction des nageurs de combat (Combat Divers Training Centre), the former training centre for army commando frogmen within the French Action Division
- CINC (CINC is not Chef), a fully free software based on Progress Chef
