= Langnau bei Reiden =

Former municipality, canton of Lucerne

- Former municipality
- Location of Langnau bei Reiden
- Location within Switzerland Location within Canton of Lucerne
- Coordinates: 47°13′48″N 7°57′42″E
- Country: Switzerland
- Canton: Lucerne
- District: Willisau
- Municipality: Reiden

Population (2005)
  - Total: 1,190
- Time zone: UTC+01:00 (CET)
  - Summer (DST): UTC+02:00 (CEST)
- SFOS number: 1134
- ISO 3166 code: CH-LU
- Website: Profile (in German),

Langnau bei Reiden is a former municipality in the Willisau constituency (Wahlkreis) of the canton of Lucerne, Switzerland. Since 2006 it has been part of the municipality of Reiden, together with Richenthal. Its territory comprised the village of Langnau in the valley of the Wigger and the hamlet of Mehlsecken.

== History ==
Langnau is first mentioned around 900 as Langunouva. The site of Ottenstein Castle (Burgstelle) lies in the forest above Mehlsecken. Before 1036 the Lenzburgs gave the estate (Hof) of Langnau to the chapter of Beromünster. The chapter was the manorial lord of Langnau, Richenthal and Mehlsecken and held the low jurisdiction there until 1478, when the free men of the town of Willisau and of the county of the same name acquired the manorial rights, while the low jurisdiction passed to Lucerne. The high jurisdiction lay with the county of Willisau, which Lucerne had bought in 1407. In 1803 the municipality was assigned to the district (Amt) of Willisau, and in 2013 to the constituency of the same name.

Langnau bei Reiden belonged to the parish of Richenthal. After the commandery of the Knights Hospitaller at Reiden was founded (before 1284), Mehlsecken and the lower part of the village came to the parish of Reiden. Langnau received its own chapel in 1599 (dedicated to the Virgin Mary, enlarged in 1669, blown up in 1975) and a parish church in 1972. It became an independent parish in 1948, but a church municipality (Kirchgemeinde) only in 1973.

Langnau's local customary law (Twingrecht) was set down early, in 1420. Two property corporations (Realkorporationen) existed as successor bodies: Langnau, which was converted into a maintenance cooperative in 2004, and Mehlsecken, which was converted into a cooperative under public law in 2020. The citizens' community (Bürgergemeinde) merged into the residents' municipality (Einwohnergemeinde) in 1991. The tax district (Steuerbrief) of Langnau also included Richenthal (until 1844) and Mehlsecken. In 1856 Mehlsecken, which had previously been independent as a police community (Polizeigemeinde), was incorporated into the municipality of Langnau bei Reiden.

Around 1600 the medieval open-field system (Zelgensystem), with an upper and a lower field in the Wigger valley and a third field in the Altental and on the Weierbach, was pushed back by privately owned irrigated meadows (Wässerwiesen and Wässermatten). In 1998–1999 a land consolidation was completed and the federal land register was introduced. The important mill at Mehlsecken is first mentioned in 965. A weaving mill established there in 1903 burned down in 1929. The Wigger was regulated several times (1498, 1977, 1991), as was the Huebbach (1922, 2001). Langnau has been connected to the national railway network since 1856 (with its station in Reiden) and to the national road network since 1980 (the A2, with an exit at Mehlsecken). For a long time Langnau kept the character of a farming village with a high tax burden and little industry. In the late 1990s the share of commuters grew as several housing developments were built.

Langnau bei Reiden had about 680 inhabitants in 1695, 808 in 1798, 1,091 in 1837, 1,168 in 1850, 826 in 1900, 1,145 in 1950, 996 in 1980, 1,206 in 2000 and 1,190 in 2005.

== Bibliography ==
- Max Huber, Langnau im Wiggertal. Eine Ortsgeschichte, 1996
- Adolf Reinle, Das Amt Willisau mit St. Urban, 1959, pp. 124–127 (Die Kunstdenkmäler des Kantons Luzern, 5)

=== Sources ===
- August Bickel (ed.), Freiamt, Grafschaft, Landvogtei Willisau, 2002, p. 243 (Sammlung Schweizerischer Rechtsquellen, LU II/2/1)
