= Panayiotis Kokoras =

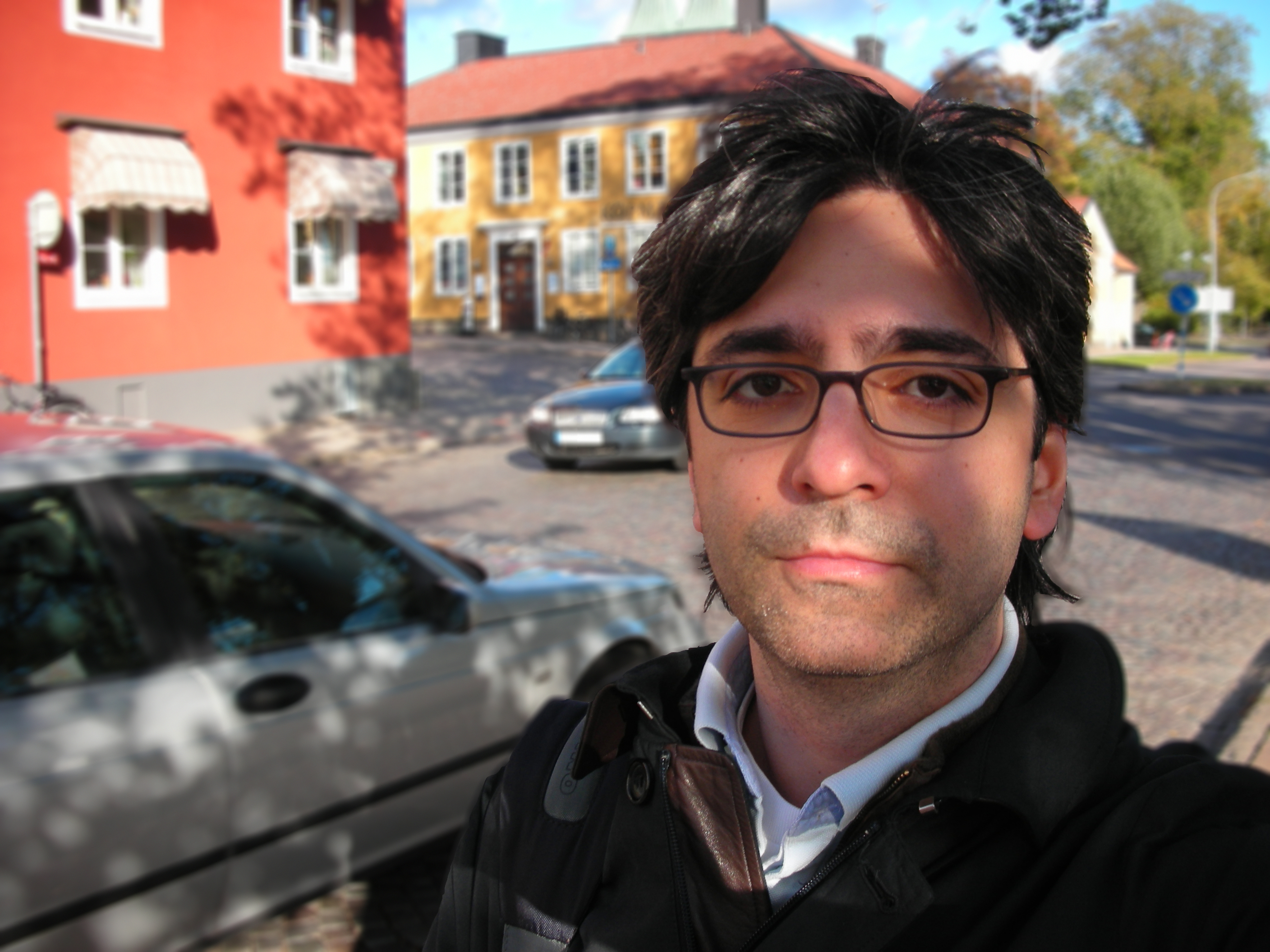
Panayiotis Kokoras, 2010

Panayiotis Kokoras (Greek: Παναγιώτης Κόκορας; born 1974, Ptolemaida) is a Greek composer and computer music innovator. Kokoras's sound compositions use timbre as the main element of form. His concept of "holophony" describes his goal that each independent sound (φωνή), contributes equally into the synthesis of the total (ὅλος). In both instrumental and electroacoustic writing, his music calls upon a "virtuosity of sound," emphasizing the precise production of variable sound possibilities and the correct distinction between one timbre and another to convey the musical ideas and structure of the piece. His compositional output is also informed by musical research in Music Information Retrieval compositional strategies, Extended techniques, Tactile sound, Augmented reality, Robotics, Spatial sound, Synesthesia. He is founding member of the Hellenic Electroacoustic Music Composers Association (HELMCA) and from 2004 to 2012 he was board member and president.

== Studies ==
Kokoras studied composition with I. Ioannidi and Anri Kergomard as well as classical guitar with E. Asimakopoulo in Athens. In 1999 he moved to England, for postgraduate studies at the University of York, where he completed his MA and PhD in composition with T. Myatt with funds from the Arts and Humanities Research Board (AHRB) and Aleksandra Trianti Music Scholarships (Society Friends of Music) among others.

== Compositions ==
His works have been commissioned by institutes and festivals such as the Fromm Music Foundation (Harvard), IRCAM (France), MATA (New York), Gaudeamus (Netherlands), ZKM (Germany), IMEB (France), Siemens Musikstiftung (Germany) and have been performed in over 400 concerts around the world.

== Distinctions ==
His compositions have received 61 distinctions and prizes in international competitions, and have been selected by juries in more than 130 international calls for scores.

- Destellos Prix 2011, Argentina
- Prix Ars Electronica 2011, Austria
- Gianni Bergamo Classic Music Award 2007, Switzerland
- Pierre Schaeffer 2005, Italy
- Musica Viva 2005 and 2002, Portugal
- Look and Listen Prize 2004, New York
- Gaudeamus 2004 and 2003, The Netherlands
- Bourges Residence Prix 2004, France
- Insulae Electronicae 2003, Italy
- Jurgenson Competition 2003, Russia
- Seoul international competition 2003, Korea
- Takemitsu Composition Award 2002, Japan
- Noroit Prize 2002, France
- CIMESP 2002, Brazil
- Musica Nova Prize 2001, Czech Republic
- Métamorphoses 2000, Belgium.

== Teaching ==
As an educator, Kokoras has taught at the Technological and Educational Institute of Crete, and, the Aristotle University of Thessaloniki (Greece). Since fall 2012 he has been appointed assistant professor at the University of North Texas.

== Articles ==
Panayiotis Kokoras, Olivier Pasque (2008) Conference of Intersciplinary Musicology (CIM) Sound Scale: perspectives on the contribution of flute's sound classification to musical structure. Greece.

Panayiotis Kokoras (2007) Journal of Music and Meaning (JMM) Towards a Holophonic Musical Texture. JMM 4, Winter 2007, section 5. University of Southern Denmark. Denmark.

Panayiotis Kokoras (2005) Electronic Musicological Review – Vol. IX October 2005 – Morphopoiesis: A general procedure for structuring form. Federal University of Paraná. Brazil.

== Discography ==
His music is published by Spectrum Press, NOR, Miso Musica, SAN/CEC, Independent Opposition Records, ICMC2004 and distributed in limited editions by LOSS, Host Artists Group, Musica Nova, and others.
