= Amorfon =

Amorfon is a Japanese experimental music record label, located in Tokyo. It was founded in 2004 by Yoshio Machida. Amorfon releases experimental and avant-garde music from all genres - from Electronica to World music.

== Amorfon Releases ==
- amorfon001 - Fitz Ellarald : The very air seems replete with humming and buzzing melodies (CD, 2004)
- amorfon002 - Yoshio Machida : Infinite Flowers (CD, 2004)
- amorfon003 - Činč : Shine of Wot? (CD, 2004)
- amorfon004 - V.A. : *Music for Baby! (CD, 2004)
- amorfon005 - V.A. : Kindermusik: Improvised Music by Babies (CD, 2005)
- amorfon006 - Yoshio Machida : Naada (CD, 2006)
- amorfon007 - Horkeskart : Live in Solitude (CD, 2006)
- amorfon008 - Činč : Polyphonic Poetry (CD, 2006)
- amorfon009 - Walk With The Penguin : Steal A Spoon For You (CD, 2007)
- amorfon010 - Gene Bowen : Bourgeois Magnetic (CD, 2007)
- amorfon011 - Yoshio Machida : Van Cleef & Arpels Exhibition Soundtracks (CD, 2010)
- amorfon012 - Talgung : Anura (CD, 2011)
- amorfon013 - V.A. : Baby Rap: Voice Performance by Babies (CD, 2013)
- amorfon014 - Jorge Queijo / Hiroki Chiba / Yoshio Machida : Luminant (CD, 2016)
- amorfon015 - ŠIROM : I (CD, 2016)
- amorfon016 - Yoshio Machida : Tender Blues (CD, 2016)
- amorfon017 - Walk With The Penguin : Charm (CD, 2017)

== Artists ==
- Fitz Ellarald
- Yoshio Machida
- Činč
- Horkeskart
- Walk With The Penguin
- Gene Bowen
- Casiotone for the Painfully Alone
- DAT Politics
- minamo
- BusRatch
- Alejandra & Aeron
- Ryoichi Kurokawa
- Toshya Tsunoda
- Marko Ciciliani
- Andres F. Krause
- Benjamin Deutsch
- Myona Sonobe
- Maya Konishi
- Alyssa Elliott
- Erophey Dobrovolski
- Kristina Postic
- Goh Yokota
- Hinata Miyazaki
- Aoi Sato

== See also ==
- List of record labels
