= I Am Sitting in a Room =

Sound art piece by Alvin Lucier

- by Alvin Lucier
- Genre: Process music; sound art
- Language: English
- Composed: 1969: Brandeis University
- Performed: 1970: Guggenheim Museum
- Recorded: 1969: Electronic Music Studio at Brandeis

I Am Sitting in a Room is a sound art piece by the American composer and sound artist Alvin Lucier composed in 1969.

The piece features Lucier recording himself narrating a text, and then playing the tape recording back into the room while re-recording it. The new recording is then played back and re-recorded, and this process is repeated. Due to the room's particular size and geometry, certain resonant frequencies are emphasized while others are attenuated. Eventually the words become unintelligible, replaced by the characteristic resonance of the room.

In his book on the origins of minimalism, Edward Strickland wrote that "In its repetition and limited means, I Am Sitting in a Room ranks with the finest achievements of Minimal tape music. Furthermore, in its ambient conversion of speech modules into drone frequencies, it unites the two principal structural components of Minimal music in general."

== History and performances ==
Lucier was inspired to create I Am Sitting in a Room after a colleague mentioned attending a lecture at MIT in which Amar Bose described how he tested characteristics of the loudspeakers he was developing by feeding back audio into them that they had produced in the first place and then was picked up via microphones.

The first recording of I Am Sitting in a Room was made at the Electronic Music Studio at Brandeis University in 1969. The second recording was made in March 1970 in Lucier's apartment in Middletown, Connecticut.

The first performance of the work was in 1970 at the Guggenheim Museum in New York. In collaboration with his partner Mary Lucier, the performance featured projections of Polaroid photographs that had been degraded like the voice.

A third, higher fidelity recording of I Am Sitting in a Room lasting over forty minutes was released by Lovely Music in 1981.

Lucier performed the piece during the 2012 Venice Biennale Musica at the Teatro alle Tese, and a recording of this performance was commercially released on the 2016 album Alvin Lucier / Alter Ego: Two Circles.

Some of the last performances by Lucier included one at MIT's "Seeing/Sounding/Sensing" symposium in September 2014, and the full collaborative piece was performed for the first time in over 50 years as part of the New Ear Festival at the Fridman Gallery in New York in 2019.

== Full text ==
The text spoken by Lucier describes the process of the work, concluding with a reference to his own stuttering:

I am sitting in a room different from the one you are in now. I am recording the sound of my speaking voice and I am going to play it back into the room again and again until the resonant frequencies of the room reinforce themselves so that any semblance of my speech, with perhaps the exception of rhythm, is destroyed. What you will hear, then, are the natural resonant frequencies of the room articulated by speech. I regard this activity not so much as a demonstration of a physical fact, but more as a way to smooth out any irregularities my speech might have.

In live performances, Lucier would substitute "the same as" for "different from".

== Subsequent works ==
In 2010, YouTube user Patrick Liddell created an homage to I Am Sitting in a Room entitled VIDEO ROOM 1000, in which he uploaded a video of himself speaking text similar to Lucier's original to YouTube, then manually downloaded and re-uploaded it 1,000 times in sequence over the course of a year, in order to demonstrate the resulting digital artifacting of audio and video analogously to Lucier's original demonstration of analog artifacting of audio. In 2019, Marques Brownlee created his own version inspired by Liddell, where he recorded himself speaking in a similar manner, and then subsequently downloaded through YouTube Studio's "Download" feature, and reuploaded it 1,000 times. According to him, he did his own version because, "[...] with changes in scale and different codecs, YouTube's processing has evolved a bit since then," referring to how YouTube uses the VP9 and AV1 codecs now, and YouTube now supporting HD / 4K video, although YouTube did technically already support HD, starting in 2009.

In 2013, filmmakers Viola Rusche and Hauke Harder decided to use I Am Sitting in a Room as the "main structuring element" of the documentary "No Ideas but In Things" (2013). According to the filmmakers' notes, "the various process steps of the piece [I Am Sitting in a Room] divide the film into chapters so that this work serves as an integral part of the film."

In 2022, the American shoegaze band Nothing, with producer Seth Manchester, released a limited edition vinyl-only album, Don’t Look For Light In Tunnels, influenced by I Am Sitting in a Room.

== See also ==
- Music on a Long Thin Wire
- The Disintegration Loops
