= Clocker =

Clocker(s) may refer to:

- Clocker (train), a former Amtrak rail service
- Clocker (composition), a minimalist electronic music piece by Alvin Lucier conceived in 1978
- Clockers (novel), a 1992 novel by Richard Price
- Clockers (film), a 1995 film by Spike Lee based on the Price novel
