= Quiet Design =

Music label in Austin, Texas

Quiet Design is an independent music and sound art label based in Austin, Texas, and founded in 2007. Owned and curated by composers Mike Vernusky and Cory Allen, Quiet Design has released work by over 30 artists from 10 countries. It has been said of Quiet Design that their "intriguing and often brilliant recordings will open your eyes, your ears, and very likely your mind."

The label's focus is releasing electronic music and sound art that is described as minimal, avant-garde and experimental. The packaging for each release is custom tailored to the sound of each piece in the catalog.

== Artists on Quiet Design ==
Tetuzi Akiyama, Cory Allen, Jim Altieri, Christopher Ariza, Alfredo Barros, Daniel Blinkhorn, Mark Cetilia, Thomas Dempster, exclusiveOr, Fires Were Shot, Guy Gelem, Glen Hall, Glen Charles Halls, Erdem Helvacioglu, Nick Hennies, Jandek, Kioku, Clara Latham, Alvin Lucier, Yoshio Machida, Paula Matthusen, Alex Mincek, Kim Myhr, Alex Ness, Damian O'Riain, Duane Pitre, Sam Pluta, Sebastien Roux, Keith Rowe, Josh Russell, Paul Russell, Jeff Snyder, Kate Soper, Steinbruchel, Peter Swendsen, and Mike Vernusky

== Catalog ==
- Cory Allen, The Great Order, 2013
- Steinbruchel + Cory Allen, Seam, 2012
- Cory Allen, Still, 2011
- Guy Gelem, Tides, 2011
- Fires Were Shot, Awakened by a Lonely Feud, 2011
- Cory Allen, Pearls, 2010
- Mike Vernusky, Music for Film and Electro-Theatre, 2010
- Alvin Lucier / Nick Hennies, Still and Moving Lines of Silence in Families of Hyperbolas, 2010
- Mark Cetilia, Anemoi, 2009
- Cory Allen, Hearing is Forgetting the Name of the Thing One Hears, 2009
- Glen Hall / Glen Charles Halls, Northern Dialogues, 2009
- Duane Pitre, ED09, 2009
- Various, Spectra: Guitar in the 21st Century, 2009
- Various, The Language Of, 2008
- Cory Allen, The Fourth Way, 2008
- Kioku, Live 6.14.08, 2008
- exclusiveOr, S/T, 2008
- Josh Russell, Sink, 2008
- Kioku, Both Far and Near, 2008
- Various, Resonance: Steel Pan in the 21st Century, 2007
- Mike Vernusky, Blood that Sees the Light, 2007
