= Činč =

Serbian band

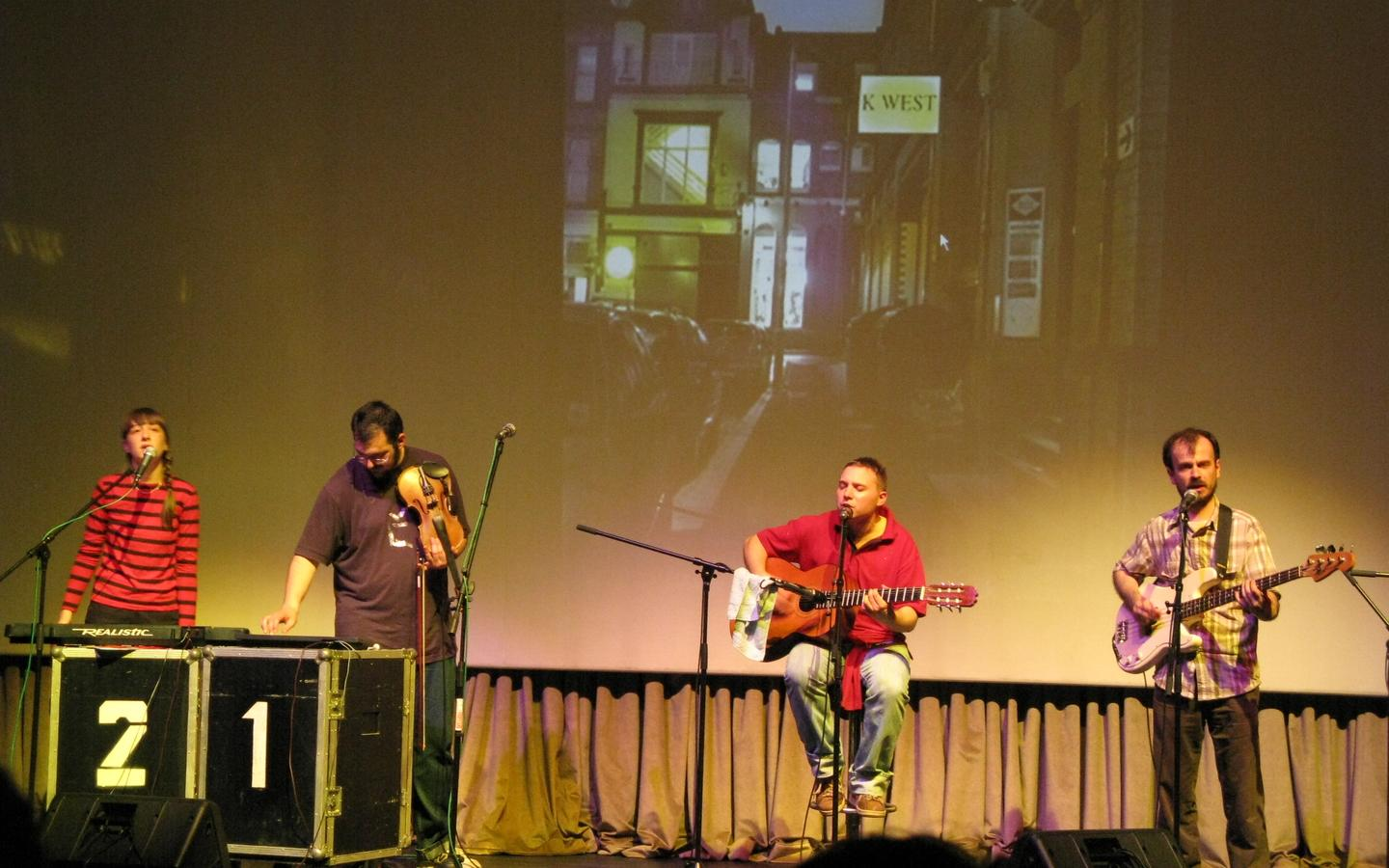
- Činč in DK Studentski grad, May 5, 2008

Background information
- Origin: Serbia, Belgrade
- Genres: Psychedelic folk, Chamber pop, Comedy rock, Alternative rock, Indie rock, Post-rock
- Years active: 2001 — present
- Labels: Amorfon, Templum, Listen Loudest, Kornet
- Members: Luka Stanisavljević; Đorđe Ilić; Irena Vanić; Srđan Stojanović
- Website: cincplug.com

Činč (Serbian Cyrillic: Чинч, pronounced [tʃintʃ]) is a Serbian band that Đorđe Ilić and Luka Stanisavljević formed in 2001. Before that, the duo performed for several years under the name Čudan Šimijev Bend. In 2003 and in 2004, respectively, Irena Vanić and Srđan Stojanović joined the band. Činč's notable features are weird lyrics, sophisticated melodies and peculiar scene acting. The band performs at cultural centers, libraries, galleries, radio stations and Belgrade's botanical garden. Činč’s collaborations includes artists like Yoshio Machida, Marko Brecelj (ex-Buldožer), Saša Marković Mikrob, and strip-workshop Šlic.

== Discography ==
Mornar Popeče
This song is originally from album Ponašanje (2003). This is the version from the various artists compilation Šta treba maloj deci (2007).

=== Studio albums ===
- Osečev sjaj (Škart, 2001, reissue Amorfon, 2004)
- Ponašanje (Templum, 2003, reissue Listen Loudest, 2007)
- Polyphonic Poetry (Amorfon, 2006)
- Kalendář (independent web release, cincplug.com 2011)

=== Various artists compilations ===
- Music for Baby (Amorfon, 2004)
- 11. bombardiranje Njujorka (Listen Loudest, 2007)
- Šta treba maloj deci (Kornet, 2007)

== Band members ==
- Luka Stanisavljević — bass guitar, guitar, vocals, Matrix decoder
- Đorđe Ilić — guitar, vocals, percussions
- Irena Vanić — vocals
- Srđan Stojanović — violin, vocals
