= Music On A Long Thin Wire =

Musical piece by Alvin Lucier

″Music on a Long Thin Wire" is a musical piece by Alvin Lucier conceived in 1977.

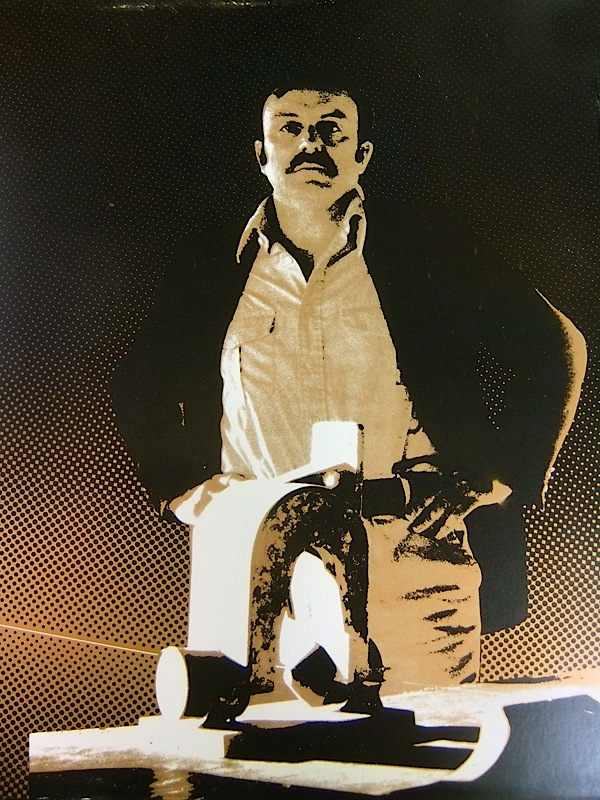
Alvin Lucier behind the horseshoe magnet used to induce vibrations to the wire (Cover detail from the LP, Lovely Music 1980)

In his own words (1992): "Music on a Long Thin Wire is constructed as follows: the wire is extended across a large room, clamped to tables at both ends. The ends of the wire are connected to the loudspeaker terminals of a power amplifier placed under one of the tables. A sine wave oscillator is connected to the amplifier. A magnet straddles the wire at one end. Wooden bridges are inserted under the wire at both ends to which contact microphones are embedded, routed to a stereo sound system. The microphones pick up the vibrations that the wire imparts to the bridges and are sent through the playback system. By varying the frequency and loudness of the oscillator, a rich variety of slides, frequency shifts, audible beats and other sonic phenomena may be produced."

However, Lucier admits a long thin wire was at first only used to avoid the look of a laboratory experiment in favour of a more sculptural appearance; a short thin wire would have worked as well. He discovered that the best way to produce variation in the sonic phenomena was to pick a setting and leave the setup alone. He praised David Rosenboom for his ability to pick interesting settings.

It has been exhibited:

- 1979, Winrock Shopping Center, Albuquerque, and broadcast uninterrupted on KUNM (FM) for five days and nights
- 1980, Landmark Center, Saint Paul
- 1983, Western Front, Vancouver BC
- 1988, Gallery of the Center for the Arts at Wesleyan, Middletown, CT
- 2011, Tom Duff was duplicating the 1979 performance from Albuquerque on sfSoundRadio, an internet radio station from the San Francisco bay area, again broadcasting uninterrupted for five days (April 8–12).
- 2013, Brno, Czech Republic, The Exposition of New Music Festival
- 2015, Dartmouth College, DAX: Dartmouth's Digital Arts Exhibition
- 2017, Ostrava, Czech Republic, Ostrava Days Music of Today Institute and Festival

== See also ==
- I Am Sitting in a Room, Lucier composition also based on resonance
