= Daniel James Wolf =

American composer (born 1961)

Daniel James Wolf (born September 13, 1961) is an American composer.

== Studies ==
He was born in Upland, California. Wolf studied composition with Gordon Mumma, Alvin Lucier, and La Monte Young, as well as musical tunings with Erv Wilson and Douglas Leedy and ethnomusicology (M.A., Ph.D. 1990 Wesleyan University). Important contacts with Lou Harrison, John Cage, Walter Zimmermann. Managing Editor of the journal Xenharmonikon, 1985-89. Based in Europe from 1989, he is known as a member of the "Material" group of composers, along with Hauke Harder and others.

== Compositions ==
Wolf's compositions apply an experimental approach to musical materials, with a special interest in intonation, yet often display a surface that playfully - if accidentally - recalls historical music. Works include The White Canoe, an opera seria for hand puppets to the libretto by Edward Gorey, six string quartets, Figure & Ground for string trio, Field Study for vn, tb, ban, gui, Decoherence for x orchestras of x players, Twoity fl,pf and A Beckett Gray Code for wind quintet. Much of his music is in just intonation, but his work with alternative tunings includes a collection of Etudes in all equal temperaments between 8 and 23 notes per octave.

Wolf identifies with the experimental music tradition—especially its American West Coast manifestation—spiritually, intellectually and personally. He jokingly calls his method "dysfunctional harmony" or "not yet tonal", with some reference to the "anarchic harmony" found in the late music of John Cage. Three distinct streams combine to form Wolf's work: sound installations, experimental concert works based on sound structures mostly free from historical associations, and experimental concert works based on reifying the tradition of European art music (or other world musics) and then performing operations on its internal principles.
