= Photobatik =

Photographic technique

Photobatik is one of Photogram techniques produced by a Japanese artist Yoshio Machida in the 1990s. Photograms are produced by partial exposure and development of the entire photosensitive surface. Photobatik is "whole exposure and partial development." Machida has expanded his technique to overexposure of the photographic paper followed by only fixing the image, resulting in a pink image.
