= Marko Ciciliani =

Composer, audiovisual artist and performer (b. 1970)

Marko Ciciliani (born 23 February 1970) is a composer, audiovisual artist and performer.

== Life ==
Marko Ciciliani (born 1970 in Zagreb, Croatia) is a composer and sound artist. His family emigrated to Germany in 1971, where he grew up primarily in Karlsruhe.

Ciciliani began his musical studies in 1990 at the Hochschule für Musik und Theater Hamburg, studying composition and music theory with Ulrich Leyendecker. From 1993 to 1994, he studied at the Manhattan School of Music in New York City with Nils Vigeland. He then returned to Hamburg to complete his studies with Manfred Stahnke. In 1996, he moved to Amsterdam, Netherlands, where he undertook postgraduate studies at the Royal Conservatory of The Hague until 1998, working with Clarence Barlow and Louis Andriessen.

Ciciliani resided in Amsterdam until 2010, working as a freelance composer and active participant in the Dutch music scene. From the early 2000s, he increasingly focused on sound engineering and electronic music performance. He has performed with numerous orchestras and ensembles, including the Royal Concertgebouw Orchestra, the Melbourne Symphony Orchestra, the SWR Orchestra, MusikFabrik, and ASKO.

In 2007, Ciciliani began a PhD at Brunel University London under the supervision of Bob Gilmore and Johannes Birringer. He completed his doctorate in 2010 with a thesis on the interrelationships between visual media and music, particularly the use of light designs in compositions. The title of his thesis is "Dirty light: The application of musical principles to the organisation of light as an extension of musical expression into the non-figurative visual realm."

In 2010, he moved to Austria to take up a teaching position at the University of Music and Performing Arts, Vienna. In 2011, he became a guest professor at the Institute of Electronic Music and Acoustics (IEM) at the University of Music and Performing Arts Graz. In October 2014, he was appointed full professor of computer music composition and sound design at the IEM.

In 2026 Ciciliani was awarded the biannual nomination-based Andrzej-Dobrowolski-Prize of the land Styria, one of the highest distinctions for composition in Austria.

== Work ==
=== Open Form Period ===
Marko Ciciliani's early works already hinted at a deep fascination with open forms, a concept that became central to his compositions from 1999 onwards. This fascination stemmed, in part, from his admiration for the music of John Cage, which significantly influenced his decision to study in New York City with Nils Vigeland, a close collaborator of Cage. Ciciliani's interest in open forms wasn't merely theoretical; he sought practical ways to implement and expand upon these principles within his own work, exploring the possibilities of indeterminacy and improvisation within structured frameworks.

To translate the concepts of open form and algorithmic composition into the realm of electronic sound synthesis, Ciciliani began utilizing SuperCollider in 2001. This powerful programming language provided him with the tools necessary to manipulate and shape sound in innovative ways, pushing the boundaries of traditional composition. SuperCollider's flexibility allowed him to create complex systems that could generate and process sound in real-time, opening up new avenues for exploring the dynamic and unpredictable nature of open form. His exploration of open form reached a significant milestone with the premiere of his live installation "Map of Marble" at the Zagreb Biennale in 2005. This ambitious project represented the culmination of his work with open forms up to that point, showcasing his ability to create dynamic and evolving sonic landscapes. The installation invited audiences to experience music not as a fixed entity, but as a fluid and interactive process, reflecting the core principles of open form. "Map of Marble" became a landmark work in Ciciliani's oeuvre, demonstrating his mastery of both compositional technique and cutting-edge technology, and highlighting his ability to create immersive and engaging artistic experiences.

The year 2005 also saw the release of his CD "Voor het Hooren Geboren" (Born for Hearing), featuring open form chamber music performed by the ensemble Intégrales. This album provided a valuable insight into Ciciliani's approach to open form within the context of acoustic instruments, revealing the depth and breadth of his compositional thinking. The pieces on the album showcased his ability to create intricate and engaging musical structures that embraced spontaneity and improvisation, while still maintaining a cohesive artistic vision. The album demonstrated that open form wasn't solely a domain of electronic music, but could be effectively applied to traditional instrumental settings as well. "Voor het Hooren Geboren" served as a testament to Ciciliani's versatility as a composer, demonstrating his ability to work effectively across different mediums and musical styles. It further cemented his reputation as an innovator in the field of contemporary music, showcasing his commitment to exploring new possibilities in musical expression.

=== Improvisation and No-input Mixer ===
From 2000 Ciciliani started experimenting with electronic improvisation. Between 2001 and 2005 he co-organized the concert series Kraakgeluiden in Amsterdam with Anne LaBerge. This weekly series featured electronic improvised music and became an important center for the experimental music scene in the Netherlands.

As an instrument for improvisation Ciciliani used a no-input mixer, a mixing board in which internal feedbacks are generated by connecting the outputs to the inputs. In 2008 he released the CD "81 matters in elemental order" which was entirely produced and composed with the no-input mixer. Shortly after this release he stopped performing with the no-input mixer.

=== Audiovisual works ===
Ciciliani started to work with lighting as an important part of his compositions in 2003. This became one of his main areas of interest which also led to his dissertation at Brunel University in 2010. In 2005 he founded his own ensemble “Bakin Zub”, which focussed on multimedia works which combine instrumental parts, live-electronics and visuals. Bakin Zub's last public appearance was in 2014, when it premiered Ciciliani's program-length work "Suicidal Self Portraits" at the festival Forum Neuer Musik Deutschlandfunk in Cologne.

More recently, Ciciliani has primarily worked with live-video in his audiovisual works, as for example in his solo compositions "Via" or "Formula minus One". After having realized two works using laser in 2007 and 2009, he used this medium again in his "Steina" for violin, live-electronics, live-video and laser.

In 2015 Ciciliani produced a book titled "Pop Wall Alphabet". It is a transmedia work combining 4.5 hours of music (included as a DVD with the book), roughly 300 pages of digitally generated texts and 27 images. The work is based on condensations of material from publications of pop music, be it as superimpositions of songs, rearranged texts or combined artworks as images. The music was described a "monlythic verticalisation of sound". The focus of this work is a study of perception and acoustic pareidolias.

In 2019 Ciciliani's publication titled "Transgressions" was released by ChampDAction in Antwerp. It consist of a book with an integrated USB stick that contains four audiovisual compositions. Furthermore, the book contains a reprint of his text "Music in the Expanded Field – on recent Approaches in Interdisciplinary Composition", which is based on a lecture he gave at the Darmstadt Summer Courses in 2016.

=== Game-based compositions ===
In 2015, Ciciliani has been granted a PEEK project by the Austrian Science Fund with the title "GAPPP – Gamified Audiovisual Performance and Performance Practice" (AR 364). It was an artistic research project that ran from 2016-21, and in which together with violinist and researcher Barbara Lüneburg and musicologist Andreas Pirchner, Ciciliani investigated elements from computer games in the context of audiovisual composition and performance for their aesthetic potential. With this project Ciciliani deepened his interest in either overtly referencing game culture - as in his composition "Kilgore" - or integrating competitive and/or interactive elements from computer games in subtle ways - as in the project "Tympanic Touch". The interest for computer game elements can be found in his work since "Homo Ludens", composed in 2013 for the Ensemble des XX. Jahrhunderts. Through the work with game-elements he is returning to principles of composition that he already thoroughly explored in his numerous open form compositions from the early 2000.

The research concluded with the publication of the multimedia book "LUDIFIED", which includes a USB-stick with more than four hours of video-material, and downloadable apps for the experience of augmented reality with certain images in the book. It has been published by TheGreenBox in Berlin.

=== Transmedia composition ===
Still as part of the research project GAPPP, Ciciliani composed "Anna & Marie", a work for electric violin and baroque violin, generative electronics, two projected interactive 3D environments and lighting. It was a performative installation commissioned by the Donaueschinger Musiktage and performed by Barbara Lüneburg and Susanne Scholz. In this work performances take place in an installation environment, which otherwise offers the audience multiple ways to interact with the work. The exploration of the artistic quality of such different points-of-access became a key concern in his transmedia compositions that form the center of his works in the 2020s.

In his approach, in transmedia composition, an art project encompasses several artworks, each using a distinct combination of media. Each individual part of a transmedia work can stand on its own, yet the different parts offer various perspectives on a shared conceptual field.

From 2020-2022 he composed "Why Frets?" a series of three works – a multimedia performance, a performance lecture, and an installation – that illuminate different aspects of this fictional history of the electric guitar from varying angles. The story is based on speculative fabulation – a deliberate re-invention of the past and it is the first in a series of multi-part projects that focus on transmedia as a musical format. The project comprises three principal components: a multimedia concert (Why Frets? - Downtown 1983), an installation (Why Frets? - Tombstone), and a lecture-performance (Why Frets? - Requiem for the Electric Guitar)."Why Frets?" has been published in the form of a book with an integrated USB stick by Mille Plateaux and Galerie der Abseitigen Künste. This book, however, is not merely a documentation of the project but it further extends it and can be considered a fourth part. A fifth part is an online experience accessible via QR code (Why Frets? - Necromancy). "Why Frets?" was performed by Ciciliani more than a dozen times across Europe.

His most recent transmedia work is "BAROGUE". Premiered at the ORF-Musikprotokoll in October 2025, it is a three-part transmedia project: a 50-minute string quartet with live electronics and four video projections ("BAROGUE - Absolute Plunder"), an audiovisual installation ("BAROGUE - Roccoco Carnage") and a performance for an audience of four ("BAROGUE - Zero to Circle") each open up their own perspectives on models of thought from the 18th century, whose influences continue to have an impact today. In this project, the Baroque era - described by Kant as the "exit of man from his self-inflicted immaturity" - is regarded as an era of high culture, but also characterized by profound contradictions: While systems of order and standardization were introduced in the sciences with methodical rigour, and while independent thinking detached from religion created a new ethical consciousness, the world was divided up among colonial powers, indigenous peoples were subjugated and newly discovered territories were plundered. According to Ciciliani, the Baroque style reflects this ambivalence: the urge for order but also for playful ornamentation, for discipline and excess. These contrasts can also be found in the aesthetic language of BAROGUE, which is characterized by eclectic opulence as well as formal austerity.

== Performances, Residencies and Teaching activities ==
Ciciliani's music has been performed in more than 45 countries in Europe, Asia, Oceania and the Americas. It has been programmed by festivals and concert series of alternative experimental music like Experimental Intermedia/NYC, Club Transmediale/Berlin, SuperDeluxe/Tokyo, Findars/Kuala Lumpur, Ibrasotope/São Paulo or the NowNow Series/Sydney; just as much as by festivals for post-avantgarde music as Donaueschinger Musiktage, Wien Modern, Huddersfield Contemporary Music Festival, MaerzMusik, Condit and many more.

His music has been performed by high ranking ensembles like ICTUS ensemble, ensemble Intégrales, ASKO, Zeitkratzer, piano possible and many more. In his recent work, however, Ciciliani has focused on works for smaller settings, solo works and works for live-electronics alone. He also regularly performs with a repertoire of audiovisual solo compositions.

In 2009 Marko Ciciliani was recipient of the prestigious Villa Aurora Stipend, a three-month artists residency in Los Angeles. Also in 2009 he was composer-in-residence of the 14th Composers Forum in Mittersill/Austria. He received numerous project-residencies at STEIM, ESS, ICST and ZKM. In 2014 Ciciliani has taught at the Darmstadt International Summer Courses for New Music where he also presented a portrait concert. This invitation took place as part of the IEM's studio residency at the Summer Courses. In 2016 he has also been invited individually as teacher to the Darmstadt International Summer Courses for New Music, where he offered individual lessons and a.o. a workshop on audiovisual composition, titled "Music in the Expanded Field". He returned to Darmstadt as tutor in 2018.

Since 2013 Ciciliani has regularly participated at the interdisciplinary course LAbO in Antwerp, which is organized by ChampDAction He was Artistic Director of this summer course in the seasons 2017, 2020 and 2021.

== Research ==
Ciciliani has various publications in the field of performance studies and audiovisuality. He has developed a method for the analysis of performance practices in electronic music. Here performance is understood as an audiovisual event which becomes part of the presented work and therefore gains aesthetic relevance. With this method the analysis of a particular performance practice results in a graph on a parametric field, which facilitates the comparison of different performance practices with each other.

To regard performance as an audiovisual event is in line with Ciciliani's longer lasting research in the field of audiovisuality which has resulted in his dissertation and other publications.

Many publications have resulted from the artistic research project "GAPPP – Gamified Audiovisual Performance and Performance Practice" (AR 364) that Ciciliani is leading since 2016.

== Selected works ==
- miris misli for large orchestra 1994 ~ 20'
- Starring: Peater Mallet for three percussionists 1994/95 ~ 40'
- k: die S.kalierung einer Bewegung – Tek...kno for singer/narrator and live-electronics 1995 ~ 11’
- Bosch tapped the gas pedal and the caprice moved forward... for two performers and live-electronics (collaboration with Jeff Kowalkowski) 1996–2000 ~70’
- Tullius Rooms for piano, live-electronics and soundscapes 1999/2000 ~80'
- Fabric Reverie for chamber orchestra, CD and a reciting conductor 2000 ~15'
- Homerun for alto and 8 instruments (rec., cl., trb., pno., perc., el.-guit., vln., db.), 5 movements 2001 20'
- Matrosen, Leprakranke, Opiumraucher, Spione. Mit so 'ner Familiengeschichte, wie haben wir da was anderes werden können als Schlampen? for viola 2001 20'
- Maske for no-input mixer 2002 ~30’
- KörperKlang for viola, alto-sax, piano and live-electronics 2003 ~13’
- Just because you're not paranoid doesn't mean that they're not after you for solo-violin, large ensemble, live-electronics and light 2003 ~15’
- Sequenced Seizure for string quartet ~30' 2004
- Map of Marble for voice, percussion, live-electronics and computer generated lighting ~80' 2004/2005
- My Ultadeep I for e-guitar, e-bass, vln/vla, sopranino sax, didjeridu, perc., electronics and light ~65' 2006/2007
- Alias for e-violin, electronics, light and laser ~20' 2007
- Jeanne of the Dark for electric guitar/bass, electric vln., perc., live-electronics, video and lighting ~60’ 2008
- Dromomania for two pianos, live-electronics, soundtracks and lighting ~40’ 2009
- Black Horizon for two table-top guitars and four players ~21’ 2009
- All of Yesterday’s Parties for voice, electric guitar and live-electronics ~12’ 2010
- Pop Wall Alphabet for soundtracks ~4 hours and 30 minutes 2011–14
- Heterotopolis for violin, baritone guitar/6-string fretless bass, modular synthesizer, digital synthesis, live-electronics, lighting and laser (collaboration with visual artist Marcel Bühler) ~55’ 2011/12
- Time Machine for sensor-equipped bass-clarinet (SABRe), live-electronics, live-video and lighting 16' 2012/13
- LipsEarsAssNoseBoobs (Gloomy Sunday) for electric violin, percussion, keyboards, live-electronics and video ~14’ 2014
- Formula minus One for electric violin, live-electronics and live video ~10' 2014
- Via for live-electronics and live-video ~14’ 2015
- Steina for violin, live-electronics and live-generated video and laser design ~28’ 2015
- Audiodromo for four percussionists, live-electronics and live-video ~10’ 2016
- Tympanic Touch for two performers and a game-system 15' 2017
- Kilgore for two performers and a game-system 25' 2018
- Kilgore's Resort installation 2018
- Anna & Marie concert installation, electric violin, baroque violin, live-electronics, two live-videos, augmented reality and light-design, indeterminate duration 2018/19
- Rave Séance performance installation, indeterminate duration 2020
- Why Frets? transmedia project of three principal parts: an audiovisual concert, a performance-lecture and an audiovisual installation 2022
- SkylAR five posters providing access to a series of interactive audiovisual compositions using Augmented Reality,

and an intermedia event for two performers with triple projection, live-streaming and live-electronics (50 minutes) 2023

- BAROGUE transmedia project of three parts: a 50 minute string quartet with 4 video projections and live-electronics, an audiovisual installation and a solo-performance for an audience of four persons 2025

== CD, DVD and book releases ==
=== Full Releases ===
- Bosch tapped the gas pedal and the Caprice moved forward… (62:28), 2001, collaboration with Jeff Kowalkowski, released by NoHarmDone/NYC
- Tullius Rooms for piano, electronics and soundscapes (78:27), 2003, piano: Josh Dillon, electronics and inside piano: Marko Ciciliani, released by Unsounds/Amsterdam in coproduction with RadioBremen
- Voor het hooren geboren (71:24), 2006, five chamber-musical works performed by ensemble Intégrales, released by Coviello Classics/Darmstadt
- 81 Matters in elemental Order (58:46), 2008, for no-input mixer, released by Evil Rabbit Records/Amsterdam
- Jeanne of the Dark (49:21), 2011, for electric violin, electric guitar, electric bass, keyboards, electronics and percussion, released by Ahornfelder/Hamburg
- Pop Wall Alphabet (approx. 270'), 2015, a book containing a DVD, 311 pages with 27 color images, private print for promotion only
- Transgressions (approx. 67'), 2019, a book with integrated USB stick containing audiovisual works, 72 pages, released by ChampDAction/Antwerp
- LUDIFIED (approx. 120'), 2021, multimedia book with integrated USB stick containing audiovisual works, 248 pages, released by TheGreenBox/Berlin
- Why Frets? (approx. 75'), 2023, a book with integrated USB stick, 64 pages, released by Mille Plateaux/Frankfurt a.M. and Galerie der Abseitigen Künste/Hamburg

=== Compilations ===
- Kraakgeluiden/Document 1 (2003) released by Unsounds/Amsterdam, contains improvisation with Yannis Kyriakides, Lucio Capece and Yoshio Machida (9:57)
- Music for Baby (2004) released by Amorfon/Tokyo, contains Pavillion[sic] for string ensemble (5:12)
- Young European Generation (2005) released by Zeitklang/Berlin, contains KörperKlang for viola, alto sax, piano and live electronics (12:13) ensemble Intégrales
- Jorge Isaac Solo (2007)released by Electroshock Recordings, Moscow, contains Quartz Stalagnat for recorder and electronics (18:15) performed by Jorge Isaac
- Test Tone Anthology (2009) released by: Medama Records, Tokyo, contains improvisation with Yoshio Machida (7:12)
- Kofomi #14 (2010), released by ein–klang records, Vienna, contains Zwischenraumstudie for flute, clarinet, viola and cello (5:34)
- Anthology of Dutch Musik (2011) released by MuziekCentrum NL, Amsterdam, contains an excerpt from the 80 minute composition Map of Marble (6:39)
- Weapon of Choice (2011) released by Ahornfelder, Hamburg, DVD, contains Alias for electric violin, live-electronics, lighting and laser (20:41) performed by Barbara Lüneburg
- Etude Gone Badum (2013) released by Ahornfelder, Hamburg, contains Black Horizon for two table-top guitars and four players (21:32) played by Håkon Stene and Marko Ciciliani
- Reciprocity – Nico Couck (2013) released by Champ d'Action, Antwerp, contains All of Yesterday's Parties for voice, electric guitar and live electronics (12:27) played by Nico Couck
- Palavras e Sons (2015) released by NMElindo, São Paulo, contains Dromomania (job of dying's done) for electronics (9:34)
