= North American Time Capsule =

North American Time Capsule is a 1967 composition by American experimental composer Alvin Lucier. The piece was composed at the invitation of Sylvania Applied Research Laboratories, which offered Lucier the use of a prototype vocoder. The vocal content of the piece was provided by the Brandeis University Chamber Chorus, of which Lucier was then the director. The score calls for members of the Chorus to “prepare a plan of activity using speech, singing, musical instruments, or any other sound producing means that might describe—to beings very far from the earth’s environment either in space or in time—the physical, social, spiritual, or any other situation in which we find ourselves at the present time.” Along with Sylvania engineer Calvin Howard, Lucier used the vocoder to isolate and manipulate elements of speech in real time. Eight separate tracks were recorded and subsequently mixed by Lucier. The piece is available on Vespers and Other Early Works (New World Records).
