= Boreas (film) =

- Theatrical release poster
- Directed by: Belma Baş
- Written by: Belma Baş
- Produced by: Seyhan Kaya; Budak Akalın
- Starring: Şeyma Uzunlar; Sevinç Baş; O. Rüştü Baş; Oktay Kaptan; Müjgan Öztürk
- Cinematography: Mehmet Zengin
- Edited by: Berke Baş
- Music by: Erdem Helvacıoğlu
- Production company: FiLMiK Produksiyon
- Release date: 26 May 2006 (Cannes)
- Running time: 13 minutes
- Country: Turkey
- Language: Turkish

Boreas (Turkish: Poyraz) is a 2006 Turkish short drama film, written and directed by Belma Baş, in which a child observes the rustic life of her elderly relatives in a remote old house in the mountains. The film was premiered in competition at the 59th Cannes Film Festival and was shown at the 43rd Antalya Golden Orange Film Festival, where it won the Special Jury Prize. It was the basis for the director's feature debut Zephyr (2010).
