= Richenthal, Lucerne =

Former municipality, canton of Lucerne

Richenthal
- Former municipality
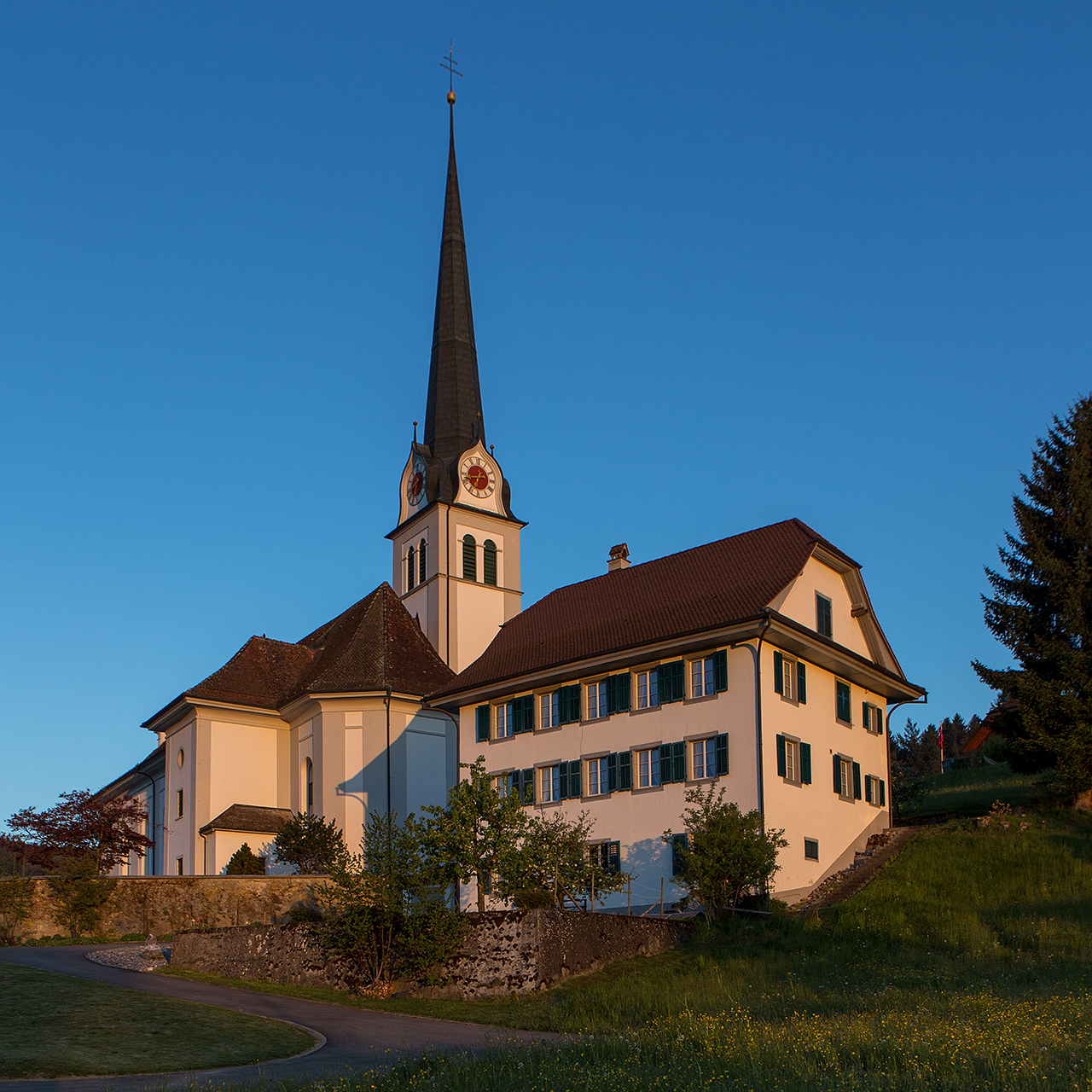
- Church of Saint Cecilia
- Location of Richenthal
- Location within Switzerland Location within Canton of Lucerne
- Coordinates: 47°13′2″N 7°56′38″E
- Country: Switzerland
- Canton: Lucerne
- District: Willisau
- Municipality: Reiden

Population (2000)
  - Total: 662
- Time zone: UTC+01:00 (CET)
  - Summer (DST): UTC+02:00 (CEST)
- SFOS number: 1141
- ISO 3166 code: CH-LU
- Website: Profile (in German),

Richenthal is a former municipality in the Willisau district of the canton of Lucerne, Switzerland. Since 2006 it has been part of the municipality of Reiden, together with Langnau bei Reiden. It is an elongated settlement in a side valley of the Wigger valley, with the hamlet of Hueb and scattered farms in the hills.

== History ==
Richenthal is first mentioned in 1036 as Richentale (in a 14th-century copy) and in 1173 as ecclesia richendal. Together with Langnau bei Reiden and Mehlsecken, it belonged to the Langnau quarter (Langnauer Viertel) of the manorial lordship of the chapter of canons of Beromünster. The Lenzburgs gave the church, dedicated to Saint Cecilia, to the chapter before 1036, and it was incorporated into the chapter in 1346. The church was rebuilt in 1803–1807 and renovated in 1951 and 1973, and a new organ was installed in 2007. Until the parish of Langnau was created in 1948, the parish of Richenthal also included the upper part of the village of Langnau.

Politically, Richenthal was part of the tax district (Steuerbrief) of Langnau until 1844, and it became an independent municipality in 1846. The Blum Kneipp spa (Kneippkuranstalt), now the Park-Hotel Richenthal, opened in 1899. The Huebbach was regulated in 1922. Richenthal is not a village that grew out of the compulsory field system (Flurzwang); only recently, as its separate parts have grown together, has it taken on features of a street village. Agriculture plays a declining but still large role (in 2005, 51% of those employed worked in the primary sector), while the number of residents who commute to work elsewhere is rising.

Richenthal had about 340 inhabitants in 1695, 396 in 1798, 513 in 1850, 484 in 1900, 581 in 1950 and 662 in 2000.

== Bibliography ==
- Die Kunstdenkmäler des Kantons Luzern, vol. 5, 1959, pp. 196–202
- M. Huber, Langnau im Wiggertal, 1996
