= Erdem Helvacıoğlu =

Turkish electronic musician (born 1975)

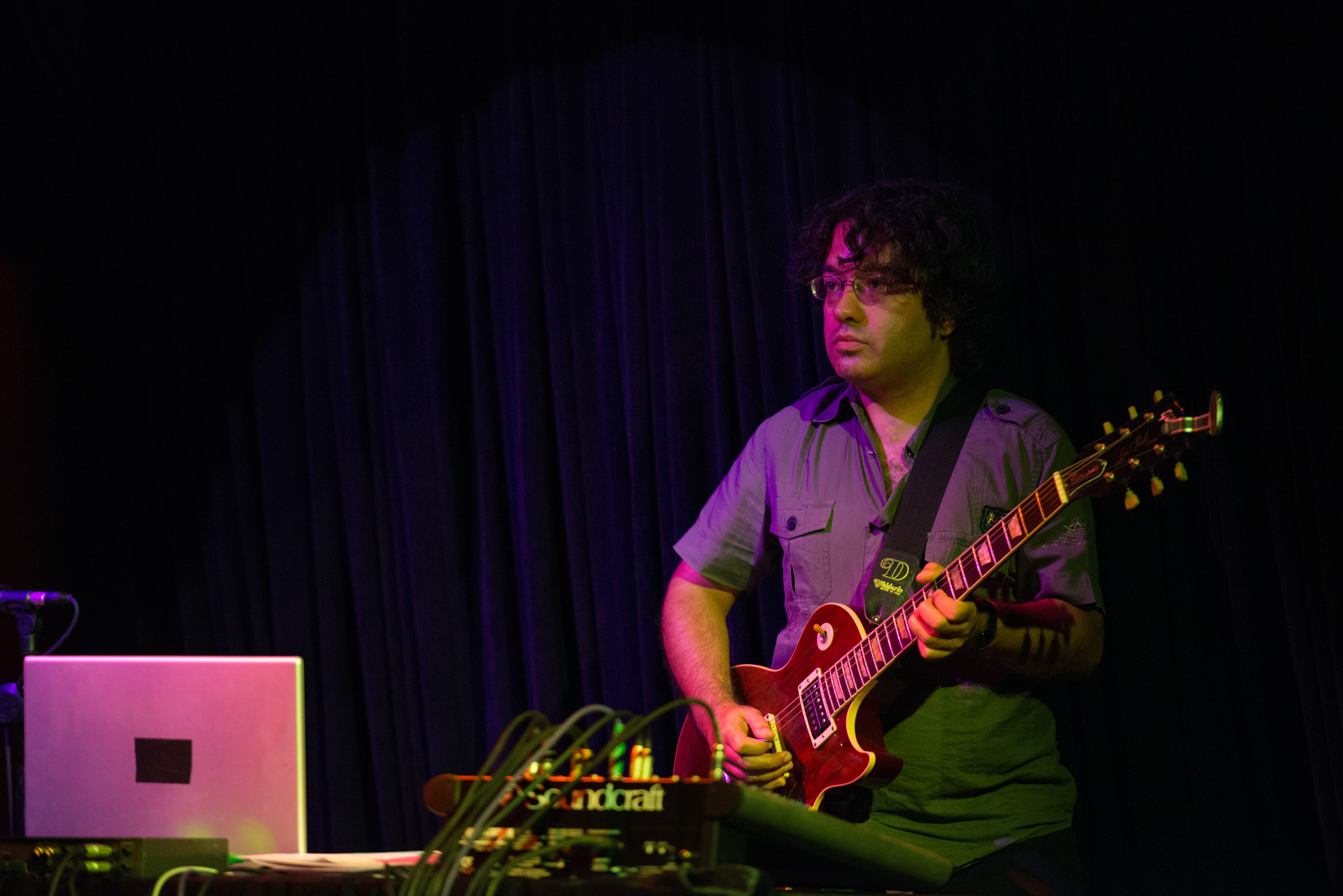

Background information
- Born: 22 May 1975 (age 50)
- Origin: Bursa, Turkey
- Genres: Electronic, Jazz, Ambient
- Years active: 2000–present
- Website: Official site

Erdem Helvacioglu (born 22 May 1975 in Bursa, Turkey) is an electronic musician from Turkey. He has collaborated with artists Mick Karn, Kevin Moore, John Wilson, Kazuya Ishigami, and Saadet Turkoz. He also composes music for theatre, film and multimedia productions, and produces for popular and rock music bands in Turkey. He has received numerous international awards including prizes from the Luigi Russolo and Insulae Electronicae Electroacoustic Music Competitions.

== Career ==
The first commercial release to feature Erdem's music was the self-titled debut album by symphonic rock band Too Much. Erdem was a founding member, guitar player and songwriter for Too Much. The album was recorded and released into the underground music scene in Istanbul in 1993, while Erdem was still in high school.

Erdem began composing electronic music pieces while he was studying electroacoustic music composition and sound engineering at Istanbul Technical University. His work became noted in international electronic music circles and in time his compositions have been included in several prestigious electronic music festivals such as the San Francisco Tape Music Festival, Sonorities Festival of Contemporary Music, Seoul International Computer Music Festival, Musica Viva Festival, Primavera en La Habana and Third Practice Electroacoustic Music Festival. Erdem also won awards for his compositions from the Luigi Russolo, Insulae Electronicae and MUSICA NOVA Electroacoustic Music Competitions.

As an electronic music artist, Erdem released his first album in 2003. The album, entitled A Walk Through The Bazaar was released by Locust Music as part of the MetLife series. The album opens with a field recording of an open-air marketplace in Istanbul, capturing the everyday sounds in the bazaar, including street vendors, market customers, cell phones, children and traditional music played in the background. The second and final track of the album features a remix of the field recording with some electronic effects. The album achieved critical acclaim from esteemed music publications, including The Wire magazine, Splendid, Pitchforkmedia and Allmusic.

Erdem's second album was Altered Realities, released by New Albion Records in 2006. His first album to receive wide release, Altered Realities consists of seven instrumental pieces, combining solo acoustic guitar melodies and live electronics. Altered Realities was well received in electronic music circles, with its live recording technique featured in music publications, including Guitar Player (August 2007), Gramaphone, Tapeop, World1 Music, Cyclic Defrost, and Cuemix magazines. The album has made the Top Ten lists of three international magazines: All About Jazz, Textura, and Cyclic Defrost, as one of the Best of 2007. The distinctive album forges a unique blend of classical, ambient, jazz, folk genres, and electroacoustic styles. Erdem recorded all of the compositions on the album in real-time, directly to DAT (Digital Audio Tape) without any overdubs, mixing, editing, post-processing, or the use of previously recorded material. All of the textures were created by the acoustic guitar played live and the signal of which was processed live. Erdem cites electric guitar players such as David Torn and Adrian Belew, Michael Hedges's the acoustic style, Harold Budd and Morton Feldman as specific influences for Altered Realities.

Erdem's third album Wounded Breath was released in USA by Aucourant Records in December 2008. The album includes 5 of his prizewinning electroacoustic pieces which he had performed at prestigious contemporary festivals all around the world along with composers such as Paul Lansky and Morton Subotnick. In 2008, Erdem was commissioned by Bang On A Can-All Stars, one of the most well known New Music Ensembles, to compose a piece, which premiered at Merkin Hall, New York on 13 February 2008.

Additionally, his compositions have been included on various labels like chmafu nocords, vox novus, quiet American, and OAR for various compilation albums, such as "ctrl-alt-del", which also included works by Scanner, Kim Cascone and Merzbow.

He has released the album Sub City 2064 with Per Boysen, in Sweden. This work has been included in the “Best 20 albums of 2010” list on Blogcritics and Perfect Sound Forever magazines. The album has also been on the “Guitar Player Editors’ Top 3 CDs" list on the October 2010 issue. Helvacioglu has released the duo album Black Falcon with the Australian sound artist Ros Bandt in December 2010. This album has been included in the “Best albums of 2011” list" in the Blogcritics magazine. He has also released another duo album Resonating Universes in August 2011, this time with the Turkish harpist Sirin Pancaroglu. His solo sound installation exhibition “Freedom to the Black” has been premiered at ARTER in February 2012 and a book with the same title which includes the CD of the piece has been published. His album Eleven Short Stories which consists of his solo prepared piano pieces has been released by the American label Innova Records in March 2012. His solo album Timeless Waves has been released in April 2012 by the prestigious contemporary electronic music label Sub Rosa Records. Other albums of him that have been released in 2012 are Erlik Khan (with Bruce Tovsky), Planet X (with Ulrich Mertin) and Fields and Fences (with Bill Walker) celebrating the American rural west which was featured with a long article in the Guitar Player magazine 2012 Holiday issue.

He has composed music for various film, theatre and multimedia productions. He has received "The Best Original Soundtrack" award at the 2007 Mostramundo Film Festival for his work on the movie Poyraz which was chosen for the 2006 Cannes Film Festival.

Outside of his work as an electronic musician and film composer, Erdem has also produced rock, pop and world music albums for artists such as Rashit, Timucin Esen, Mehmet Akbas etc.

Currently, Erdem is working on the new collaborative album with Nathan Larson, Nina Persson and also his new solo pieces.

== Discography ==
- A Walk Through the Bazaar (Locustmusic, 2003)
- Altered Realities (New Albion, 2006)
- Wounded Breath (Aucourant, 2008)
- Spectra: Guitar in the 21st Century (Quiet Design, 2009)
- Sub City 2064 with Per Boysen (self-release, 2010)
- Black Falcon with Ros Bandt (Pozitif Muzik, 2010)
- Resonating Universes with Sirin Pancaroglu (Sargasso Records, 2011)
- Freedom to the Black (ARTER, 2012)
- Timeless Waves (Sub Rosa, 2012)
- Eleven Short Stories (Innova, 2012)
- Erlik Khan with Bruce Tovsky (Periphery, 2012)
- Planet X with Ulrich Mertin (Innova, 2012)
- Fields and Fences with Bill Walker (Far East West, 2012)
- Esther's Memory with Stuart Gerber (Aucourant, 2013)
- Eleven Short Stories Volume 2 (Innova, 2013)
