= Hauke Harder =

German composer (born 1963)

- Born: Heide, Germany
- Occupation: composer

Hauke Harder (born 1963 in Heide (Holstein), Germany) is a German composer and experimental physicist.

== Life ==
Harder received a PhD in chemistry, and works at the Institute for Physical Chemistry, Department of Chemistry and Physics, University of Kiel, Kiel, Germany.

In 1989, he studied with Wolfgang von Schweinitz, a New Simplicity composer.

He is the founder, (with Rainer Grodnick) of the "Gesellschaft für Akustische Lebenshilfe", (Society for Musical Living Assistance), Kiel, Germany. Since 1995, he has worked as an assistant to composer Alvin Lucier and is associated with the Material group of composers, along with Daniel James Wolf, and Markus Trunk. His compositional work is in an extreme minimal style, and is connected to the work of the composers Morton Feldman, Walter Zimmermann, and Alvin Lucier. His music has also been influenced by Monochrome Painting and the films of Robert Bresson.

His work in sound installation, exhibitions and concerts include: the International New Music Festival Rümlingen, Switzerland, Evenings of New Music Bratislava, Flanders Music Festival Antwerp, Nové Expozice hudby Brno.

== Awards ==
In 2001 he received a "Kulturnetz-Preis", and 3,000 Mark, by Schleswig-Holstein's culture minister Ute Erdsiek-Rave.

== Works ==
His works as a scientist in the field of molecular spectroscopy have been featured in:

- Hauke Harder; Helmut Dreizler; Duan Papouek (September 1995). "The direct l -type resonance spectrum of CF 35 3 Cl in its vibrational state v 6 = 1". Molecular Physics. 86 (1): 107–124. Bibcode:1995MolPh..86..107H. doi:10.1080/00268979500101871.
- Carsten Gerke; Hauke Harder (14 June 1996). "Direct l-type doubling transitions in the ν6 = 1 vibrational state of CF3Br and CF3I: l-type resonance effects on the spin-rotation coupling". Chemical Physics Letters. 255 (4–6): 287–294. Bibcode:1996CPL...255..287G. doi:10.1016/0009-2614(96)00399-5.,
- Macholl, Sven; Mäder, Heinrich; Harder, Hauke; Margulès, Laurent; Dréan, Pascal; Cosléou, Jean; Demaison, Jean; Pracna, Petr (5 January 2009). "Rotational Spectrum of NSF3 in the Ground and v5 = 1 Vibrational States: Observation of Q-Branch Perturbation-Allowed Transitions with Δ(k − l) = 0, ±3, ±6 and Anomalies in the Rovibrational Structure of the v5 = 1 State". The Journal of Physical Chemistry A. 113 (4). American Chemical Society (ACS): 668–679. Bibcode:2009JPCA..113..668M. doi:10.1021/jp807342f. ISSN 1089-5639. PMID 19123852.
- Ulf Wötzel; Hauke Harder; Heinrich Mäder; Luciano Fusina (March 2005). "Hyperfine structure of rotational transitions of 14NF3 in the v4 = 1 vibrational state". Journal of Molecular Spectroscopy. 230 (1): 99–101. Bibcode:2005JMoSp.230...99W. doi:10.1016/j.jms.2004.10.003.
- Harder, H. (1993). Untersuchungen an symmetrischen Kreiselmolekülen mittels ein- und zweidimensionaler Fouriertransform-Spektroskopie im Radiofrequenz- und Mikrowellenbereich (in German).

== Performances ==
Hildegard Kleeb has premiered his work. On 14 April 2009, his piece in honor of Walter Zimmermann was played in concert by Heather O'Donnell. He is in the Czech New Music Group MoEns' repertoire. Roland Dahinden has premiered his work. On 26 April 2008, Trio Nexus played his work at festival blurred edges, Hamburg.

== Selected exhibitions and installations ==
- Beat in Flensburg (1994)
- punto e basta in Kiel (1996, with Stephan Ullmann)
- SAMMER. HEINRICH, FREUND in Dresden (1998)
- escale 17: extradry in Düsseldorf (1999, with Stephan Ullmann)
- Kabinett für Klanggegenwart Hauke Harder: 7:6 für Metallbleche, Sinusgeneratoren, Verstärker und Transducer in Kiel (2002/2003)
- XVII. Exposizione nové hudby in Brno (2004)
- Klangraum Flensburg in Flensburg (2007)
- BEAT IT in Berlin (2008)
- The long thin wire in Alpbach (2008, with Alvin Lucier)
- farb_laut in Berlin (2008)
- "Winter in Octaves". 2007.

== Criticism ==
Hauke Harder is both a composer and physicist, Blake and Newton in one person, if you will. This fact is something that Harder has always presented as essentially accidental. This fact has sometimes made composers and musicians a bit nervous, suspicious of the program behind his programs. A large part of this nervousness is surely just the anxiety most citizens feel about science: they do not understand it but believe it to be true. This is just a modern substitute of the fear of God felt by all of our ancestors. In truth, though, Harder’s vision should rather make physicists nervous: his is an assertion that the aesthetic, with qualities incomprehensible to the rational eye and ear, also has a part, indeed the vital part, in the life of the mind.

- Knut Nieves, Wolfgang von Schweinitz (1996). Punto e Basta: Hauke Harder / Stephan Ullmann. Kiel: Kulturamt d. Landeshauptstadt Kiel; Stadtgalerie im Sophienhof. ISBN 978-3-927979-43-7.
