= Clocker (composition) =

Electronic music piece by Alvin Lucier

Clocker, for clock, galvanic skin response sensor and digital delay system, is a minimalist electronic music piece by Alvin Lucier conceived in 1978, though Lucier felt there did not exist an appropriate digital delay system till 1988: "With this new equipment, the sounds of the delayed clock now matched those of the original, creating clear copies and with them a more convincing illusion of time expanding and contracting. Later I added a bank of fixed delays which, as they splay out from the voltage controlled delay, create multiple reflections that almost convince the listener that the room is changing size."

What was played through the digital delay system, a Digitech RDS 7.6 with a continuously variable voltage control output, was the sounds of a clock, a Westclox Silver Bell Monogram, ticking, with the delay controlled by a galvanic skin response sensor (GSR). The GSR, by sending a small current through the body, reads minute differences in skin resistance which in turn is influenced by the performers thoughts and emotions: "I had wanted to make a work in which a performer could speed up and slow down time, stopping it, if possible, simply by thinking."

The 1991 release was recorded in a stone room twenty foot square and thirty feet high. Six small loudspeakers where placed about the room aimed at various walls to create acoustic delays. Collins then routed the audio through different combinations of speakers according to a score written by Lucier, apparently for the occasion, in 1991.

Lucier notes a synchronistic event, his reading of If on a winter's night a traveler by Calvino: "What I would like most in the world...is to make clocks run backward...No, with thought, by concentrating until I force time to move back....polydyptic theatre, in which about sixty little mirrors lining the inside of a large box transform a bough into a forest, a lead soldier into an army, a booklet into a library."
