= Horní Kounice =

- Municipality
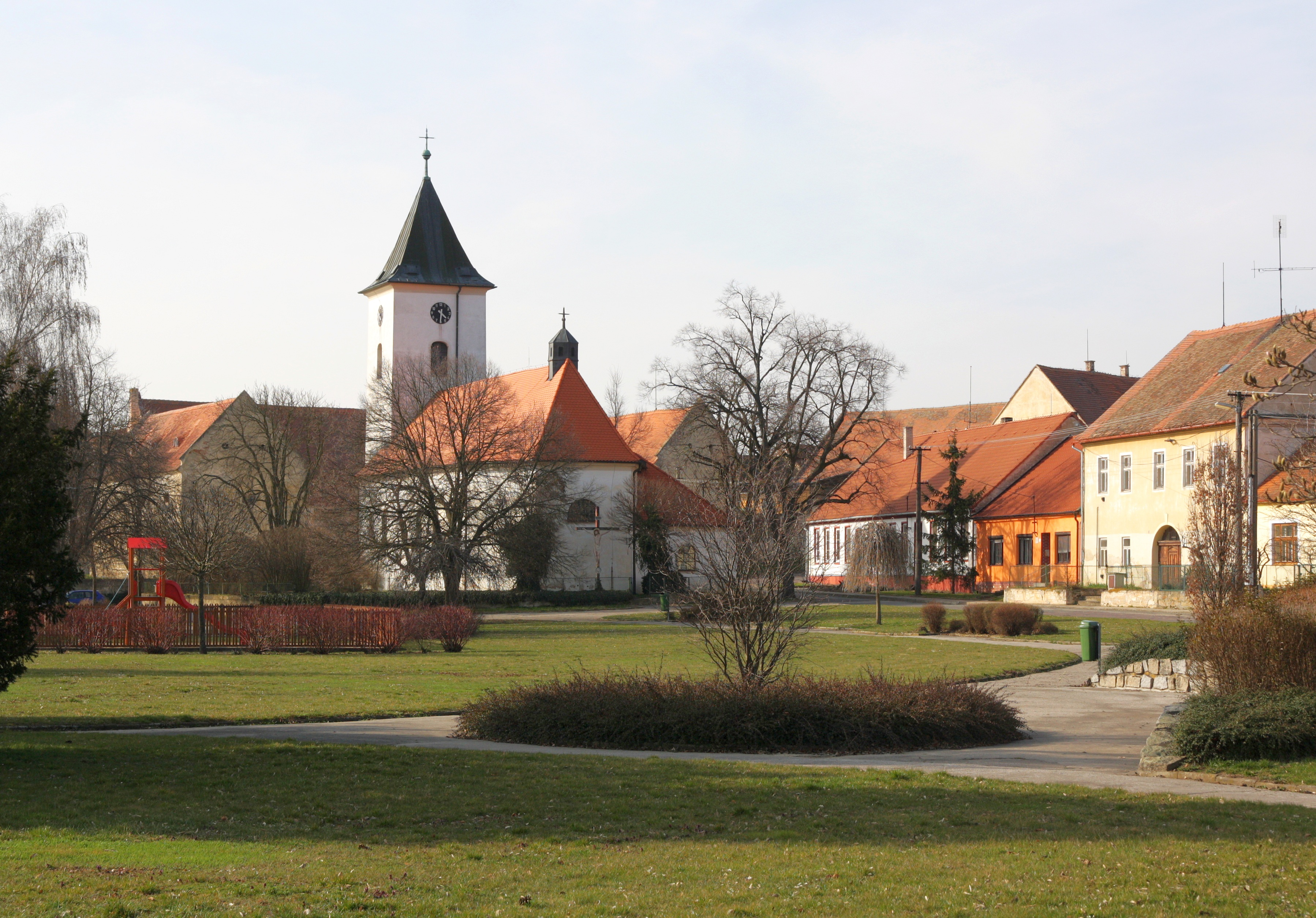
- Centre of Horní Kounice

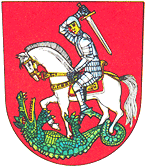
- Flag Coat of arms

- Location in the Czech Republic
- Coordinates: 49°1′34″N 16°9′8″E
- Country: Czech Republic
- Region: South Moravian
- District: Znojmo
- First mentioned: 1235

Area
  - Total: 12.37 km^{2} (4.78 sq mi)
- Elevation: 355 m (1,165 ft)

Population (2026-01-01)
  - Total: 305
  - Density: 24.7/km^{2} (63.9/sq mi)
- Time zone: UTC+1 (CET)
  - Summer (DST): UTC+2 (CEST)
- Postal code: 671 40
- Website: www.hornikounice.cz

Horní Kounice is a municipality and village in Znojmo District in the South Moravian Region of the Czech Republic. It has about 300 inhabitants.

Horní Kounice lies approximately 23 kilometres (14 mi) north-east of Znojmo, 38 km (24 mi) south-west of Brno, and 173 km (107 mi) south-east of Prague.

== Demographics ==
Historical population
Year	Pop.	±%
1869	501	—
1880	493	−1.6%
1890	495	+0.4%
1900	504	+1.8%
1910	486	−3.6%
1921	509	+4.7%
1930	491	−3.5%
1950	398	−18.9%
1961	385	−3.3%
1970	331	−14.0%
1980	300	−9.4%
1991	310	+3.3%
2001	272	−12.3%
2011	277	+1.8%
2021	285	+2.9%
Source: Censuses
