= Reiden Commandery =

Former Knights Hospitaller commandery

- Johanniterkommende Reiden
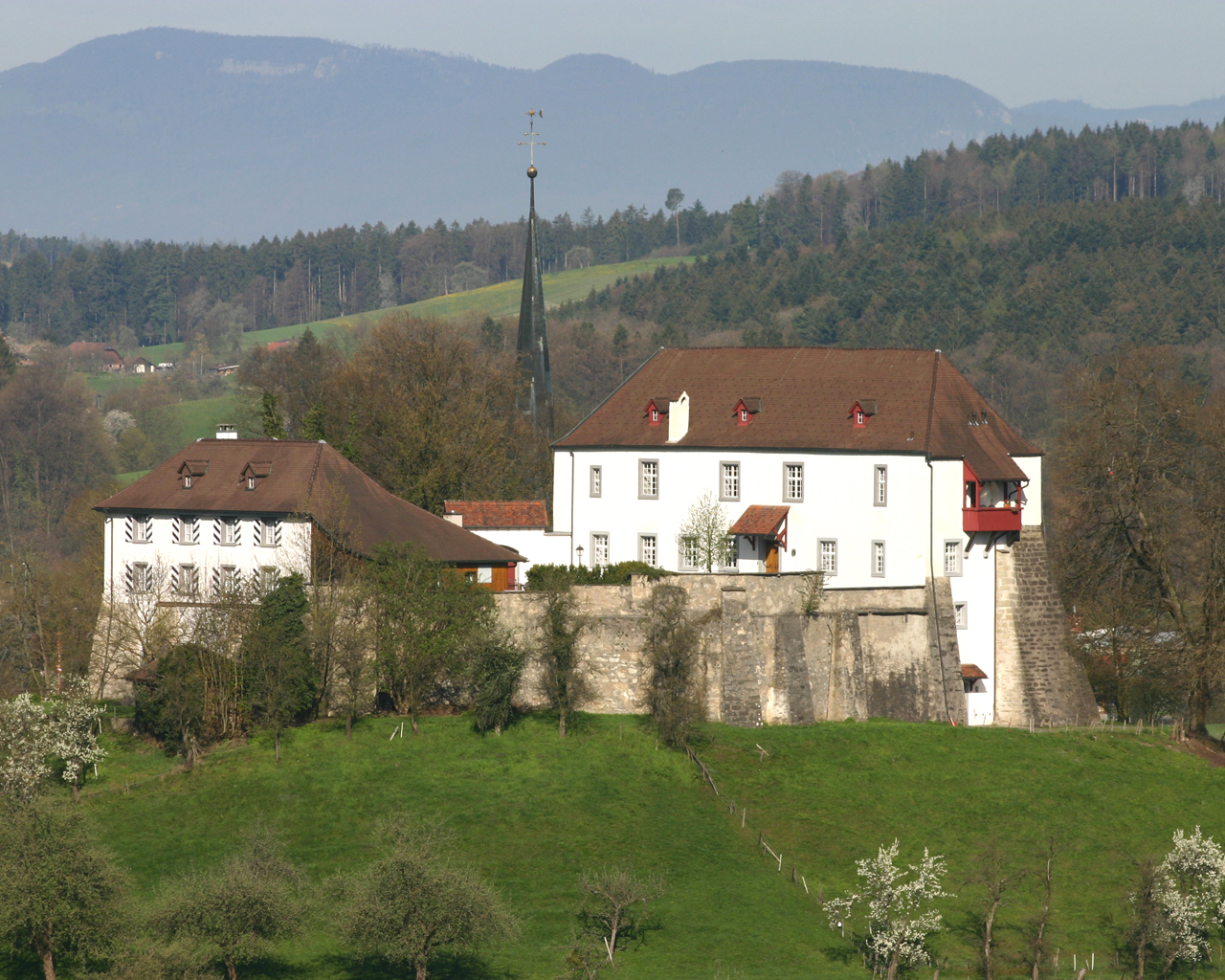
- The former commandery
- Interactive map of Reiden Commandery

Monastery information
- Order: Knights Hospitaller
- Disestablished: 1807

Site
- Location: Reiden, canton of Lucerne, Switzerland
- Coordinates: 47.24353°N 7.973434°E

Reiden Commandery (German: Johanniterkommende Reiden) was a commandery of the Knights Hospitaller in Reiden in the canton of Lucerne, Switzerland. The lords of Ifenthal probably sold their property at Reiden to the order in 1280; the first commander is mentioned in 1284. From 1472 until its dissolution in 1807 the commandery depended on that of Hohenrain. Its two buildings, renewed in 1570 and around 1700, largely preserve their medieval fabric.

== History ==
The buildings of the commandery are said to have been built over a high medieval castle associated with the knights Walter and Ulrich von Reiden, who are mentioned between 1168 and 1210, but no such castle has been found. In 1275 the old large parish of Reiden was owned by the lords of Ifenthal. The local lordship (Twing) of Reiden was already divided at that time, with Markwart von Ifenthal holding one half. In 1280 the lords of Ifenthal probably sold their property to the Order of St. John. The order had the commandery buildings, surrounded by a rampart and a ditch, erected on the raised site above the settlement; the complex included a church dedicated to John the Baptist, mentioned in 1391, with a cemetery (demolished in 1813). Extensive renovations in 1570 and around 1700 gave the complex its present appearance.

The first commander (Komtur) is mentioned in 1284. Until about 1330 Reiden depended on the commandery of Thunstetten, and from 1331 on the commander of Klingnau. From 1342 to 1440 the small commandery probably enjoyed some independence; it had its own seal. Around the middle of the 15th century it came under the commandery of Leuggern, and from 1472 until its dissolution in 1807 under that of Hohenrain.

The commandery's property was concentrated in Reiden and its neighborhood. The low-court lordship (Niedergerichtsherrschaft) of Reiden lay in the office (Amt) of Willisau, which was under Lucerne from 1407. In 1421 the city concluded a treaty with the commander that regulated the joint administration of the Twing of Reiden. Bailiffs (Vögte) who supervised the commandery on behalf of the council of Lucerne are first mentioned in 1532. The rights and duties once attached to the commandery passed from the canton of Lucerne to the Catholic parish community (Kirchgemeinde) of Reiden only in 1951.

Archaeological and dendrochronological investigations in 1985–1987 clarified the history of the commandery buildings. The two buildings largely preserve their original medieval fabric; part of the timber in the roof was felled in the winter of 1313–1314.

== Bibliography ==
- A. Aregger et al., Johanniterkommende Reiden, 1989
- Helvetia Sacra, IV/7, pp. 405–415
