= Musica Nova Prize =

The competition Musica Nova is a competition for composers of electroacoustic music, a form of classical contemporary music, held in Prague. The competition was first held in 1969 and now features two categories of entry, one for tape music and another for music including vocals and instrumentals.

Recipients include Fabio Cifariello Ciardi ('93),Jean-Claude Risset ('95), Charles L. Bestor ('96), Emil Viklický ('96), Alessandro Cipriani ('96), John Levack Drever ('96 & '97), Robert Normandeau ('98), and Marta Jiráčková ('98).
