= Alvin Lucier =

American composer (1931–2021)

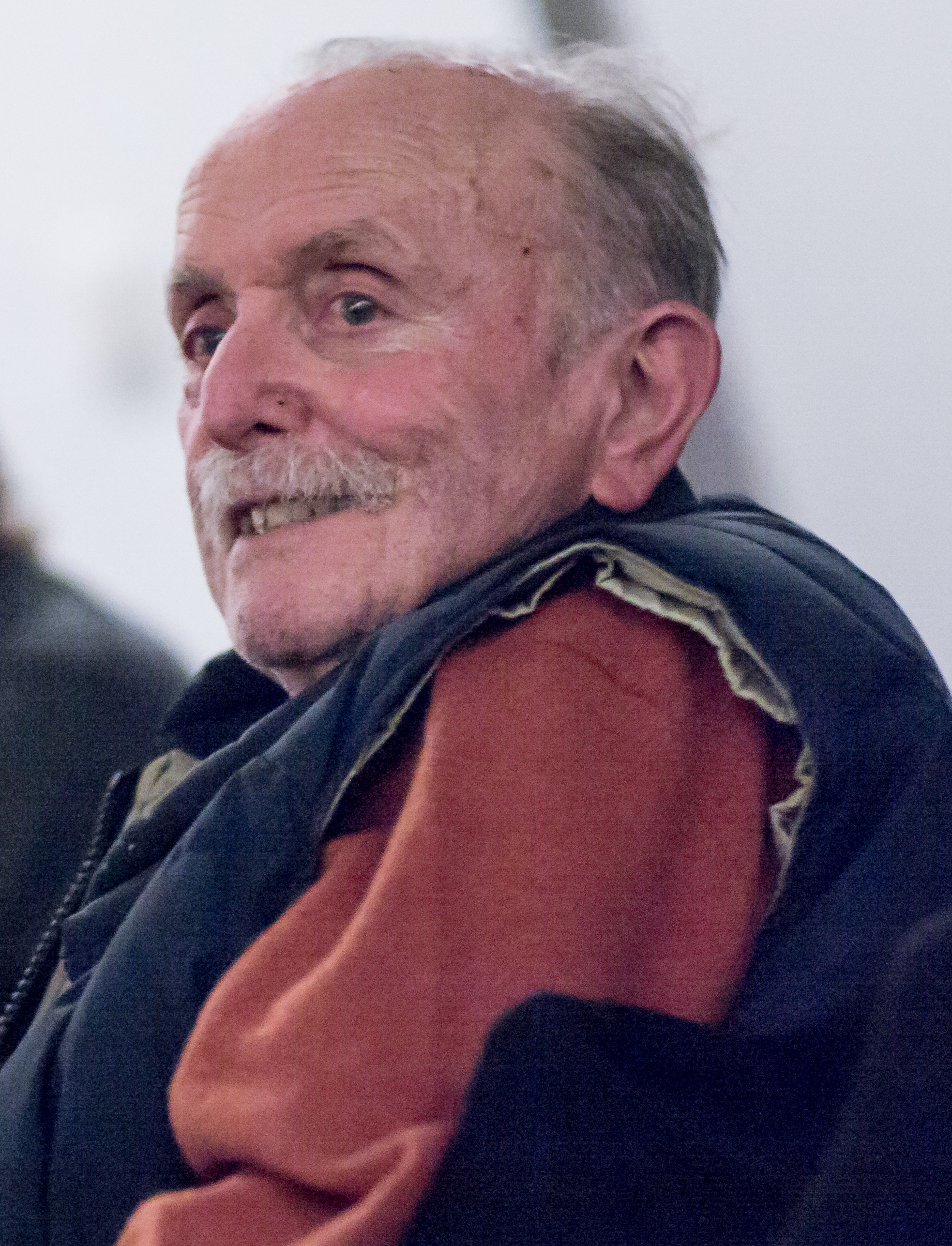
- Lucier in 2017
- Born: Alvin Augustus Lucier Jr. May 14, 1931; Nashua, New Hampshire, U.S.
- Died: December 1, 2021 (aged 90); Middletown, Connecticut, U.S.
- Education: Yale University; Brandeis University
- Known for: Sound art
- Notable work: I Am Sitting in a Room

Alvin Augustus Lucier Jr. (May 14, 1931 – December 1, 2021) was an American experimental composer and sound artist. A long-time music professor at Wesleyan University in Middletown, Connecticut, Lucier was a member of the influential Sonic Arts Union, which also included Robert Ashley, David Behrman, and Gordon Mumma. Much of Lucier's work explores psychoacoustic phenomena and the physical properties of sound.

== Early life ==
Alvin Augustus Lucier Jr. was born on May 14, 1931, in Nashua, New Hampshire, to Kathryn E. Lemery, a pianist, and Alvin Augustus Lucier Sr., a lawyer and politician who served as mayor of Nashua from 1934 to 1937. He was educated in Nashua public and parochial schools; the Portsmouth Abbey School in Portsmouth, Rhode Island; Yale University; and Brandeis University. In 1958 and 1959, Lucier studied under Lukas Foss and Aaron Copland at the Tanglewood Center. In 1960, he left for Rome on a Fulbright grant, where he befriended American expatriate composer and pianist Frederic Rzewski and witnessed performances by John Cage, Merce Cunningham, and David Tudor, who inspired him to adopt a more experimental style. He returned from Rome in 1962 to take up a position at Brandeis as director of the University Chamber Chorus, which presented classical vocal works alongside modern compositions and new commissions.

At a 1963 Chamber Chorus concert at New York's Town Hall, Lucier met Gordon Mumma and Robert Ashley, experimental composers who were also directors of the ONCE Festival. A year later, Mumma and Ashley invited the Chamber Chorus to the ONCE Festival in Ann Arbor, Michigan, and in 1966 Lucier reciprocated by inviting Mumma, Ashley, and David Behrman to Brandeis for a concert of their works. The four then embarked on a tour of the United States and Europe as the Sonic Arts Group; at Ashley's suggestion, the name was later changed to the Sonic Arts Union. After performing and touring together for a decade, the Sonic Arts Union became inactive in 1976.

In 1970, Lucier left Brandeis for Wesleyan University, where he would remain until his retirement. In 1972, Lucier became a musical director of the Viola Farber Dance Company, a position he held until 1979.

== Personal life ==
Lucier was married to his first wife, Mary, until their divorce in 1972. He then married Wendy Stokes; they had one daughter and remained together until his death.

Lucier died at his home in Middletown, Connecticut, on December 1, 2021, at age 90, from complications of a fall.

== Works ==
Though Lucier had composed chamber and orchestral works since 1952, the composer and his critics count his 1965 composition Music for Solo Performer as his first mature work.

=== I Am Sitting in a Room ===
One of Lucier's most important and best-known works is I Am Sitting in a Room (1969), in which Lucier records himself narrating a text, and then plays the recording back into the room, re-recording it. The new recording is then played back and re-recorded, and this process is repeated. Since every enclosed area has a characteristic resonance (e.g., between a large hall and a small room), the effect is that certain frequencies are gradually emphasized as they resonate in the room, until eventually the words become unintelligible, replaced by the pure resonant harmonies and tones of the room itself. The recited text describes this process in action. It begins, “I am sitting in a room, different from the one you are in now. I am recording the sound of my speaking voice…”, and concludes with “I regard this activity not so much as a demonstration of a physical fact, but more as a way to smooth out any irregularities my speech might have,” referring to his own stuttering.

=== Other works ===
Other key pieces from Lucier's oeuvre include North American Time Capsule (1966), which employed a prototype vocoder to manipulate elements of speech; Music On A Long Thin Wire (1977), in which a piano wire is strung across a room and activated by an amplified oscillator and electromagnets; Crossings (1982), in which tones play across a steadily rising sine wave to produce beat frequencies; the series Still and Moving Lines of Silence in Families of Hyperbolas (1973–74), in which beat frequencies between sine waves and acoustic instruments create "troughs" and "valleys" of sound and silence; and Clocker (1978), which uses biofeedback and a digital delay unit.

In 2025, a new musical exhibit based on cerebral organoids cultured from Lucier's white blood cells was opened at the Art Gallery of Western Australia. The cerebral organoids made from Lucier's DNA emitted electrical signals that triggered various mallets connected to brass plates, creating music. Lucier voluntarily arranged for the project so that he could continue to create music after his death.

== Awards ==
Lucier was awarded an Honorary Doctorate of Arts by the University of Plymouth in 2007.

== Discography ==
- Orchestra Works, New World Records CD 80755-2, 2013 (contains "Diamonds for 1, 2, or 3 Orchestras," "Slices," "Exploration of the House")
- Almost New York, Pogus Productions CD P21057-2, 2011 (contains "Twonings," "Almost New York," "Broken Line," "Coda Variations")
- "Silver Streetcar for the Orchestra", Sarah Hennies, on Psalms Roeba, CD #8, 2010
- Still and Moving Lines of Silence in Families of Hyperbolas, Nick Hennies, Quiet Design CD Alas011, 2010
- Still and Moving Lines of Silence in Families of Hyperbolas, 1-12, Lovely Music, Ltd. CD 1015, 2004
- Navigations for Strings; Small Waves, Mode Records, CD 124, 2003
- Still Lives, Lovely Music, Ltd. CD 5012, 2001 (contains "Music for Piano with Slow Sweep Pure Wave Oscillators," "On the carpet of leaves illuminated by the moon," "Still Lives")
- "Music On A Long Thin Wire" [excerpt] on OHM: The Early Gurus of Electronic Music, 2000. 3CD.
- Theme, Lovely Music, Ltd. CD 5011, 1999 (contains "Music for Piano with Magnetic Strings," "Theme ," " Music for Gamelan Instruments, Microphones, Amplifiers and Loudspeakers")
- Panorama, Lovely Music, Ltd. CD 1012, 1997 (contains "Wind Shadows," "Music for Piano with One or More Snare Drums," "Music for Piano with Amplified Sonorous Vessels," "Panorama ")
- Fragments for Strings, Arditti String Quartet, Disques Montaigne, 1996
- Clocker, Lovely Music, Ltd. CD 1019, 1994
- "Self Portrait", on Upper Air Observation, Barbara Held, flute, Lovely Music, Ltd. CD 3031, 1992
- "Nothing is Real" on Hyper Beatles 2, Eastworld, 1991
- Crossings, Lovely Music, Ltd. CD 1018, 1990 (contains "In Memoriam Jon Higgins," "Septet for Three Winds, Four Strings, and Pure Wave Oscillator," "Crossings")
- "Music for Alpha Waves, Assorted Percussion, and Automated Coded Relays", on Imaginary Landscapes, Elektra/Nonesuch 79235-2, 1989
- Sferics, Lovely Music, Ltd. LP 1017, 1988
- Still and Moving Lines of Silence in Families of Hyperbolas, 5-8, Lovely Music, Ltd. LP 1016, 1985
- Still and Moving Lines of Silence in Families of Hyperbolas, 1-4, Lovely Music, Ltd. LP 1015, 1983
- Music for Solo Performer, Lovely Music, Ltd. LP 1014, 1982
- I am Sitting in a Room, Lovely Music, Ltd. LP/CD 1013, 1981/90
- Music On A Long Thin Wire, Lovely Music, Ltd. LP/CD 1011, 1980/92
- Bird and Person Dyning/The Duke of York, Cramps, 1975
- "Vespers", on Electronic Sound, Mainstream MS-5010, 1971
- "I am sitting in a room", on SOURCE Record #3, 1970
- "North American Time Capsule", on Music of Our Time series, CBS Odyssey Records, 1967

== Films ==
- 1976 - Music With Roots in the Aether: Opera for Television. Tape 3: Alvin Lucier. Produced and directed by Robert Ashley. New York City: Lovely Music.
- 2012 - NO IDEAS BUT IN THINGS. Produced and directed by Viola Rusche and Hauke Harder.

== Bibliography ==
- Cox, Christoph. “The Alien Voice: Alvin Lucier’s North American Time Capsule.” In Mainframe Experimentalism: Early Computing and the Foundations of the Digital Arts. Edited by Hannah Higgins and Douglas Kahn. Berkeley: University of California Press, 2009.
- Lucier, Alvin. “Reflections: Interviews, Scores, Writings 1965–1994,” Köln: Edition MusikTexte, 1995. Third enlarged edition (English only), Köln: Edition MusikTexte, 2021.
- Lucier, Alvin. “Music 109: Notes on Experimental Music,” Middletown: Wesleyan University Press, 2012.
- Lucier, Alvin and Simon, Douglas “Chambers: Scores by Alvin Lucier / Interviews with the composer by Douglas Simon” Middletown: Wesleyan University Press, 1980. Electronic edition 2012.
- Lucier, Alvin. “Origins of a Form: Acoustic Exploration, Science and Incessancy.” Leonardo Music Journal 8 (December 1998) — “Ghosts and Monsters: Technology and Personality in Contemporary Music,” pp. 5–11.
- Moore, Thomas. “Alvin Lucier in Conversation with Thomas Moore.” 1983.
