= Yoshio Machida =

Yoshio Machida (町田 良夫, Yoshio Machida; born 1967 in Japan) is a Japanese experimental musician, a steelpanist, composer, and visual artist.

== Biography ==
A member of ASCAP, Machida studied minimal art, music and film at the Tama Art University under Kuniharu Akiyama, Yoshiaki Touno, Sakumi Hagiwara and Kishio Suga. In the 1990s, Machida worked for an international cooperation in Asia and Africa.

Machida's first album Hypernatural (1999) had been featured with Brian Eno and Oval (band) on David Toop's article about Generative music. In 2001, Machida started to play improvised music by Steelpan with computer program Max/MSP. Machida has been invited to perform for music festivals like ISEA2004, Sónar Tokyo, MaerzMusik, etc. In 2004, Machida founded an experimental music label Amorfon. In 2009, Machida composed soundtracks for Van Cleef & Arpels exhibition. In 2017, Machida released "Music from the SYNTHI 100" with Constantin Papageorgiadis. This album was made by only EMS Synthi 100. Machida also organized "Japan-Macedonia exchange art exhibition" and some workshops for children.

As a visual artist, Machida has produced Photobatik like Photogram technique using photographic paper. Photograms are produced by partial exposure and development of the entire photosensitive surface. Photobatik is "whole exposure and partial development." Machida has expanded his technique to overexposure of the photographic paper followed by only fixing the image, resulting in a pink image.

== Discography ==
Solo albums

- CD : Tender Blues (Amorfon, Japan, 2016)
- CD : Music from the SYNTHI (Baskaru, France, 2014)
- 7.5 Vinyl : EMS Synthi Works (CYLAND AUDIO ARCHIVE, Russia, 2013)
- Vinyl : Steelpan Improvisation Series ro (self-release, 2012)
- Vinyl : Steelpan Improvisation Series i (self-release, 2012)
- CD : The Spirit of Beauty: soundtracks for Van Cleef & Arpels (Amorfon, Japan, 2010)
- CD : Steelpan Improvisations:2001-2008 (self-release, 2009)
- CD : Hypernatural #3 (Baskaru, France, 2008)
- CD : Naada (Amorfon, Japan, 2006)
- CD : Infinite Flowers (Amorfon, Japan, 2004)
- CD : Hypernatural #2 (Softl Music, Germany, 2001)
- CD : Hypernatural (Japan, 1999)
- FD : AMORPHOUS (Koan Pieces with Koan software by SSEYO Ltd., 1999)

Solo DVD

- CD : Scape*dance (self-release, 2011)

Group albums

- CD : Yoshio Machida + Constantin Papageorgiadis Music from the SYNTHI 100 (Amorfon, Japan, 2016)
- CD : Walk With The Penguin Charm (Amorfon, Japan, 2016)
- CD : Jorge Queijo / Hiroki Chiba / Yoshio Machida Luminant (Amorfon, Japan, 2016)
- CD : Ohanami Agapanthus (Wonderyou, Japan, 2013)
- CD : miimo miimo 5 (self-release, 2012)
- CD : miimo miimo 4 (self-release, 2011)
- CD : Ohanami Ohanami (Wonderyou, Japan, 2010)
- CD : miimo miimo 3 (self-release, 2010)
- CD : miimo miimo 2 (self-release, 2009)
- CDR : miimo miimo (self-release, 2007)
- CD : Walk With The Penguin steal a spoon for you (Amorfon, Japan, 2007)

== Compilation ==
- 7.5'Vinyl : V.A. CAA#20 (CYLAND AUDIO ARCHIVE, Russia, 2015)
- CD : V.A. miimo "Starz File Vol.3 (Avex, Japan, 2009)
- CD+DVD : V.A. SILENT ROOM FAKTORY BOX 01 | skoltz_kolgen (SK Factory, Canada, 2007)
- CD : V.A. Yasujirō Ozu - Hitokomakura (and/OAR, USA, 2007)
- CD : V.A. Resonance: Steel Pan in the 21st Century (Quiet Design, USA, 2007)
- CD : V.A. water music (commune disc, Japan, 2006)
- CD : V.A. seeds of dub (mao, Japan, 2004)
- CD : V.A *Music for Baby! (Amorfon, Japan, 2004)
- CD : V.A lib. (cubicfabric, Japan, 2003)
- CD : V.A Kraakgeluiden (unsounds, The Netherlands, 2003)
- CD : V.A Japanese Avant Garde (sub rosa, Belgium, 2002)
- CD : V.A (Improvised Music from Japan, Japan, 2002)
