= Jerry Hunt =

American composer (1943–1993)

- Born: 30 November 1943; Waco, Texas, U.S.
- Died: 27 November 1993 (age 49); Canton, Texas, U.S.
- Occupation: Composer
- Known for: Experimental music

Jerry Edward Hunt (November 30, 1943 – November 27, 1993) was an American composer who created works using live electronics partly controlled by his ritualistic performance techniques which were influenced by his interest in the occult. He was considered a pioneer of live, electronic and computer-aided audio and video. Hunt lived his entire life in Texas, living in a house he built himself on his family's ranchland. For Hunt, it was financially necessary to live in Texas, but almost impossible to create a career within the state. Hunt was often described as "hyperactive" and always on the move. He was also often either chewing on tobacco or chewing gum. He often dressed conservatively, in a suit or button-up shirt and tie. He was said to have a "wicked sense of humor."

== Early life and education ==
Hunt became interested in the occult early in life. He became an initiate in a Rosicrucian order at age 14 and a relative of his was a Freemason. As a teenager, Hunt put ads in the local newspapers, offering mail-order instructions "in the path of the infinite." When a Dallas couple visited and asked for "Master Jerry," his parents became very concerned about his mental health. He was subsequently sent to Galveston, Texas for a psychiatric evaluation which found him to be "well adjusted." Hunt's parents may have also been concerned about their son's homosexuality. Although Hunt later became an atheist, this love of the occult and a sense of wonder for magic and ritual would continue to influence his performances and body of work.

Hunt studied composition at the University of North Texas. As a young adult, Hunt worked as a pianist for various nightclub acts in Texas. He worked as a pianist until 1969. He said, of the piano, that it was really the only traditional instrument he'd ever enjoyed playing.

== Work and artistic vision ==
Jerry Hunt briefly taught at Southern Methodist University.

Jerry Hunt's body of work was very much influenced by his interest in the occult and his "personal link" to Texas. Several of Hunt's compositions were created through Hunt's interpretations of "hermetic, numerological systems and codes." Hunt rarely used traditional instruments in his work. He was a self-taught inventor of electrical and computer-aided musical devices. His musical style is difficult to categorize, but often includes layers of sound that may or may not exist harmoniously with one another.

Jerry Hunt began to perform live in 1978. Hunt's live performances were considered unique and honest by art-critics. Others have referred to his work as "wonderfully disorienting" because the audience couldn't tell from where the sounds or images were coming from. He was also very interested in the idea of performance which instead of telling people what to think, would "seed" ideas in both the audience and performer. His work was also designed to be less than perfect in the sense that certain movements or gestures would likely, but not always produce a corresponding sound. Hunt was also very interested in the idea of sound. Was a sound "new" or was the experience of the sound what was actually "new?"

In 1983, Hunt was a guest composer/performance artist at a 2-day residency at the University of North Texas. Through February 14 and 15, he performed 2 concerts and created a "continuous sound gallery."

In the 1990s he collaborated with other artists, including Karen Finley, Mike Patton, 77 Hz, Michael Schell, Paul Panhuysen, and Philip Krumm. Hunt was also the founder of IRIDA Records, which released recordings with works by Larry Austin, James Fulkerson, Dary John Mizelle, Rodney Waschka II, and others, as well as recordings of his own music.

=== Performances ===
"Diverse Works" (1985) performed in Houston, Texas.

"Birome (Zone): Cube" (1988) was a performance that consisted of multi-layered, computer-generated sound and where Jerry Hunt stomped back and forth, clapping his hands and shining lights and shaking artifacts at the audience. Cymbals, bells, rattles and wood blocks were also used to produce various sounds. In addition, "amoebic" images moved across two television screens in the background.

== Later life and death ==
=== NEA controversy ===
In the early 1990s, Jerry Hunt and Karen Finley were involved in a controversy over grant money distributed by the National Endowment for the Arts (NEA). Hunt and Finley proposed a grant for $20,000 which would cover the funds needed to create a collaborative work using a "talk-show format to explore mental illness." Funds were released in 1991, after being rejected the year before.

The controversy included allegations of NEA support for "obscene and blasphemous art." It also alleged a perceived conflict of interest in the grant-awarding process of the NEA because Hunt was a member of the New Forms grant panel.

=== Suicide ===
Jerry Hunt committed suicide at his home near Canton, Texas after suffering from long-term terminal lung cancer and emphysema. He used carbon monoxide, spending an additional thousand dollars for an automatic shut-off valve to not cause a hazard after he died. Before his suicide, he videotaped himself demonstrating the apparatus, a mask attached to a cylinder of carbon monoxide gas (see Mercitron).

== Partial discography ==
Other Places—Lois Svard performs Elodie Laten, Jerry Hunt, Kyle Gann, Lois Svard, piano. New York: Lovely Music Ltd., 1997. Audio CD.

- "Trapani (Stream)"

Gay American Composers Composers Recordings, Inc., 1997. Audio CD.

- "Transform (Stream)"

Jerry Hunt: Lattice. New York: New World Records, 2007. (Rerelease of CRI recording from 1996 which was a rerelease of the IRIDA recording listed below from 1979, with the addition of "Lattice".)

- "Lattice"
- "Transform (Stream)"
- "Cantegral Segment 18.17"
- "Transphalba"
- "Volta (Kernel)"

Jerry Hunt works by Hunt and Barton Workshop. Tzadik, 2004. Audio CD.

- "Phalba (Ila Multiplex)"
- "Chimanzzi (Variant)"
- "Cantegral Segment No. 19"
- "Chimanzzi (Olun)"

Ground : Five Mechanic Convention Streams Bridgeport, CT: O.O. Discs, 1992. Audio CD.

- "Chimanzzi (Olun): core"
- "Lattice (stream): ordinal"
- "Transform (stream) monopole"
- "Talk (slice)"
- "Bitom (stream)"

Jerry Hunt, performed by Michael Schell. St. Paul, CT: Innova 114

- "Song Drape No. 2"

Jerry Hunt works by Hunt, performed by Hunt. Canton, Texas: Irida 0032, 1979.

- "Transform (Stream)"
- "Cantegral Segment 18.17"
- "Transphalba"
- "Volta (Kernel)"

The Aerial, Volume 1. Santa Fe, New Mexico: Nonsequitur Foundation, 1990.

- "Babylon (string)"

Fluxus – works by Jerry Hunt / Philip Krumm / Mama Baer / Kommissar Hjuler. Germany: Psych. kg 263. 2016. LP.

- "Fluud"
