= Source: Music of the Avant Garde =

Source: Music of the Avant-Garde (aka Source magazine)
- Editor: Larry Austin (1967–72); Stanley Lunetta (1972–73)
- Categories: Experimental music
- Circulation: 2,000
- Publisher: Composer/Performer Edition
- Founded: 1967
- First issue: 1967
- Final issue Number: 1973; Issue #11
- Country: U.S.A.
- Based in: Davis, CA, 1967–69; Sacramento, CA, 1970–73
- Language: English

Source: Music of the Avant-Garde, also known as Source Magazine, was an independent, not-for-profit musical and artistic magazine published between 1967 and 1973 by teachers and students of the University of California, Davis, California. It emerged from the flourishing Californian musical experimentalism of the late 1950s-early 1960s, at UC-Davis and Mills College. The 11 issues document new music practices of the period like indeterminacy, performance, graphic scores, electronic music and intermedia arts.

== Origin ==
Source Magazine's board of editors first met in the New Music Ensemble, formed in 1963, an improvised music group led by UC-Davis music teacher Larry Austin and comprising two of his students: Stanley Lunetta on drums and Dary John Mizelle on trombone, in addition to Wayne Johnson, bass clarinet; Art Woodbury, saxophone; and Richard Swift, keyboards, sometimes augmented by occasional visitors like flutist Jon Gibson or soprano Billie Alexander.

In the Spring of 1966, the group officially launched the "Composer/Performer Edition" imprint with the idea of publishing a catalog of graphic scores and avantgarde music related material by composers they felt close to, like Frederic Rzewski, Cornelius Cardew, Allan Bryant, or Jon Phetteplace of Musica Elettronica Viva. In 1966, they sent a mailing of 5,000 invitations nationwide, calling for pieces in the form of original scores. Composer/Performer Edition published some of these music scores separately, but the team felt the need to collect the material they received in the form of a magazine titled Source. Austin, Lunetta, Mizelle, Johnson, Woodbury and administrative manager Paul Roberts formed the magazine's board, with Austin becoming chief editor.

A twelfth issue was planned but never made it to printing due to lack of internal funding.

== Circulation ==
Each issue had a print run of 2,000 copies, although the first issue originally ran 1,000 copies before selling out and warranting an additional 1,000 copies. According to chief editor Larry Austin, the spiral-bound, 10 3/4 x 13 1/2 inches landscape format was inspired by some of John Cage's graphic scores as well as the benefit of being able to stand the magazine up on a piano or music stand when performing pieces. Subscribers were composers, teachers, performers or libraries located in North America and Europe. The magazine was never subsidized or funded by any institution.

== Music content ==
Despite or thanks to its short existence, the scope of Source magazine appears both focused and wide-ranging. Emerging from a rejection of formal concert performance and traditional music notation, Source also included performance art and sound poetry in its coverage of avantgarde graphic scores, therefore expanding the very definition of music. It welcomed veterans like Harry Partch, Lukas Foss, John Cage or Morton Feldman, as well as young Turks of the avant-garde like Hugh Davies (b1943), Daniel Lentz (b1942) or Jerry Hunt (b1943).

Over the years, Source covered West Coast experimentalism of the 1960s (Gordon Mumma, Robert Ashley); American Minimalism (Steve Reich, Christian Wolff, Earle Brown); the birth of Sound Art as we know it (Alvin Lucier, Max Neuhaus, Annea Lockwood); improvised and indeterminate music (the ONCE Group, Musica Elettronica Viva, Toshi Ichiyanagi); Fluxus and performance art with Dick Higgins or Allan Kaprow; European sound poetry with the Fylkingen affiliated artists or Bernard Heidsieck; the British Systems music of Cornelius Cardew, Howard Skempton, Michael Parsons and Gavin Bryars.

Source also welcomed the use of advanced technology (electronic, video, communications) to expand music's scope. The magazine published information on Don Buchla's newly built synthesizer, Nam June Paik's first video experiments or Lowell Cross's video/laser light shows featured in issue #9, 1971. The trend was perfectly in synch with the Art & Technology show at Los Angeles County Museum of Art, 1971, where contemporary artists were offered to partner with engineers and technicians of their choice.

== Specificities ==
- Themed issues: Some issues of Source have overtly or underlying specific themes, like issue #3, January 1968, stressing the importance of groups in new music and including scores, interviews or essays by ONCE Group, Musica Elettronica Viva, Sonic Arts Union and New Music Ensemble; issue #8, July 1970, is on concrete and sound poetry, with a report on the Swedish scene from the Fylkingen festival and venue, and other independent sound poets like Bob Cobbing and Henri Chopin; issue #6, July 1969, is on Politics; issue #9 (1971) features circuit diagrams; issue #11 (1972) introduces Fluxus and intermedia.
- Guest editors: a number of issues had guest editors who were invited to choose among the scores received by the magazine for possible inclusion, make their own suggestions of graphic scores to publish and bring their expertise on a specific field. Alvin Lucier included electronic experiments, in addition to the British Systems music forming the core of issue 10. Ken Friedman was asked to focus on Fluxus, performance and intermedia art in issue #11. John Cage took advantage of the skills of Source's resourceful printer, Doug Galbreath, to create a version of Not Wanting To Say Anything About Marcel printed on transparencies inserted in issue #7–8.
- Accompanying LP recordings: several issues came with a pair of 10-inch records, a format chosen to fit with the magazine's format of nearly 11" x 14". These recordings collected sound works by artists included in the magazine with issues 4, 7/8 and 9. The two 10-inch LPs coming with issue #4 were subsidized by Columbia records, thanks to David Behrman, an A&R representative for Columbia in the 1960s.

== List of issues ==
Source #1 – January 1967
Contents:
- Robert Ashley
- Larry Austin
- Karlheinz Stockhausen
- Earle Brown
- Giuseppe Chiari
- Barney Childs
- Harry Partch
- David Reck
- Bertran Turetzky

Source #2 – July 1967
Contents:
- John Cage
- Alvin Curran
- Morton Feldman
- Jerry Hunt
- Toshi Ichiyanagi
- Ben Johnston
- Gordon Mumma
- Harry Partch
- Arthur Woodburry
- Stanley Lunetta

Source #3 – January 1968
Contents:
- ONCE Group
- Musica Elettronica Viva
- Sonic Arts Union
- New Music Ensemble
- David Behrman
- Harold Budd
- Will Johnson
- Douglas Leedy
- Daniel Lentz
- John Lifton
- Robert Moran
- Pauline Oliveros
- Steve Reich
- Paul Chiara

Source #4 – July 1968
Contents:
- Robert Ashley
- Larry Austin
- Mario Bertoncini
- John Cage
- Lukas Foss
- Ben Johnston
- Udo Kasemets
- Jocy de Oliveira
- Lowell Cross

Source #5 – January 1969
Contents:
- Larry Austin
- Barney Childs
- Christian Wolff
- Jon Hassell
- Dick Higgins
- Annea Lockwood
- Max Neuhaus
- R. Murray Schafer
- Robert Erikson
- Arthur Woodburry
- Stanley Lunetta
- New Percussion Quartet
- Andrew Stiller

Source #6 – July 1969
Contents:
- Harold Budd
- Jani Christou
- Morton Feldman
- Daniel Lentz
- Dick Higgins
- Alvin Lucier
- Roger Reynolds
- Philip Corner
- David Rosenboom
- Frederic Rzewski
- Dary John Mizelle
- John Dinwiddie
- Joel Gutsche

Source #7 – January 1970
Contents:
- John Cage
- Ben Johnston
- Pauline Oliveros
- Allen Strange
- Robert Moran
- Dick Higgins
- Alvin Lucier
- Jocy de Oliveira
- Barbara Rose
- Mark Riener
- Barry J. Spinello
- Arthur Woodburry
- John Dinwiddie
- Keith Muscutt

Source #8 – July 1970
Contents:
- Larry Austin
- Lars Gunnar Bodin
- Boudewijn Buckinx
- Henri Chopin
- Bob Cobbing
- Morton Feldman
- Peter Garland
- Harvey Matusow
- Gunmar Harding
- Freddy de Vree
- Bernard Heidsieck
- Ake Hodell
- Bengt Emil Johnson
- Bengt af Klintberg
- Ferdinand Krivet
- Ilmar Laaban
- Alcides Lanza
- Annea Lockwood
- Ladislav Novak
- donwalkermusic.com
- Lowell Cross
- Arrigo Lora-Totino
- Edward Kobrin
- Sten Hanson
- Gust Gils
- Sven Hansell
- Kyra Gale
- John Dinwiddie
- Svante Bodin
- Stanley Lunetta
- Jan Olav Mallander
- Ken Maue
- Arne Mellnäs
- Franz Mon

Source #9 – Published 1971
Contents:
- Don Buchla
- Alvin Curran
- Annea Lockwood
- David Rosenboom
- Nicolas Slonimsky
- Marilyn Wood
- Jim Burns
- Jacques Brodier
- Lowell Cross
- Paul Klerr
- Manford Eaton
- Nelson Howe
- Edward Kobrin
- Arrigo Lora-Totino

Source #10 – Published 1971
Contents:
- Portsmouth Sinfonia
- Sonic Arts Union
- Scratch Orchestra
- Anthony Braxton
- George Brecht
- Gavin Bryars
- Cornelius Cardew
- Michael Chant
- Hugh Davies
- Christopher Hobbs
- David Jackman
- Stuart Jones
- John Lifton
- Annea Lockwood
- Alvin Lucier
- Mary Lucier
- Richard Martin
- Harvey Matusow
- Daniel Lentz
- Dary John Mizelle
- Robert Moran
- Pauline Oliveros
- Steve Reich
- Frederic Rzewski
- Pauline Oliveros
- Michael Parsons
- Steve Reich
- Gerald Shapiro
- Howard Skempton
- Chris Robbins
- Gentle Fire
- Alan Brett
- Greg Bright
- Ivan Hume Carter
- Graham Hearn
- Stuart Marshall
- Jon Phetteplace
- Douglas Simon
- Robin P. Mortimore

Source #11 – Published 1972
Contents:
- Charles Amirkhanian
- Eric Andersen
- Martin Bartlett
- Joseph Beuys
- Christo
- Robert Filliou
- Ken Friedman
- Dick Higgins
- Allan Kaprow
- Per Kirkeby
- Milan Knizak
- Max Neuhaus
- Nam June Paik
- Jack Reynolds
- Stanley Marsh
- Nicolas Slonimsky
- Endre Tot
- Wolf Vostell
- Albrecht Dietrich
- Eugen Brikcius
- Peter Donath
- Jaroslaw Kozlowski
- Stanley Lunetta
- Janos Major
- Tom Marioni
- Janos Gnazzo
- Victor Grauer
- Gyula Gulias
- Olaf Hanel
- Stu Horn
- Image Bank
- Zdzislaw Jurkiewicz
- Dora Maurer
- Maria Michalowska
- John Paul Rhinehart
- Zorka Saglova
- Jiri Valoch
