= Steve Duke =

American jazz musician

Steve Duke (born 1954) is an American classical and jazz saxophonist noted for his performance of contemporary classical music, particularly computer music.

== Education and teaching career ==
Steve Duke earned both B.M. and M.M. degrees in performance at the University of North Texas. There he studied saxophone performance with Jim Riggs and Dennis F. Diemond. He studied flute with Ralph Johnson and Clare Johnson, oboe with Charles Veazey, and clarinet with Lee Gibson. He studied jazz with Joe Henderson and Joe Daley. While at North Texas, he was awarded the Phi Kappa Lambda Outstanding Soloist Award, the highest award given for classical music performance. Duke also performed in the One O'Clock Lab Band playing lead alto saxophone.

Duke joined the faculty of Northern Illinois University (NIU) in 1980 until his recent retirement in 2011. He was awarded the Presidential Research Professorship at NIU in 1999. In addition to teaching contemporary saxophone repertoire, techniques and performance, Duke also teaches using the Feldenkrais Method.

== Repertoire ==
As a jazz saxophonist, Duke has worked with Joe Williams (jazz singer), Ella Fitzgerald, Zoot Sims, Nelson Riddle, Rosemary Clooney, and Louis Bellson among others. His first solo album "Monk by 2" featured saxophone and piano duo improvisations with Joe Pinzarrone on the music of Thelonious Monk and was released by Columbia Records in 1994.

Beginning in 1993, he focused on solo contemporary classical music and computer music works. He has premiered and/or recorded more than 20 solo works. Composers who have written solo works for Duke include Larry Austin, William O. Smith, Jan Bach, Cort Lippe, James Phelps, Luigi Ceccarelli, Elainie Lillios, Les Thimmig, Rodney Waschka II, Robert Fleisher, and David Maki.

Of particular importance are BluesAx for alto and soprano saxophones and computer music, by Larry Austin, (for which Austin was the first American composer to receive the Magistere (Magisterium) Award in the 23rd International Electroacoustic Music Competition at Bourges in 1996) and "Veiled Resonance" for soprano saxophone and live interactive electronics, by Elainie Lillios (for which Lillios received a first prize in the 36e Concours Internationale de Bourges in 2009). Saint Ambrose, an opera for soprano saxophonist/actor based on the life of Ambrose Bierce. Saint Ambrose has been widely praised and excerpts have been performed by Duke and John Sampen throughout the United States. Duke recorded Saint Ambrose for Capstone Records.

In 2005, he formed the Steve Duke Trio, which performs new jazz works.

== Partial discography ==
"Monk by 2", New York: Sony/Columbia Records, 1994.

- Works by Thelonious Monk

"The Computer in the Computer Age – VI", CDCM Computer Music Series, Volume 23, Baton Rouge: Centaur Records, 1994.

- Sax Houses by James Phelps

"Cultures Electroniques/9”, Bourges, France: Serie GMEB/UNESCO/CIME, 1996.

- BluesAx by Larry Austin

“Dexter Morrill: Three Concertos”, Baton Rouge: Centaur Records, 1997.

- Concerto for Saxophone & Orchestra by Dexter Morrill

"Saint Ambrose", Brooklyn, NY: Capstone Records, 2002.

- Saint Ambrose by Rodney Waschka II
