= IRIDA Records =

IRIDA Records was an American classical music record label focusing particularly on contemporary classical music. It was established by Jerry Hunt in 1979, and was based in Canton, Texas. The label released at least seven sound recordings featuring works by Hunt, James Fulkerson, Larry Austin, Rodney Waschka II, Dary John Mizelle, and others. In addition, apparently at least one film by Michael Schell was distributed by the label. The label went out of business in the early 1990s.

== Discography ==
- "Jerry Hunt" (1979)

Various works by Jerry Hunt

- "Texas Music"

Works by Hunt, Philip Krumm, and Jerry Willingham

- "Dary John Mizelle"

Various works by Mizelle

- "Larry Austin: Hybrid Musics" (1980)

Various works by Larry Austin

- "James Fulkerson: Works" (1980)

Various works by Fulkerson

- "BL Lacerta" (1982)

Works by the Texas improvisation group BL Lacerta including a live recording

- "Cartography" (1986)

Works by Gene De Lisa, Robert Keefe, and Rodney Waschka II

== See also ==
- List of record labels
