= Elainie Lillios =

American classical composer

Elainie Lillios is a musician specializing in electronic and electroacoustic composition and performance. Lillios studied composition with Larry Austin, Jonty Harrison, Jon Christopher Nelson, Joseph Klein, and others. She has been a professor at Bowling Green State University since 2000. She was awarded First Prize in the 36th International Competition of Electroacoustic Music and Sonic Art in Bourges in 2009. In 2012, she was awarded a commission from the Groupe de Recherches Musicales in Paris. Her works have been included in several festivals such as Electronic Music Midwest Vox Novus's Fifteen Minutes of Fame, and 60x60

== Works ==
=== Compositions ===
- Oceanus IV (1986)
- Eclectronic (1988)
- Pieces of Partch (1988)
- Cactus, Rock, Beaters (1991)
- Textural Visions (1991), 10:00
- CELLAR for fixed media (1994–95), 5:02
- of a Single Mind? for alto saxophone and electronics (1995), 12:07
- Au deuxième étage for fixed media (1996), 3:00
- Supplications (1996)
- Sounds from the second floor (1996–97), 7:00
- Arturo for fixed media (1998), 13:35
- Threads for fixed media (1998), 4:50
- Stumbling Dance for fixed media (1998–99), 14:45
- Earth Ascending for female voice and electronics (2000), 15:09
- Dreams in the Desert for fixed media (2001), 10:45
- Backroads for fixed media (2002), 10:51
- Experiential Extremism installation (2003)
- Speaking… again for fixed media (2003), 11:00
- Hastening Toward the Half Moon for fixed media (2004), 9:23
- Three “B” Textures for fixed media (2005), 4:27
- Encounter(s) installation (2007)
- Listening Beyond… for fixed media (2007), 8:20
- One for Two for bass clarinet and percussion (2007)
- Wedge for alto saxophone and piano (2007) 3:50
- Exit Variations I for fixed media (2008), 1:33
- The Long Way Home for soprano and percussion (2008), 7:48
- Stargazing for fixed media (2008), 1:00
- Toronto Island Contrasts for fixed media (2008), 1:00
- Veiled Resonance for soprano saxophone and electronics (2008), 14:10
- A Little Austinato for fixed media (2009), 3:02
- Inhabitants installation (2009)
- Nostalgic Visions for piano and electronics (2009), 11:15
- Among Fireflies for alto flute and electronics (2010), 10:50
- Deep Fire for fixed media (2010), 1:00
- Fireflies (2010), 5:30
- Internal Distances installation (2010)
- Entracte for fixed media (2011), 1:00
- November Twilight for trumpet and electronics (2011), 11:04
- Sibylline Glimpses for piano solo (2011), 5:45
- Dry Wind for trumpet in C (2012), 3:00
- Entracte (2012), 1:00
- La fête de la huitième décennie for fixed media (2012), 2:10
- Last Night I Dreamed That My Whole House Was Clean for fixed media (2012), 1:00
- The Rush of the Brook Stills the Mind for multiple percussion and electronics (2013), 15:40
- Summer Sketches for flute trio (2013)
- Emergent Submergence installation (2014)
- On the essence of memory for fixed media (2014) [withdrawn]
- Contemplating Larry for fixed media (2015), 12:12
- Solitude's Stark Wilderness (2015) 4:21
- After Long Drought for vibraphone and electronics (2016), 11:31
- Sleep’s Undulating Tide for flute and electronics (2016), 12:49
- Hazy Moonlight for soprano saxophone, percussion, and electronics (2017), 12:30
- Liquid|Crystal|Vapor for viola and electronics (2018) 12:30
- Undertow for bass clarinet and electronics (2018), 10:00
- Whistle~ Whisper~ Wisp for solo flute (2018) 10:00
- Immeasurable Distance for percussion (mixed metals) and electronics (2019), 9:12
- Vox Magma for fixed media (2020), 0:58
- Don't. Blink. for clarinet, violin, viola, cello, electronics, and video (2021), 7:00
- Living Between Seconds for trumpet in C, drum set, piano, and electronics (2021), 14:45
- Time-Lapse for vibraphone and electronics (2021), 10:11
- Ice Fields for fixed media (2022), 16:00
- Night Sky for fixed media (2022), 8:40
- Tonic in G for fixed media (2022), 1:20

=== Video and Film Work ===
- 2B Textures (2008)
- Textural Encounters (2008)
- Sweeping Memories (2012)
- Paradigm Shift (2015)
- When a Circle Decides Not to be a Circle Anymore (2022)

== Awards, grants and commissions ==
=== Grants and commissions ===
- INA/GRM
- Rèseaux
- International Computer Music Association
- La Muse en Circuit
- New Adventures in Sound Art
- ASCAP/SEAMUS (1999)
- LSU’s Center for Computation and Technology
- Sonic Arts Research Centre
- Ohio Arts Council
- National Foundation for the Advancement of the Arts.

=== Invitations ===
- Groupe de Recherche Musicales
- Rien à Voir
- festival l’espace du son
- June in Buffalo
