= Whispers Out of Time =

Composition by Roger Reynolds

- by Roger Reynolds
- Form: String ensemble
- Commissioned by: Amherst College Music Department
- Duration: 26 minutes
- Movements: six

Whispers Out of Time (1984) is a composition by Roger Reynolds (b. 1934) for string orchestra. He was awarded the 1989 Pulitzer Prize for Music for the piece, causing Kyle Gann to quip that it was the first time it was being given to an experimental composer since Charles Ives in 1947. It premiered on December 11, 1988, at Buckley Recital Hall, Amherst College, Massachusetts, with Harvey Sollberger conducting.

1. The soul is a captive
2. A magma of interiors
3. Like a wave breaking on a rock
4. The surprise, the tension are in the concept
5. A chill, a blight moving outward
6. The portrait's will to endure

The jury selected the piece, saying: "The work is scored for string soloist and string orchestra. It is conceived on a broad scale. It is visionary, deeply felt, contemplative and singularly personal in nature." The piece is inspired by John Ashbery's extended poem, "Self-Portrait in a Convex Mirror". itself named for the painting of the same name. Each movement is named with a line from the poem, and the title is the final line. Violin, viola, cello, and bass soloists are featured in front of the orchestra and quotations are used from Beethoven's Piano Sonata, Opus 81a (Les Adieux) in the first movement and from Mahler's 9th Symphony in the fourth movement.

== Discography ==
- Whispers Out of Time: Works for Orchestra by Roger Reynolds (Mode: 2007).
- Roger Reynolds: Whispers Out of Time; Transfigured Wind 2 (New World: 1990).
