= Joe Daley (musician) =

American musician (1918–1994)

- Born: July 30, 1918; Salem, Ohio
- Died: March 5, 1994 (aged 75)
- Occupation: Musician

Joe Daley (July 30, 1918 – March 5, 1994) was an American jazz tenor saxophonist, composer, and music teacher. Daley was part of the Chicago jazz scene for 40 years. Musicians who studied with Daley include Grammy winners David Sanborn and Paul Winter, Emmy winner James DiPasquale, Richard Corpolongo, Chuck Domanico, and John Klemmer.

== In Detroit ==
Joseph Albert Daley was born July 30, 1918, in Salem, Ohio. He moved to Detroit, Michigan as a child. At age 18, Daley got his first saxophone. He started with an alto sax but soon gravitated to a tenor sax.

Daley was drawn to the jazz bands of Count Basie, Duke Ellington, Cab Calloway, Larry Clinton, Tommy Dorsey, and Artie Shaw, and his early models for playing were Coleman Hawkins, Georgie Auld, and Lester "Pres" Young. He studied with orchestral saxophonist Larry Teal and others, but wanting to expand beyond them into jazz, Daley was forced to become mostly self-taught.

In the late 1930s Daley played with small combos in Detroit and did some touring, including to New York. He appreciated that the New York and Detroit branches of the American Federation of Musicians were racially integrated (it would not be until 1974 that all locals would be so), which gave Daley the opportunity to experience a unique musical and cultural crossover, a rarity for the times.

When World War II began, he enlisted in the Army Air Corps and became a pilot. He played sax in the Air Corps Band. After his discharge, he moved to Chicago.

== In Chicago ==
After the war when Bebop music emerged and Charlie "Bird" Parker came on the scene, Daley, like many jazz musicians, was impressed by Parker’s style, which took Daley in a more experimental direction musically. To expand his musicianship with a classical musical education, he earned a Bachelor's Degree in Music from Chicago Musical College (now part of Roosevelt University). He further pursued a Master's degree in Composition.

In 1950-51 Daley toured with Woody Herman in the Third Herd band with Urbie Green on trombone, Sonny Igoe on drums, and Red Mitchell on bass. He also performed about 30 uncredited sides for Pat Boone on Dot Records. Daley worked as a jobbing musician and as a music teacher at Chicago’s Rizzo School of Music.

As early as 1955, he was inspired by the work of Ornette Coleman to take up what became known as "free" jazz. Although not commercially viable at the time, he later focused on this style with his bands, The Joe Daley Trio and The Joe Daley Quorum.

The Joe Daley Trio formed in 1959 with percussionist Hal Russell and bassist Russell Thorne. In 1963 they played at the Newport Jazz Festival, and RCA Records later released The Joe Daley Trio At Newport ’63. At the Down Beat Jazz Festival in 1965, bassist Thorne had been replaced with Clyde Flowers. In 1972, The Joe Daley Quorum was formed with Richard Corpolongo on alto sax and piccolo, Bobby Lewis on trumpet, Bobby Roberts on electric bass (later Steve LaSpina), and Hal Russell (later Dan Martin) on percussion.

Daley played dates in many Chicago clubs and hotels of the era, including Mr. Kelly’s, The Lemon Tree, The Playboy Club, The Happy Medium, The Downbeat, The London House, The BackRoom, and The Jazz Showcase, among others. From 1971 to 1974 he had a society music job in the house band at the Mill Run Playhouse, a renowned dinner theatre outside Chicago. He played behind Frank Sinatra, Tony Bennett, Sammy Davis Jr. and Ella Fitzgerald. In 1968 Daley performed a jazz composition in concert for The Chicago Symphony Orchestra. He occasionally played commercials and did some promotions for Selmer Instruments.

From 1978 to 1987, he played a regular weekly session at Chicago’s Orphan’s nightclub, with a rotating cast of local jazz players and some of Daley’s own students. He paid the rhythm section out of his own pocket when nights were slow.

Early in his career, Daley played a Selmer saxophone. By the 1950s he played a vintage 1920’s Conn "New Wonder" sax. In the 1970s and 1980s he played a King Super 20 sax, with a Berg Larsen 95/2 mouthpiece. Daley also doubled on clarinet, and in the 1960s he added flute to his instruments.

== Teaching ==
Daley gave music lessons for 40 years. He trained saxophone students from the beginner level and up. For musicians who were already musically competent on saxophone or other instruments, including voice, he taught improvisation, composition, and how to expand their range. DePaul University’s School of Music invited Daley to teach jazz at the university. They accepted his requirement that students be sent to his home for lessons. Daley joined the faculty in 1984 and taught until he left Chicago in 1987. Notable students included: Richard Corpolongo, Steve Duke, Rich Fudoli, Kent Minor and Abshalom Ben Shlomo.

== Recordings ==
- The Joe Daley Trio at Newport, ’63, RCA Records LSP-2763, 1963
- Sonic Blast, Joe Daley and Richard Corpolongo, CODA#2001, Chicago, 1983
- Chicago Shouts, Dave Remington's Big Band (Author), et al., U-37596, Universal Records, 1968
- Charlie Parker Memorial Concert, Cadet 2CA-60002, the Kenny Dorham Sextet, with Daley’s fiery contributions on 'Just Friends', North Park Hotel, Chicago, 1970
- Jazz Inside Out, Guy Fricano, Forever Jazz Records, 1984
- In The Forefront, Bobby Lewis, Daley composer on 2 tracks, reissue of 1977 LP, S-SSD 0079 UPC: 700797007922: Southport Records, Chicago, August 2000
- The Joe Daley Quartet live at Orphan's, 1981, Eric Hochberg Bandcamp.com

== Semi-regular players with Daley ==
- Bill Harrison (bass)
- Paul Wertico (percussion)
- Bobby Lewis (trumpet)
- Kelly Sill (bass)
- Eric Hochberg (bass)
- John Campbell (piano)
- Larry Luchowski (piano)
- Steve LaSpina (bass)
- Joel Spencer (percussion)
- Trumpters Cy Touff (trumpet) and Bobby Lewis' band Ears included a rotating cast drawn from the finest of Chicago’s jazz players that typically numbered around eight. Daley, Campbell, George Bean, Don Shelton, and a couple of guys from the Chicago Symphony were regulars.
- Rusty Jones (drums)
- Drummer Jerry Coleman’s band Nine Burner included Daley and Ron Kolber, baritone and alto sax.
- Drummer Greg Sergo’s band Ellington Dynasty, dedicated to Duke Ellington’s small group writing, included Daley and Ron Kolber.
