= James Fulkerson =

American composer (born 1945)

James Orville Fulkerson (born July 2, 1945, in Streator, Illinois) is an American composer, now living in the Netherlands, of mostly stage, orchestral, chamber, vocal, piano, electroacoustic, and multimedia works. He is also active as a trombonist.

== Education ==
James Fulkerson received his musical training at Illinois Wesleyan University, where he earned his BMus in 1967, and the University of Illinois at Urbana-Champaign, where he earned his MMus in 1968. His principal compositional teachers were Herbert Brün, Kenneth Gaburo, Lejaren Hiller, Ben Johnston, and Salvatore Martirano and his principal trombone teachers were Carmine Caruso and John Silber. He also studied with Ernst Giehl, Robert Gray, Edward Kleinhammer, Donald Miller, and Donald Reinhardt.

== Career ==
As a trombonist, he is esteemed for his performances of experimental music. More than 200 works have been composed for him, including two by John Cage. He has recorded for the Attacca Babel, Deutsche Grammophon, Etcetera, Lovely Music, Mode, IRIDA Records and Nonesuch labels. In addition, he founded the Barton Workshop in Amsterdam in 1989, an ensemble whose goal is to perform works on the leading edge of contemporary music, including some that are not notated, and has since served as its director and trombonist. Barton collaborated with many composers, including Nicolas Collins, Frank Denyer, Alvin Lucier, Philip Corner, and Christian Wolff. It also has given premières of works by Henryk Mikołaj Górecki, Jerry Hunt, Ernstalbrecht Stiebler, and Galina Ustvolskaya.
