= Philip Krumm =

American composer (born 1941)

Philip Krumm (born April 7, 1941, in Baltimore, Maryland) is an American composer who was "a pioneer of modal, repetitive pattern music". Krumm studied orchestration and composition with Ross Lee Finney and Karlheinz Stockhausen.

In 1960, as a high school student, Krumm began producing an early concert series of major modern works by John Cage, Richard Maxfield, Philip Corner, La Monte Young, Terry Riley, himself and others at McNay Art Institute, San Antonio. He recruited "Blue" Gene Tyranny, also in high school at the time, to perform in this series. Krumm then moved to Ann Arbor, MI where he was a performer and composer in the ONCE Festival in 1962–64. While touring with the ONCE Group, he participated in a Carnegie Hall performance with Yoko Ono, George Brecht, and Terry Jennings. In 1963 he met Jerry Hunt while performing at Roger Shattuck's 'Pataphysics Festival in Austin, Texas, and the two composers toured together and collaborated on several projects.

== Compositions ==
- Paragenesis for two violins and piano (1959)
- Axis (1962)
- Mumma Mix (1962)
- Music for Clocks (1962)
- Formations (1962)
- Concerto for saxophone (1964)
- Sound Machine (1966)
- Farewell to LA (electronic theatre, 1975)
- Secret Pleasures (dance suite, 1988–89)
- No Time at All for electronic instruments (1989)
- Into the Pines for electronic instruments (1989)
- The Gabrieli Thing for electronic instruments (1989)
- Banshee Fantasia (commissioned by Bay Area Pianists for 100th anniversary of Henry Cowell’s birth, 1997)
- Film soundtrack: Angel of God (short film)

== Discography ==
- Texas Music: Sound Machine (IRIDA Records, 1966)
- Concerto for Bass Clarinet (Opus One, 1996)
- Music from the Once Festival: Music for Clocks 1961–1966 (New World Records, 2003)
- Formations (Realized by "Blue" Gene Tyranny in 1968; Idea Records US, 2006)
- Fluxus: Jerry Hunt/Philip Krumm/Kommissar Hjuler/Mama Baer (Psych.KG Germany, 2016)

== Other works ==
Work in television: Music Hour (with Jerry Hunt, 1964), Sampler (with Robert Wilson, 1964).

Publications: Music Without Notes (1962), Action Art: A Bibliography of Artists' Performance from Futurism to Fluxus and Beyond (1993).
