= Dary John Mizelle =

American composer

- Born: June 14, 1940 (age 85); Stillwater, Oklahoma
- Education: California State University, Sacramento (B.A.); University of California, Davis (M.A.); University of California, San Diego (Ph.D.)

Dary John Mizelle (born June 14, 1940) is an American composer of avant-garde classical and jazz music.

== Life and career ==
Mizelle studied trombone (B.A. California State University, Sacramento) as well as composition (M.A. University of California, Davis, Ph.D. University of California, San Diego) and while at U.C. Davis participated in the New Music Ensemble (a pioneering free improvisation group that dispensed with scores). He was an original member of the group that founded Source: Music of the Avant Garde magazine. His mentors include: Larry Austin, Richard Swift, Jerome Rosen, Karlheinz Stockhausen, David Tudor, Roger Reynolds, Robert Erickson, Pauline Oliveros, and Kenneth Gaburo.

His music involves mastery of instrumental, electronic and vocal resources as well as his own performance on several different instruments and voice. He works in many different genres and media. His SPANDA project consists of thirteen days of music with a coherent macrostructure, which includes music theater, opera, orchestra works, choral works, electronic music, chamber music, solo instrumental and vocal music as well as combinations and integrations of all these. A prolific composer with works in all media, he has over 450 compositions and 40 jazz tunes. He refers to his music as "multidimensional" in scope and practices his musical art in multiple tuning systems ("macrotonality") and simultaneous tonal, modal and atonal systems ("polyatonality") as well as multiple rhythmic systems (systemic polyrhythm).

His electronic music uses the techniques he refers to as "microsynthesis" (mixing of very short - less than 50 millisecond - elements of different sonic energy components) and "isomorphic synthesis" (the compression of musical macrostructure to the level of waveforms) as well as more conventional techniques such as additive synthesis, granular synthesis and transformation of acoustical sounds.

He has held academic appointments at University of South Florida, Oberlin Conservatory of Music where he was head of the Technology In Music And Related Arts (TIMARA) program, and State University of New York at Purchase where he was Chair of the Composition Program.

He makes his home in Westchester County, New York since 1979.

== List of works ==
Piano Music

- Variations on a Tone Row (1963)
- Piano Opus (1966)
- In Memoriam Igor Stravinsky (1971)
- TRANSFORMS for piano (1975–79)
- Three Easy Pieces (1980–93)
- I Was Standing Quite Close to Process (1991-2)
- Autumnal Equinox (1998)
- ZNV (1998)
- Kitamidorigaoka (1999)
- Zach’s New Blues (2001)
- Fingers on Keys-New Music for Piano Students (2003)
- On Gaku (2005)
- Piano Concerto Number One—Winterscape
- Piano Concerto Number Two—Consciousness
- Fantasy I (2011)
- Fantasy II (2012)
- Sonatas I-IX (1964-2012)

== Discography ==
- Soundscape: Collected Works of Dary John Mizelle Vol. 1 (2000). Furious Artisans FACD6801. Featuring:
1. Metalsong II
2. Soundscape
3. Pi/Grace
4. Samadhi
- Transmutations and metamorphosis (2004). Equilibrium EQ67. Featuring:
1. Transmutations and metamorphoses
- Nataraja Records (2006). Featuring:
1. SPANDA Symphonies of Sound IV : I Was Standing Quite Close to Process
- Transforms: Collected Works of Dary John Mizelle Vol. 2. performed by Laurie Hudicek. Furious Artisans. Featuring:
1. Transforms for Piano (14 of 34)
- The Music of Dary John Mizelle (2021). Other Minds Records OM 2031.
