= Larry Austin =

American composer (1930–2018)

Larry Don Austin (September 12, 1930 – December 30, 2018) was an American composer noted for his electronic and computer music works. He was a co-founder and editor of the avant-garde music periodical Source: Music of the Avant Garde. Austin gained additional international recognition when he realized a completion of Charles Ives's Universe Symphony. Austin served as the president of the International Computer Music Association (ICMA) from 1990 to 1994 and served on the board of directors of the ICMA from 1984 to 1988 and from 1990 to 1998.

== Early life ==
Austin was born in Duncan, Oklahoma. He received a bachelor's (Music Education, 1951) and master's degree (Music, 1952) from University of North Texas College of Music. In 1955 he studied at Mills College, and from 1955 to 1958 he engaged in graduate study at the University of California, Berkeley, leaving to accept a faculty position at the University of California, Davis. Austin studied with Canadian composer Violet Archer at the University of North Texas, French composer Darius Milhaud at Mills College, and with American composer Andrew Imbrie at the University of California, Berkeley.

== Teaching career ==
Austin taught at the University of California, Davis from 1958 till 1972 rising from assistant professor to full professor. While at the University of California, Davis, he founded the improvisational New Music Ensemble. In 1972 he accepted a position at the University of South Florida, where he taught until 1978. In that year he returned to Texas, teaching at his alma mater, the University of North Texas, from 1978 until 1996 when he was named professor emeritus. His notable students include William Basinski, Dary John Mizelle and Rodney Waschka II.

== Compositions ==
Austin received early recognition for his instrumental and orchestral works and of those pieces, Improvisations for Orchestra and Jazz Soloists, was performed and recorded by the New York Philharmonic under Leonard Bernstein, and televised on a Young People's Concert on March 11, 1964. Other orchestral works of special note include Charles Ives's Universe Symphony, "as realized and completed by Larry Austin" (1974–93) for large orchestra, and Sinfonia Concertante: A Mozartean Episode (1986) for chamber orchestra and tape. Chamber works with particularly significant computer music/electro-acoustic music aspects include Accidents for electronically prepared piano (1967), written for David Tudor, Canadian Coastlines: Canonic Fractals for Musicians and Computer Band for eight musicians and tape from 1981, and BluesAx for saxophonist and tape (1995), which won the Magisterium Prize, at Bourges in 1996. BluesAx has been recorded by Steve Duke. Later work included John Explains... (2007) for octophonic sound, based on a recording of an interview with John Cage. John Explains... was premiered at the 2008 North Carolina Computer Music Festival. At the CEMI Circles festival, Austin's 2013 piece, Suoni della Bellagio—Sounds and sights of Bellagio, July–August, 1998 for video and two-channel tape was premiered.

The noted critic Tom Johnson has written of Austin's music, "His style is neither uptown nor downtown, nor is it minimal, eclectic, hypnotic, or European. But it works, it is strongly personal, and it has something to say in all these directions.... The real source of Austin's music, however, is clearly Charles Ives, who also liked musical symbols, enjoyed collaging them together as densely as he could, and never had much of a knack for prettiness."

Austin said that "Exploring new concepts, new materials and their interaction is essential to my work as a composer."

== Partial discography ==
- Leonard Bernstein Conducts Music of Our Time. New York Philharmonic, Columbia Masterworks, MS6733, 1965.
  - Improvisations for Orchestra and Jazz Soloists
- Robert Floyd Plays New Piano Music by Hans Werner Henze and Larry Austin, Advance Records, FGR10S, 1970.
  - Piano Set in Open Style
  - Piano Variations
- New Music for Woodwinds, Advance Records, FGR9S, 1974 (performed by Phil Rehfeldt, clarinet and Thomas Warburton, piano).
  - Current
- Larry Austin Hybrid Musics: Four Compositions, Canton, Texas: IRIDA Records 0022, 1980.
  - Maroon Bells
  - Catalogo Voce
  - Quadrants: Event/Complex No. 1
  - Second Fantasy on Ives' Universe Symphony
- Volume 1, CDCM Computer Music Series. Baton Rouge: Centaur Records, Inc., (CRC 2029) 1988.
  - Sinfonia Concertante (chamber orchestra conducted by Thomas Clark)
  - Sonata Concertante (performed by pianist Adam Wodicki)
- The Virtuoso in the Computer Age—I, Volume 10, CDCM Computer Music Series. Centaur Records, Inc., (CRC 2110) 1991.
  - Montage:Themes and Variations for Violin and Computer Music on Tape (1985)
- The Virtuoso in the Computer Age—III, Vol. 11, CDCM Computer Music Series, Baton Rouge: Centaur Records, 1993
  - La Barbara: The Name/The Sounds/The Music
- A Chance Operation: The John Cage Tribute. New York: Koch International Classics (KIC-CD-7238) 1993.
  - art is self-alteration is Cage is... (1983/93), performed by Robert Black
- Charles Ives's Universe Symphony, as realized and completed by Larry Austin (1974–93). Baton Rouge: Centaur Records, CRC 2205, 1994.
  - Charles Ives's Universe Symphony, as realized and completed by Larry Austin (1974–93)
- Composers in the Computer Age II. Baton Rouge: Centaur Records, CRC 2193, 1994.
  - SoundPoemSet (1990–91), computer music on tape.
- Tárogató, New York: Romeo Records (7212), 2001. Esther Lamneck, performer.
  - Tárogató
- UNconventional Trumpet, Camas, Washington: Crystal Records, CD763, 2004.
  - Charley's Cornet
