= Roger Reynolds =

American composer (born 1934)

- Roger Reynolds (2021)
- Born: July 18, 1934 (age 92); Detroit, Michigan, United States
- Education: University of Michigan
- Occupations: Composer, writer, performer
- Years active: 1957–present
- Website: rogerreynolds.com

Roger Lee Reynolds (born July 18, 1934) is an American composer. He is known for his capacity to integrate diverse ideas and resources, and for the seamless blending of traditional musical sounds with those newly enabled by technology. Beyond composition, his contributions to musical life include mentorship, algorithmic design, engagement with psychoacoustics, writing books and articles, and festival organization.

During his early career, Reynolds worked in Europe and Asia, returning to the US in 1969 to accept an appointment in the music department at the University of California, San Diego. His leadership there established it as a state of the art facility – in parallel with Stanford, IRCAM, and MIT – a center for composition and computer music exploration. Reynolds won early recognition with Fulbright, Guggenheim, National Endowment for the Arts, and National Institute of Arts and Letters awards. In 1989, he was awarded the Pulitzer Prize for a string orchestra composition, Whispers Out of Time, an extended work responding to John Ashbery’s ambitious Self-Portrait in a Convex Mirror. Reynolds is principal or co-author of five books and numerous journal articles and book chapters. In 2009 he was appointed University Professor, the first artist so honored by University of California. The Library of Congress established a Special Collection of his work in 1998.

His nearly 150 compositions to date are published exclusively by the C. F. Peters Corporation, (Edition Peters is now owned by the Wise Music Group as of April 2023) and several dozen CDs and DVDs of his work have been commercially released in the US and Europe. Performances by the Philadelphia, San Francisco, Los Angeles, and San Diego Symphonies, among others, preceded the most recent large-scale work, george WASHINGTON, written in honor of America's first president. This work knits together Reynolds's career-long interest in orchestra, text, extended musical forms, intermedia, and computer spatialization of sound.

Reynolds's work embodies an American artistic idealism reflecting the influence of Varèse and Cage, as well as Xenakis, and has also been compared with that of Boulez and Scelsi. Reynolds lives with his partner of 59 years, Karen, in Del Mar, California, overlooking the Pacific.

== Life and work ==
=== Beginnings and education (1934–1962) ===
==== Early influences: piano studies with Kenneth Aiken (1934–1952) ====
The seeds for Reynolds's focus on music were planted almost by accident when his father, an architect, recommended that he purchase some phonograph records. These recordings, including a Vladimir Horowitz performance of Frédéric Chopin's Polonaise in A-flat Major, Op. 53, spurred Reynolds to take up piano lessons with Kenneth Aiken. Aiken demanded that his students delve into the cultural context behind the works of classic keyboard literature they played. Around the time that Reynolds graduated from high school in 1952, he performed a solo recital in Detroit that consisted of the Johannes Brahms Piano Sonata No. 3 in F minor, Op. 5, some Intermezzi, the Franz Liszt Hungarian Rhapsody No. 6, as well as works by Claude Debussy, and Chopin. Reynolds remembers:

I don't recall public performance as being a particularly enjoyable experience. It served to bring what I cared about in music much closer than did mere phonographic idylls, but I did not, could not, feel that what was happening as I played was actually mine. It was not the applause that interested me, but the experience of the music itself.

==== University of Michigan: Engineering Physics (1952–1957) ====
Reynolds was uncertain about his prospects as a professional pianist, and entered the University of Michigan to study engineering physics, in line with his father's expectations. During what would be his first stint at the University of Michigan, he stayed connected to music and the arts because of the "virtual melting pot of disciplinary aspirations that then engaged him." Thomas Mann's Doctor Faustus and James Joyce's Portrait of the Artist as a Young Man both left marks upon his perception of music and the arts. "I ... consumed [Joyce's Portrait] hungrily, stayed in my dormitory room for weeks, feverish over the allure of its issues, not attending classes and only narrowly escaping academic disaster...". Reynolds received a B.S.E. in physics from the University of Michigan in 1957.

==== Systems Development Engineer and Military Policeman ====
After completing his undergraduate studies, he went to work in the missile industry for Marquardt Corporation. He moved to the Van Nuys neighborhood of Los Angeles, California, and worked as a systems development engineer. However, he quickly found that he was spending an inordinate amount of time practicing piano, and decided to go back to school to study music, with the goal of becoming a small liberal arts college teacher.

But prior to returning to school, Reynolds had a one-year obligation as a reservist in the military, which he fulfilled after his short time at Marquardt. As he recalls:

Knowing that I was an engineer, I presumed I would have been an Army engineer. But in fact my MSOs (military service obligations) were either light-truck driver or military policeman. So I chose military policeman, and I learned how to disable people and how to be extraordinarily brutal. It was a rather strange experience.

==== Return to University of Michigan: encounter with Ross Lee Finney ====
Reynolds returned to Ann Arbor in 1957, prepared to commit himself to life as a pianist. He was quickly diverted from this path upon encountering resident composer Ross Lee Finney, who introduced Reynolds to composition. Reynolds took a composition for non-composers class with Finney. At the end of the semester, Reynolds' string trio was performed for the class. According to Reynolds,

Finney just decimated it. ... I mean, everything about it, he destroyed. The sounds, the time, the pitches, the form, everything was wrong. I was chastened.

Despite the harsh introduction, Finney pulled Reynolds aside after the performance and recommended that he study composition with him over the summer. These summer lessons proved to be brutal. But when Reynolds was nearly ready to quit, at the end of the summer, Finney responded positively to what he brought in. Reynolds was engrossed by composing music, but he was still unsure what it meant to be a composer in America. He recalls that summer:

Although the process was by no means a smooth or an immediately encouraging one, by the time regular classes resumed in the fall of 1960 I was twenty-six, and I knew that I would do everything I could to become a composer. What did that actually mean? I have no recollection now of having had the slightest sense of what the life of a composer in America might involve.

Finney was particularly generous to Reynolds, programming three of his pieces on a Midwest Composers Symposium, something "unheard of" for student works. At these Midwest Composers Symposia, Reynolds also first encountered Harvey Sollberger, who would become a lifelong colleague and friend. From Finney, Reynolds learned of "the primacy of 'gesture,' which [Reynolds] took to be a composite of rhythm, contour, and physical energy: the empathic resonances that musical ideas could arouse—at root, perhaps, an American tendency to value sensation over analysis."

==== Composition studies with Roberto Gerhard ====
Subsequently, when the Spanish expatriate composer Roberto Gerhard came to Ann Arbor, Reynolds gravitated towards him:

I was captivated by the uncommon dimensionality of this man. Not only was he a superb musician and an inventive, even commanding composer of uncluttered, poised, and original music, but he was also both deeply intelligent and emotionally vulnerable. His susceptibility to injury, the outrage he displayed at ethical injustices, the touching warmth he offered from behind a vestigial Spanish crustiness these made an irresistible combination.

From Gerhard, Reynolds absorbed the idea that composition took "the whole man... you must put everything that you have and everything that you are into every musical act. And so where I live, who I interact with, what I hear, what the weather’s like, what my granddaughter says to me, and so on, they all affect the music."

==== Other early encounters; degrees conferred ====
During the later part of his composition studies at the University of Michigan, Reynolds also sought out encounters with other prominent musical personalities, including Milton Babbitt, Edgard Varèse, Nadia Boulanger, John Cage, and Harry Partch. Reynolds sought these composers outside of his academic studies:

It was outside class that I came upon and dug into the implications of Ives, Cage, Varèse and Partch. I sought out the last three and had personal contact with them. Perhaps it was the feeling of, if not exactly forbidden, then, certainly, "not favored" fruit that caused them to loom so large for me.

Reynolds met with Partch in 1958 in Yellow Springs, Ohio, at Antioch College, where he encountered a characteristic Antioch commandment: "'Examine your basic assumptions.'" Reynolds notes that such examination did not imply abandoning those assumptions.

During 1960, Reynolds met with both Varèse and Cage in New York (and the latter again in 1961 in Ann Arbor), with Babbitt in Ann Arbor in 1960, and with Nadia Boulanger in Ann Arbor in 1961.

During this time, Reynolds also composed The Emperor of Ice Cream (1961-1962), which combined aspects of music and theater, and contained many of the features of his later music. It was composed for the ONCE festivals, but was actually premiered later, in 1965, in Rome.

Reynolds received a second bachelor's degree in music in 1960 and an M.Mus. in composition in 1961.

==== ONCE Festivals 1961–1963 ====
Reynolds co-founded the ONCE Group in Ann Arbor with Robert Ashley and Gordon Mumma, and was active in the first three festivals in 1961 to 1963. Other important figures in these festivals included George Cacioppo, Donald Scavarda, Bruce Wise, filmmaker George Manupelli, and later, "Blue" Gene Tyranny. The ONCE Festival was probably the most significant nexus of avant-garde performance art and music in the Midwest in the early 1960s, with programs consisting of both American Experimentalism and European Modernism. Reynolds recalls:

I think the primary force in the beginning was Bob and Mary Ashley. Bob had been studying at the University of Michigan with Ross Finney. ... [Ashley] had [previously] been at the Manhattan School of Music; he was a pianist at that time. He was very intense and very rebellious in some regards. [Gordon] Mumma had been at Michigan but had dropped out and was working in some kind of research dealing with seismographic measurement... The two of them had become involved with a [visual] art professor named Milton Cohen, who had what he called a Space Theatre where he had taken canvas and stretched it to make a circular, tent-like situation ... in the middle there were projectors and mirrors which flashed imagery on the [surrounding] screens. Bob and Gordon had been involved in making electronic music in relation to Cohen’s [Space Theatre]. ...they realized that if they started a festival, they were going to need resources... I think that I came into the picture partly in that way. ... So there was a confluence of capacity, differential abilities, and common interest.

In 1963, C.F. Peters offered to publish Reynolds's work, a relationship which has been exclusive since that day.

=== Early career: travels abroad and to California (1962–1969) ===
==== Europe: Germany, France and Italy ====
After he left Ann Arbor the second time, Reynolds traveled throughout Europe with his partner Karen, a flutist. They visited Germany, France and then Italy with Fulbright, Guggenheim and Rockefeller support. This sojourn to Europe served as a way for Reynolds to find his voice as a composer:

The idea was to get out and to have the time to do the kind of growing that I thought I needed to do, because I had composed very few pieces by the time I had graduated from the University of Michigan. So at that time—although it seems odd now—going to Europe was a way of living cheaply. I lived in Europe for almost three years on nothing and with nothing, and that time was spent trying to find myself and my voice.

It emerged later that Philip Glass was in Paris during a similar period and living in the same way.

Before Paris, Reynolds had gone to Germany to study with Bernd Alois Zimmermann in Cologne, on a Fulbright Scholarship in 1962/1963. But things did not turn out the way he expected:

I was supposed to study with Zimmermann. I went to his class. And afterwards he took me to coffee and he said, “Look, there's no point for you to be in this class.” He didn't say why but he said, “Just do what you want, come back and see me at the end, and I'll sign off.” So I actually never met with him, never had a lesson with him, never even had a conversation with him.

Instead, Reynolds worked with Gottfried Michael Koenig, and collaborated with Michael von Biel, who was living in the atelier of Karlheinz Stockhausen's friend Mary Bauermeister. Reynolds worked at the West German Radio's Electronic Music Studio, where he completed A Portrait of Vanzetti (1963).

The following academic year, 1963-1964, Karen received a Fulbright to study in Paris, although, ironically, one of the most influential moments during that year for Reynolds was in Berlin. He and Karen traveled there to meet Elliott Carter, and heard his Double Concerto while there. Reynolds was particularly struck by the spatial elements in the piece. This influenced his own composition Quick Are the Mouths of Earth (1964–1965).

Throughout their years in Europe, despite their lack of funding, Roger and Karen curated and performed in several contemporary music concerts in Paris and Italy.

==== Japan ====
Reynolds accepted a fellowship from the Institute of Current World Affairs, which took him and Karen to Japan from 1966 to 1969. In Japan the Reynoldses organized the intermedia series CROSS TALK INTERMEDIA, which in 1969 culminated in a three-day festival in Kenzo Tangei's Olympic Gymnasium. He also met and became friends with composers Toru Takemitsu, Joji Yuasa, pianist Yūji Takahashi, electronics specialist Junosuke Okuyama, critic Kuniharu Akiyama, painter Keiji Usami and theatre director Tadashi Suzuki.

Reynolds' most significant work from his time in Japan was probably PING (1968), a multimedia composition for piano, flute, percussion, harmonium, live electronic sound, film, and visual effects, based on a text by Samuel Beckett. For the work he collaborated with Butoh dancer Sekiji Maro, cinematographer Kazuro Kato, who had previously worked as a cameraman for Akira Kurosawa, and Karen, who devised a strategy for projecting the Beckett text.

==== California ====
Roger and Karen were visiting the Seattle Symphony during 1965 with sponsorship from the Rockefeller Foundation. A trip down the West Coast to visit various university music programs was suggested by the foundation's Arts Officer, Howard Klein. The last stop on that trip was at the still young University of California, San Diego campus, in La Jolla. The nascent music life at this University was viewed with much promise:

We thought that the most dynamic social scene at that point – this was the late ’60s – was California, and so that's where we went [when returning to the U.S.]. But there was not much in San Diego at that time. It was primarily a Navy town. There was a fledgling unit of the University of California ... it was an open playing field, so the possibility of doing things was very great. ... Partch was [also] in San Diego. That wasn't a reason to go there, but it was certainly an attraction after we got there.

=== University of California, San Diego (1969–present) ===
Several years after their visit to La Jolla, Will Ogdon, then UCSD's Department of Music chair, invited the Reynolds back to the area, offering Reynolds a position as a tenured associate professor. He began work on establishing what became the Center for Music Experiment and Related Research in 1971, an organized research unit that later evolved into the Center for Research in Computing and the Arts. As was the case with the San Francisco Tape Music Center, the initial funding for CME came from the Rockefeller Foundation.

While at UCSD, Reynolds has taught courses on Music Notation, Extended Vocal Techniques, Late Beethoven Works, Text (in relation to the Red Act Project and Greek Drama), Collaboration (co-taught with Steven Schick), Extending Varèse (also co-taught with Steven Schick), and the Perils of Large Scale Form (co-taught with Chinary Ung), musical analysis, as well as private and group composition lessons.

After his arrival at the University of California, his interests diverged into several concurrently evolving paths. Thus, it is easier to talk about his work from this point based on common features between works.

=== Work ===
Reynolds has addressed the European musical tradition with three symphonies, four concertos and five string quartets, works that have been performed internationally as well as in North America.

==== Influence of technology ====
Aside from the traditional instruments of the Western Classical orchestra, Reynolds worked extensively with analog and digital electronic sound, typically employed to bolster the form and timbral richness of his works.

==== CCRMA ====
In the late 1970s, John Chowning invited Reynolds to come to Stanford's summer courses at the Center for Computing Research in Music and Acoustics (CCRMA). Because of the expense of computer equipment, electroacoustic work was done very differently at that time:

...[W]hen I went to Stanford to start working in computers at the end of the ’70s, I worked with a lot of different people there who were around the lab, because this was at a time when the so-called time-sharing machines meant that everyone in the building heard what everyone else was doing and everyone was involved with everyone else. So if something wasn't working you just asked the person sitting next to you [for help] and you'd work it out together.

At CCRMA, Reynolds finished the sound synthesis portion of ...the serpent-snapping eye... (1978) (uses FM Synthesis) and VOICESPACE IV: The Palace (1978–80) (uses digital signal processing).

==== IRCAM ====
Shortly after his involvement at CCRMA, the French Institut de Recherche et Coordination Acoustique/Musique (IRCAM) offered Reynolds a commission and residency, which was followed up by two more residences over the course of two decades. When he first went to IRCAM, he made the choice to utilize technologically expert assistants to create software or hardware solutions to specific musical ideas inherent in his compositions. This practice has since spawned many collaborative ventures with various musical assistants, as Reynolds notes:

When I went to IRCAM ... there was this concept of the Musical Assistant. ... I realized right away that this allowed me to make a choice: whether I would decide to spend a few years not composing and learning what I would need to do to become a self-sufficient computer-music composer or that I was going to collaborate with other people.

[On collaboration:] You enter into a relationship with one or more people and you have to sacrifice some of your autonomy and they have to sacrifice some of theirs in order to get to a place that you couldn’t get without each other. And I like that kind of situation.

Archipelago (1982–83) was one of the first works that Reynolds did that used technology to drastically alter not only the sounds of the composition, but also the process of composing. The impetus was as the title suggests, a chain of islands, an idea which Reynolds elaborated on with a layered theme and variations process. With fifteen themes and their own variations, distributed unevenly over sub-groups of a thirty-two member chamber orchestra, Reynolds needed technology to transform both the timbres and the intricate fragmentation and reordering of the sounds in ways that live performers could not. This was the first time that Reynolds spent extended periods of time working with computers to transform musical material, along with spatialization. IRCAM was an extremely fertile environment for compositional innovation, allowing the Archipelago project to thrive:

...[T]he process [of composing the piece] was interactive because I was at IRCAM and had the privilege of working with a very smart young composer, Thierry Lancino, who was my musical assistant, and also consulting with people like David Wessel and Stephen McAdams and so on. It was an astonishing opportunity. But in this case, the tie between the impetus, the medium, and the need for technology was absolutely clear. If one listens to the piece, one hears that [technology] was needed and also that it works.

Odyssey (1989–93), primarily composed during the early 1990s, incorporates two singers, two speakers, instrumental ensemble, and six-channel computer sound. "Odyssey required me to settle on an ideal set of multilingual Beckett texts by means of which to portray the course of his life." There was a chaotic element in the text that Reynolds wished to portray in the music, and he undertook some of the first experiments with using strange attractors (specifically the Lorenz attractor) in music with this composition, citing influence from James Gleick. Reynolds notes that the process of creating musically beguiling results from a strange attractor was "arduous" and "grueling."

His last work at IRCAM, The Angel of Death (1998–2001), for solo piano, chamber orchestra, and 6-channel computer processed sound, was written with a substantial number of perceptual psychologists assisting and analyzing both the planning and the end results. His assistant on the project was Frédérique Voisin, and the principal psychologists were Steven McAdams (IRCAM) and Emannuel Bigand (University of Bourgone). The end results included a special issue of the journal Music Perception, edited by Daniel Levitin, an audio CD / CDROM publication by IRCAM, along with a day-long conference in Sydney, Australia.

==== UPIC (1983–84) ====
Shortly after his first trip to IRCAM, he was also invited to compose a work using the Les Ateliers UPIC System, which Iannis Xenakis had created for Mycenae Alpha (1978). This engagement resulted in Ariadne's Thread for string quartet and UPIC sound.

==== SANCTUARY (2003–07) ====
A composer-in-residence appointment at the California Institute for Telecommunications and Information Technology (at UCSD) allowed Reynolds to finish his SANCTUARY project: an evening-length, four-movement piece for percussion quartet and real-time computer transformations. The completed work was premiered in 2007 at I.M. Pei’s National Gallery of Art, and later the same year repeated in the courtyard of the Salk Institute in La Jolla. The DVD that arose from this project was intended to alter the way contemporary classical music is received, because of the intimacy with which the performers knew the work and the audio-visual complexity with which it was presented. Steven Schick and red fish blue fish had been working on the piece for five years by the time the DVD was recorded. Ross Karre prepared a complexly scripted editing plan. The embodied experience that such intimacy breeds is very important to Reynolds:

A lot of our experience with music is empathic – that is, we, our bodies, our sensibilities, identify with and respond to, even literally move with the physicality of the sounds that are generating the musical experience. ... [The immersion of the performers in a work] allows our empathy as listeners to flow out and extend and commit. We see that the performers are really engaged and we get engaged; we trust them.

==== imAge/imagE (2000-) ====
Around 2000, Reynolds began writing a series of short, complementary solos, entitled, for example, imagE/guitar and imAge/guitar. The “E” is more elegiac and evocative, the “A”, assertive and angular. As his interest in algorithmic transformation migrated towards real-time performance interaction, Reynolds produced a series of extended compositions using the materials of a solo pair as his thematic resource. Dream Mirror, for guitar and computer musician, is a duo whose internal sections are framed by completely notated music, but move into a collaboratively improvisational interaction within these frames.

The improvisatory interactions are algorithmically driven, with the soloist and computer musician interacting flexibly, but under well-defined conditions. Both Dream Mirror, for guitarist Pablo Gómez-Cano, and MARKed MUSIC, for contrabassist Mark Dresser, involved close collaboration with computer musician, Jaime Oliver. Toward Another World: LAMENT (2010-2017) for clarinet and computer musician, as well as similar duos involving violin (Shifting/Drifting) and cello (PERSISTENCE) followed.

When composing Shifting/Drifting, Reynolds worked closely with his frequent violin collaborator Irvine Arditti on the acoustic material, and computer musician Paul Hembree on the electronic sound. The French classical music periodical Diapason (magazine) described the piece as:

Un espace aussi artificiel que vaste apporte une sensation de distance et de perspective assez vertigineuse. Le rendu sonore global frappe par l’expansion du lyrisme et d’une virtuosité violonistique qui prend en quelque sorte racine chez Bach (la Chaconne de la Partita no 2 fait d’ailleurs une apparition masquée)... (English: A space as artificial as it is vast brings a rather dizzying sensation of distance and perspective. The overall sound rendering is striking by the expansion of lyricism and a violin virtuosity which takes root, in a way, in Bach (the Chaconne from Partita no. 2 also makes a hidden appearance)...)

==== KNOWING / NOT KNOWING ====
During 2012-24, Reynolds worked on developing an elaborate, 90-minute multimedia work concerned with the emergence of Knowledge. Premiered at UC San Diego's Park and Market facility in downtown San Diego on 17 March 2025, it involves the following resources: an a cappella chorus, an actor, two percussionists (one live, the other on film), and a trombonist. Nine sections evolve from I. INFANCY / INDIVIDUATION to X. COMMUNALITY / KNOWLEDGE. There is also a tenth section insert involving a “Kaleidoscopic Chorus” made up of eight local community members who voice their own aphoristic ideas in relation to the work’s subject. Both live and films versions of materials are used, along with lighting and staging to enlarge to experience and its subject matter. Spatialized, computer-processed sounds (particularly, novel “fragmented drones”) are a constant presence.

==== Influence of literature and poetry ====
Text has been an important resource for Reynolds's work, in particular, the poetry of Beckett, Borges, Stevens, and John Ashbery. Since the mid-1970s he has been engaged with the use of language as sound, "the ways in which a vocalist's manner of utterance – whether spoken, declaimed, sung, or indebted to some uncommon mode of production" affect the experience of the ideas that the text carries. Reynolds was stimulated by his UCSD colleagues Kenneth Gaburo and baritone Philip Larson, deploying extended vocal techniques, such as "vocal-fry" in the VOICESPACE works (quadraphonic tape compositions): Still (1975), A Merciful Coincidence (1976), Eclipse (1979), and The Palace (1980). The VOICESPACE works also involve the intricate spatialization of both the voices and computer-generated sounds.

While serving as Valentine Visiting Professor at Amherst College in the late 1980s, Reynolds immersed himself in poetry because of the connection of Amherst with poet Emily Dickinson. He came across John Ashbery's Self-Portrait a Convex Mirror (1974) while reading one evening:

The next morning I realized that things that I had understood the night before I couldn't understand the next morning. In other words, there was something time specific about comprehension. ... That was very interesting. What usually happens when something like that occurs is that I want to write music about it, and so I decided to do a string orchestra piece.

This string orchestra piece, Whispers Out of Time, was premiered in 1988 in Amherst, and won the Pulitzer Prize for Music in 1989. Reynolds later worked collaboratively with John Ashbery on the seventy-minute song cycle last things, I think, to think about (1994), which uses a spatialized recording of the poet speaking.

==== Influence of visual arts ====
Visual art has provided Reynolds with inspiration for several works, such as the Symphony [The Stages of Life] (1991–92), which drew from self-portraits by Rembrandt and Picasso, and Visions (1991), a string quartet that responded to Bruegel. A later project involving visual art was The Image Machine (2005), which arose from rather elaborate interdisciplinary collaboration called 22, headed by Thanassis Rikakis, then at Arizona State University. This large-scale work involved motion capture of a dancer, to be used as a control element:

At the center of this project was the idea that it would be possible to capture the complex motion [of a dancer] in real time, and to have a computer model and then monitor the motion in such a way that it could send control information to other artists who would create parallel and deeply responsive elements to a larger performance totality.

Reynolds worked with choreographer Bill T. Jones, clarinetist Anthony Burr, and percussionist Steven Schick on the project, along with audio software designers Pei Xiang and Peter Otto, and visual rendering artists Paul Kaiser, Shelley Eshkar, and Marc Downie. The process was not necessarily tranquil, though it was rewarding, as Reynolds recalls:

We achieved a meld of media, high technology, and aesthetic force unequaled by anything else I had experienced. The process was not smooth. In fact it was sometimes destructively rancorous. None-the-less, the product of long effort and mutual adjustment, one component resource to the other, showed vividly and thrillingly what one of art's futures might be.

Among the audio software resources created for 22 was MATRIX, a new algorithm designed by Reynolds which he has used since on various projects.

==== Influence of mythology ====
Myth has been an important resource for Reynolds's work, as evident in the title of his second symphony: Symphony [Myths] (1990). Later, this mythological preoccupation grew into the Red Act Project, the first installment of which was commissioned by the British Broadcasting Corporation. This piece, The Red Act Arias, was premiered at the 1997 Proms, animating text from Aeschylus with narrator, choir, orchestra and eight channel electronic sound.

Perhaps the most powerful impression any narrative text has ever left on me, though, is that inscribed by Aeschylus in Agamemnon, the first play of the Oresteia trilogy. Again, there is an intersection of intellectual implication, moving narrative, associations through imagery and oppositions that is magnetic. Nevertheless, it is the flow of the language itself as rendered into English by Richmond Lattimore that cemented my resolve to embark upon the Red Act Project. I [was] engaged with it for more than a decade.

Responding to related texts, Reynolds produced Justice (1999-2001), commissioned by the Library of Congress, and Illusion (2006), commissioned by the Los Angeles Philharmonic with funding from the Koussevitsky and Rockefeller foundations.

==== Space: metaphoric, auditory, architectural ====
Reynolds has been involved with the concept of Space as a potential musical resource for most of his career, leading to a reputation that rests, in part, upon his "wizardry in sending music flying through space: whether vocal, instrumental, or computerized". This signature feature first appeared in the notationally innovative theater piece, The Emperor of Ice Cream (1961–62). In this work, Reynolds sought to bring conceptual elements in the text to the fore with the aid of spatial movement of sound.

I began my own efforts to address space in modest fashion, in a music-theater composition [The Emperor of Ice Cream] intended for the ONCE Festivals but not actually premiered until 1965 in the context of the Nuova Consonanza Festival of Franco Evangelisti's, in Rome. ... So, in the case of [Wallace] Stevens's line "And spread it so as to cover her face," the eight singers, arrayed across the front of the stage, pass the phonemes of the associated melodic phrase back and forth by fading in and out successively.

Later, in Japan, Reynolds worked with engineer Junosuke Okuyama to build a "photo-cell sound distributor," which used a matrix of photoelectric cells to move sounds around a quadraphonic setup, with the aid of a flashlight as a kind of controller. This device was used in the multimedia composition PING (1968). More recently, Reynolds's Mode Records Watershed (1998) DVD was the first such disc to feature music conceived specifically for discrete multichannel presentation in Dolby Digital 5.1.

I wrote a piece, Watershed IV, for percussionist Steven Schick, which involved the very fundamental conceit that he was centered within an instrumental array. The idea was that the audience would be put in there with him, metaphorically. There would be speakers surrounding the audience that would reproduce, at some level, for the listener, the experience that Steve was having within his array of instruments. Steve and I worked almost a year on the setup for that piece, playing with different spiral arrangements and numbers of instruments and different geometries.

He is concerned not only with the physical locations of sound sources around a listener, but also metaphoric notions of space. As he notes, "'Space' can signify a physical framework by means of which we comprehend the conditions of the 'real world' around us, but it can also become a referential tool that helps us to place into relative and often revelatory relationships other less objectively characterizable data."

In addition to the auditory effects of spatial location and metaphoric notions of space, Reynolds has responded to various architectural spaces, creating works explicitly for performance in various buildings, including Arata Isozaki's Art Tower Mito and also his Gran Ship, Kenzō Tange's Olympic Gymnasium in Tokyo, Louis I. Kahn's Salk Institute, Frank Lloyd Wright's Guggenheim Museum, Christian de Portzamparc's Cité de la Musique, Frank Gehry's Walt Disney Concert Hall, the Royal Albert Hall, and the Great Hall of the Library of Congress, the Kennedy Center, I.M. Pei's East Wing of the National Gallery of Art. Reynolds adapts his use of spatial audio to the performance space.

Gradually it became clear that blunter tools can work to greater advantage in large spaces with comparatively larger audiences. In composing The Red Act Arias for performance in London's cavernous, 6,000-seat Royal Albert Hall, for example, I decided to use a multileveled system with eight groups of loudspeakers. Rather than attempting to position sounds precisely on perceivable paths around the hall, I concentrated on broad, sweeping gestures that surged across or around the performance space in unmistakable fashion.

==== Other series of works ====
From the 1970s, when he produced the five VOICESPACE works, Reynolds has been interested in generating series of related works. He has performed multiple presentations of PASSAGE events (involving the reading and spatialization of original texts, projected images, and live performances), composed seven complementary pairs of imagE/ and imAge/ solo works, and, most recently, six works belonging to the “SHARESPACE” series of duos for individual instruments and computer musicians.

==== Collaboration ====
WISDOM’s Sources is a collaboration with violinist Irvine Arditti and violist Ralf Ehlers. The piece is in three sections that address the origins of wisdom: dedicated, in turn, to Aeschylus, to the Buddhist THIRUKKAL and to WEB Dubois. This work, developed over three years, was conceived from the outset as a film. Filmmaker Kyle Johnson filmed the performers over three days and subsequently edited this footage collaboratively with the composer. The film evolves from abstract imagery (not unrelated to Kandinsky’s experiments exploring the possibility of replacing form with color during the 1910s) through a gradual emergence of the performers’ hands, bows, and the faces, so that, in the final minutes of this 36-minute experience, the viewer has an intimate connectivity with the musicians’s faces, revealing their individual investment in their performances.

In part, as a result of the KNOWING / NOT KNOWING experience, Reynolds began, in 2019, to work more explicitly with performers, such that they were, at a significant level, contributors to the resulting works. This was true earlier with Irvine Arditti’s solo violin works, and with baritone Jonathan Nussman in “DICKINSON”, but became more specifically interactive with the solo percussion work SLIGHT of HAND (2023-25), created with percussionist Kosuke Matsuda, and ARTICULATE CIRCLES (2023-25), with percussionist Aiyun Huang.

==== Mentorship, research and writing ====
In addition to his compositional activities, Reynolds's academic career has taken him to Europe, the Nordic countries, South America, Asia, Mexico and the United States, where he has lectured, organized events, and taught. Though his focus has been on the Music Department at UCSD, Reynolds has occupied visiting positions at various universities: the University of Illinois (Champaign–Urbana, IL, Spring 1971), CUNY-Brooklyn College (Spring 1985), the Peabody Institute of Johns Hopkins University, Yale University (Spring 1982), Amherst College (Fall 1988), and at Harvard University as Fromm Visiting Professor (Fall 2013). In his role as a UC University Professor, Reynolds was artist-in-residence and taught courses at University of California, Washington Center, the University of California’s Washington, DC campus (2010–2015). Reynolds continues to mentor student in the University of California’s Department of Music as of 2025.

At the University of Illinois, Reynolds wrote his first book, Mind Models: New Forms of Musical Experience (1975). It covers a wide range of topics concerning the contemporary world and the role of art in that world, specific considerations of the materials of music, and the way those materials are shaped by contemporary composers.

At the time that Mind Models first appeared in print, no one else had attempted to rigorously define the issues raised by those composers who broke most deliberately with traditional European practice. ... Reynolds was the first to clearly identify and consolidate into a single framework the vast array of forces (cultural, political, perceptual, and technical) shaping this heterogeneous body of work.

Reynolds wrote A Searcher's Path (1987) while serving as visiting professor at CUNY – Brooklyn College, and Form and Method: Composing Music while serving as Randolph Rothschild Guest Composer at the Peabody Conservatory of Johns Hopkins University. The later closely details Reynolds's compositional process. In addition to his books, he has written articles for periodicals including Perspectives of New Music, the Contemporary Music Review, Polyphone, Inharmoniques, The Musical Quarterly, American Music, Music Perception, and Nature.

Reynolds has also written two additional books collaboratively with his partner Karen Reynolds, PASSAGE (2017) and Xenakis Creates in Architecture and Music: The Reynolds Desert House (2022).

The monograph Xenakis Creates in Architecture and Music: The Reynolds Desert House provides a detailed picture of the Reynolds’s relationship over several decades with Iannis and François Xenakis, as well, more particularly, as Xenakis’s creation of plans for an eventual Reynolds dwelling in the Anza-Borrego desert, east of Del Mar. The book contains abundant sketches and letters from Xenakis, and an examination of the interesting interplay between Xenakis’s approaches to the creation of both music and architectural projects as well.

PASSAGE contains 80 texts written by Reynolds, and a wealth of related images. This book, also involving the expertise of Stacy Birky Greene, is an art book that investigates what Reynolds refers to as “textual viscosity.” Each text has its own font, point size and layout on the page. Diagrams and colored images are often overlaid with text so that the individual letters and lines of a text may be brought into close relationships with the overlaid imagery. The basic idea of viscosity explores the fact that, as the visual imagery grows more complex, one has to exert unusual attention to grasp meanings. If the text is more straightforward, it bypasses such visual intricacies. Subject areas include ideas, memorable experiences, notable individuals (Cage, Takemitsu, Arditti, Xenakis, etc.) places (Giverny or the Mediterranean). Published by C.F. Peters, the book was specially printed in England.

In addition to visiting teaching positions, Reynolds has also given master classes around the world, in places such as Buenos Aires, Thessaloniki, Porto Alegre, IRCAM, Warsaw, the Sibelius Academy in Helsinki, and the Central Conservatory of Music in Beijing. Furthermore, he has been a featured composer at numerous music festivals, including Music Today and the Suntory International Program in Japan, the Edinburgh and Proms festivals in the United Kingdom, the Helsinki and Zagreb biennales, the Darmstädter Ferienkurse, New Music Concerts (Toronto), Warsaw Autumn, Why Note? (Dijon), musica viva (Munich), the Agora Festival (Paris), various ISCM festivals, and the New York Philharmonic's Horizons.

== Discography ==
- MUSIC FROM THE ONCE FESTIVAL 1961–1966 (1966) – New World 80567-2 (5 CDs)
  Epigram and Evolution (1960, piano)
  Wedge (1961, chamber ensemble)
  Mosaic (1962, flute and piano)
  A Portrait of Vanzetti (1962–63, narrator, ensemble, and tape)
- ROGER REYNOLDS: VOICESPACE (1980) – Lovely Music LCD 1801
  The Palace (Voicespace IV) (1980, baritone and tape)
  Eclipse (Voicespace III) (1979, tape)
  Still (Voicespace I) (1975, tape)
- ROGER REYNOLDS: ALL KNOWN ALL WHITE (1984) – Pogus P21025-2
  …the serpent-snapping eye (1978, trumpet, percussion, piano, and tape)
  Ping (1968, piano, flute, percussion, and live electronics)
  Traces (1969, flute, piano, cello, and live electronics)
- ROGER REYNOLDS: DISTANT IMAGES (1987) – Lovely Music VR 1803 7-4529-51803-1-9
  Less than Two (1976–79, two pianos, two percussionists, and tape)
  Aether (1983, violin and piano)
- NEW MUSIC SERIES: VOLUME 2 (1988) – Neuma Records 45072
  Autumn Island (1986, for marimba)
- ARDITTI (1989) – Gramavision R2 79440
  Coconino … a shattered landscape (1985, for string quartet)
- COMPUTER MUSIC CURRENTS 4 (1989) – Wergo WER 2024-50
  The Vanity of Words (1986, for computer processed vocal sounds)
- ROGER REYNOLDS (1989) – New World 80401-2
  Whispers Out of Time (1988, string orchestra)
  Transfigured Wind II (1983, flute, orchestra, and tape)
- ELECTRO ACOUSTIC MUSIC: CLASSICS (1990) – Neuma Records 450-74
  Transfigured Wind IV (1985, flute and tape)
- ROGER REYNOLDS (1990) – Neuma Records 450-78
  Personae (1990, violin, ensemble, and tape)
  The Vanity of Words [Voicespace V] (1986, tape)
  Variation (1988, piano)
- ROGER REYNOLDS: SOUND ENCOUNTERS (1990) – GM Recordings GM2039CD
  Roger Reynolds: The Dream of Infinite Rooms (1986, cello, orchestra, and tape)
- ROGER REYNOLDS: ELECTROACOUSTIC MUSIC (1991) – New World 80431-2
  The Ivanov Suite (1991, tape)
  Versions/Stages (1988–91, tape)
- ROGER REYNOLDS: SONOR ENSEMBLE (1993) – Composers Recordings, Inc. / Anthology of Recorded Music, Inc. NWCR652
  Not Only Night (1988, soprano, flute, clarinet, violin, cello, piano)
- ROGER REYNOLDS: THE PARIS PIECES (1995) – Neuma Records 450-91 (2 CD)
  Odyssey (1989–92, two singers, ensemble, and computer sound)
  Summer Island (1984, oboe and computer sound)
  Archipelago (1982–83, ensemble and computer sound)
  Autumn Island (1986, marimba)
  Fantasy for Pianist (1964, piano)
- ROGER REYNOLDS (1996) – Montaigne 782083 (2 CD)
  Coconino... a shattered landscape (1985, revised 1993, string quartet)
  Visions (1991, string quartet)
  Kokoro (1992, solo violin)
  Ariadne's Thread (1994, string quartet)
  Focus a beam, emptied of thinking, outward... (1989, solo cello)
- ROGER REYNOLDS: FROM BEHIND THE UNREASONING MASK (1998) – New World 80237-2
  From Behind the Unreasoning Mask (1975, trombone, percussion, and tape)
- ROGER REYNOLDS: WATERSHED (1998) – mode 70 DVD
  Watershed IV (1995, percussion and real-time sound spatialization)
  Eclipse (1979, computer generated and processed sound)
  The Red Act Arias [excerpt] (1997, for 8-channel computer sound)
- STEVEN SCHICK: DRUMMING IN THE DARK (1998) – Neuma Records 450-100
  Watershed I (1995, solo percussion)
- ROGER REYNOLDS: THREE CIRCUITOUS PATHS (2002) – Neuma Records 450-102
  Transfigured Wind III (1984, flute, ensemble, and tape)
  Ambages (1965, flute)
  Mistral (1985, chamber ensemble)
- ROGER REYNOLDS: LAST THINGS, I THINK, TO THINK ABOUT (2002) – EMF CD 044
  last things, I think, to think about (1994, baritone, piano, and tape)
- FLUE (2003) – Einstein Records EIN 021
  ...brain ablaze... she howled aloud (2000–2003, one, two or three piccolos, computer processed sound, and real time spatialization)
- ROGER REYNOLDS: PROCESS AND PASSION (2004) – Pogus P21032-2 (2 CD)
  Kokoro (1992, violin)
  Focus a beam, emptied of thinking, outward... (1989, cello)
  Process and Passion (2002, violin, cello, and computer processed sound)
- ROGER REYNOLDS: WHISPERS OUT OF TIME [works for orchestra] (2007) – mode 183
  Symphony [Myths] (1990, orchestra)
  Whispers Out of Time (1988, orchestra)
  Symphony [Vertigo] (1987, orchestra, and computer processed sound)
- ANTARES PLAYS WORKS BY PETER LIEBERSON AND ROGER REYNOLDS (2009) – New Focus Recordings FCR112
  Shadowed Narrative (1978–81, clarinet, violin, cello, piano)
- EPIGRAM AND EVOLUTION: COMPLETE PIANO WORKS OF ROGER REYNOLDS (2009) – mode 212/213
  Fantasy for Pianist (1964, piano)
  imAge/piano (2007, piano)
  Epigram and Evolution (1960, piano)
  Variation (1988, piano)
  imagE/piano (2007, piano)
  Traces (1968, flute, piano, live electronics)
  Less than Two (1978, for 2 pianos, 2 percussionists and computer processed sound)
  The Angel of Death (1998–2001, piano, chamber orchestra and computer processed sound)
- MARK DRESSER: GUTS (2010) – Kadima Collective Recordings Triptych Series
  imAge/contrabass and imagE/contrabass (2008–2010)
- ROGER REYNOLDS: SANCTUARY (2011) – mode 232/33 DVD
  Sanctuary (2003 – 2007, percussion quartet & live electronics)
- ROGER REYNOLDS: VIOLIN WORKS (2022) – BMOP/Sound 1086
  Personae (1989-1990, solo violin and chamber ensemble with computer processed sound)
  Kokoro (1991-1992, solo violin)
  Aspiration (2004-2005, solo violin and chamber orchestra)
- ROGER REYNOLDS: ASPIRATION (2022) – Kairos 0015051KAI
  Shifting/Drifting (2015, solo violin, real-time algorithmic transformation)
  imagE/violin & imAge/violin (2015, solo violin)
  Aspiration (2004-2005, solo violin and chamber orchestra)
  Kokoro (1991-1992, solo violin)
- ROGER REYNOLDS: ASPIRATION (2022) – Kairos 0015051KAI
  Shifting/Drifting (2015, solo violin, real-time algorithmic transformation)
  imagE/violin & imAge/violin (2015, solo violin)
  Aspiration (2004-2005, solo violin and chamber orchestra)
  Kokoro (1991-1992, solo violin)
- ROGER REYNOLDS: THE imagE-imAge SET (2022) - Neuma 450-114
  imAge/piano & imagE/piano (2007-2008, solo piano)
  imAge/contrabass & imagE/contrabass (2008-2010, solo contrabass)
  imAge/guitar & imagE/guitar (2009, solo guitar)
  imagE/viola & imAge/viola (2012-2014, solo viola)
  imagE/flute & imAge/flute (2009-2014, solo flute)
  imagE/cello & imAge/cello (2007, solo cello)
- ROGER REYNOLDS: COMPLETE CELLO WORKS (2014) - mode 277-278
  Thoughts, Places, Dreams (2013, solo cello and chamber orchestra)
  Colombi Daydream (2010, solo cello)
  Focus a beam, emptied of thinking, outward... (1989, solo cello)
  imagE/cello & imAge/cello (2007, solo cello)
  Process and Passion (2002, violin, cello and computer processed sound)
  A Crimson Path (2000-2002, cello and piano)
- ROGER REYNOLDS: ROGER REYNOLDS AT 85, VOL 1 (2020) - mode 326
  FLiGHT (2012-2016, string quartet)
  not forgotten (2007-2010, string quartet)
- ROGER REYNOLDS: ROGER REYNOLDS AT 85, VOL 2 (2021) - mode 329
  Piano Etudes: Books I & II (2010–17, solo piano)
- Roger Reynolds: Wind Concertos (Ekkozone 04, April 2024)
  JOURNEY (2023, solo oboe and chamber orchestra)
  Transfigured Wind III (1984, solo flute, chamber orchestra, and computer-processed sound)
- The Promises of Darkness (Ekkozone 05, March 2025)
  The Promises of Darkness (1975, ensemble of 11 players)
  Mistral (1985, ensemble of 13 players)
  Dionysus (1990, ensemble of 8 players)
  Positings (2013, flute/piccolo, horn, violin, cello, piano/percussion, and computer-processed sound)
- WISDOM's Sources / 'O'o (Ekkozone 06, March 2026)
  WISDOM's Sources (2024, violin and viola)
  'O'o (2018, flute, two violins, viola, and cello)
