= Rodney Waschka II =

American composer

Rodney Waschka II is an American composer known for his algorithmic compositions and his theatrical works.

== Biography ==
Waschka studied at Brooklyn College, at the Institute of Sonology, then newly part of the Royal Conservatory of The Hague, and earned his doctorate at the University of North Texas. His teachers include Larry Austin at the University of North Texas, Charles Dodge (composer) at Brooklyn College, and Paul Berg, Clarence Barlow, Joel Ryan and George Lewis (trombonist) at the Royal Conservatory of The Hague. He also studied with Robert Ashley.

His music has been performed throughout the world including numerous instances at the annual International Computer Music Conference, at the Society for Electro-Acoustic Music in the US festival, at the World Saxophone Congress in Montreal, and various other venues including Merkin Concert Hall in New York, the Sheremetev Palace and Glinka Hall in St. Petersburg, Russia, the International Review of Composers in Belgrade, the Purcell Room in London, Hong Kong City Hall, and the Museo Reina Sofia in Madrid.

Currently, Rodney Waschka II is Director and Professor of Arts Studies at North Carolina State University and he is the director of the North Carolina Computer Music Festival.

== Performances and publications ==
Waschka's performances and recordings are regularly reviewed in Computer Music Journal (MIT Press), the Classical Voice of North Carolina and Fanfare. Reviews have appeared in Journal SEAMUS, Technology Review, and other journals. A lengthy interview with Waschka appeared in 21st-Century Music, in December, 2007, conducted by Tom Moore.

Waschka has written articles on techniques used in his music and on other topics. Explanations of his notable work on composing with genetic algorithms appear in the book, Evolutionary Computer Music. He has performed music by Allen Strange, Pertti Jalava, Mansoor Hosseini, himself, and others.

== Discography ==
Riding with Phil, "Teth", Phasma Records, 2021.

A Tuesday with Rodney, Jeff Morris, composer; Waschka, performer, “Hearing Voices: Human Sounds, Digital Ears”, Ravello Records, 2020.

Considering Jupiter, Olga Kleiankina, piano, “...Our Passage To The Stars...”, Blue Griffin Records, 2019.

Au Revoir, Svetozar, Hong Kong New Music Ensemble, “Live From Prague”, Ablaze Records, 2017.

Belgrade Overture, Brno Philharmonic Orchestra, Mikel Toms, conductor, “Orchestral Masters”, Ablaze Records, 2013.

Winter Concerto, London Schubert Players chamber orchestra, Huw Morgan, trumpet soloist, “A European Odyssey”, Nimbus Records, 2013.

Singing in Traffic, Jonathan Kramer, cello, “CHASS Creates”, North Carolina State University, 2012.

Winter Concerto, the London Schubert Players chamber orchestra, Huw Morgan, trumpet soloist, “As You Like It”, RMA, 2013.

Reminded of Dickens, “60x60 2006-2007”, Vox Novus, 2008.

String Quartet: Laredo, Six Folksongs from an Imaginary Country (viola alone), Xuan Men (violin alone, Russian version), Ravel Remembers Fascism (cello alone), and String Quartet: Ha! Fortune. The Nevsky String Quartet, "Music for Strings" Capstone Records, 2007.

Singing in Traffic, Steve Duke, saxophone, "Evolutionary Computation", Springer, 2007.

Summer Concerto, Phillip Barham, sax soloist, and the Tennessee Tech Symphony Band, Joseph Hermann, director, Arizona University Recordings, 2007.

Saint Ambrose (opera), Steve Duke, saxophone, Capstone Records, 2002.

Still Life with Castanets, "Presence III", PeP, 2002.

Visions of Habakkuk, Centaur Records, 1996.

Xuan Men, Bruce Berg, violin, Centaur Records, 1994.

Help Me Remember, Waschka, soloist, Centaur Records, 1993.

Last Night, Phillip Barham, sax, Yumi Mayama-Livesay, piano; Centaur Records, 1992.

A Noite, Porem, Rangeu E Quebrou, George Dimitri, string bass, Centaur Records, 1991.

More Adult Music and This Is Music As It Was Expected, Composer: Antonio Ferreira; Text: Waschka and Ferreira. Waschka (voice), "LOW FIDELITY MUSIC", Ama Romanta Records, 1988. Rereleased on Plancton Records, 2002.

Euwe Suite and Runes, "Cartography". IRIDA Records, 1986.
