= Nexsound =

Ukrainian independent record label

- Founded: 2000; 25 years ago
- Founder: Andriy Kirichenko
- Country of origin: Ukraine
- Location: Kharkiv, Ukraine

Nexsound is a Ukraine based independent record label founded by Andrey Kiritchenko in 2000 and was also co-operated by Dmytro Fedorenko (Kotra) from 2003 till July 2007.
Founded in 2000, Nexsound has been dedicated to the unusual and experimental music, both acoustic and electronic, released on CDs, cassettes and digital releases. During 8 years of its activity Nexsound released 60 albums from more than 30 artists, such as Muslimgauze, Kim Cascone, Perlonex with Charlemagne Palestine and Keith Rowe, Anla Courtis, Tom Carter, Zavoloka, Kotra, the Moglass, Andrey Kiritchenko and many more. From 2005 to 2007 Nexsound hosts international festival for electronic music and visual arts - Detali Zvuku.
In 2007 Nexsound opened up a new series of CDs – Nexsound PQP (pickup) which is dedicated to music that lies on the edges of pop and experimental music.

== Notable artists ==
- Andrey Kiritchenko
- Kotra
- Zavoloka
- Alla Zagaykevych
- Muslimgauze
- Kim Cascone
- Francisco López
- the Moglass
- Saralunden

== Discography ==
- 13.2000 : Sidhartha - Alfa Moon Planets EP (CDr)
- none : Various Nexsound Sampler #1 (CDr)
- none : Various Nexsound Sampler #2 (CDr)
- none : Various Nexsound Sampler #3 (CDr)
- ns01 : Cold War Mechanizm - Surrendered (Cassette)
- ns02 : Nihil Est Excellence - 4e4558.424f54 (Cassette)
- ns03 : Alphonse De Montfroyd - Silence (CDr 3")
- ns04 : Various Polyvox Populi (CD)
- ns05 : Nihil Est Excellence + the Moglass - The Nihil Est eXcellence + The Moglass (CDr 3")
- ns06 : the Moglass - Kogda Vse Zveri Zhili Kak Dobrye Sosedi (CD5")
- ns07 : Kotra - Stir Mesh (CDr)
- ns08 : Kim Cascone / Andrey Kiritchenko / Andreas Berthling / Kotra - Fourfold Symmetry (CD)
- ns09 : Alphonse De Montfroyd + Nihil Est Excellence - Defect Analysts (CD3")
- ns10 : Francisco López / Andrey Kiritchenko - Mavje (CD)
- ns11 : the Moglass - Saliva (MP3)
- ns12 : the Moglass - Uhodyaschie Vdal' Telegrafnye Stolby Stanovyatsa Vsyo Men'she I Men'she (CD)
- ns13 : Ok 01 - Where I've Been, What I've Seen (MP3)
- ns14 : Various Polyvox Populi 2 (MP3)
- ns15 : Infra Red Army - Black Body EP (MP3)
- ns16 : I/DEX / h.h.t.p. / -ED - Micro Motion (MP3)
- ns17 : Zavoloka - Suspenzia (MP3)
- ns17e : Zavoloka - Suspenzia (CD)
- ns18 : I/DEX - Seqsextend (CD)
- ns19 : Muslimgauze - In Search Of Ahmad Shah Masood (CD)
- ns20 : Various Rural Psychogeography (CD)
- ns21 : Ok 01 - To A.K. W/ Best Wishez (MP3)
- ns22 : Derek Holzer + Oloolo - Kosta (MP3)
- ns23 : Kotra - Live Sessions (MP3)
- ns24 : Lunt - An Half Of You (MP3)
- ns25 : Tirriddiliu - Deliranti In Circostanze Astratte (MP3)
- ns26 : Muslimgauze - Vote Hezbollah (CD)
- ns27 : Kotra - Dissilient (CD)
- ns27a : Kotra - Acute (MP3)
- ns28 : Tom Carter & Vanessa Arn / the Moglass - Snake-Tongued Swallow-Tailed (CD)
- ns29 : Alexei Borisov / Pomassl / Andrey Kiritchenko / Kotra - Live In Jaroslavl (MP3)
- ns30 : Andrey Kiritchenko - True Delusion (CD)
- ns31 : Violet - Electrolux (MP3)
- ns32 : Arturas Bumsteinas - Retorta Ver.1 (MP3)
- ns33 : Process - #1 (MP3)
- ns34 : Tirriddiliu - Conglomerato Auto-Deviante Di Strumenti E Suonatori (MP3)
- ns35 : Nilan Perera - Harmless Love (MP3)
- ns36 : Critikal - State (MP3)
- ns37 : Zavoloka - Plavyna (CD)
- ns38 : Alla Zagaykevych - Motus (CD)
- ns39 : Paul Kust / Andrey Kiritchenko / Kotra - Curious Kitchen (MP3)
- ns40 : Various - Fabelbuch (MP3)
- ns41 : Kidsok Nuit - Say Goodbye (MP3)
- ns42 : Matsutake - Nine & Seventeen (MP3)
- ns43 : Gultskra Artikler - Moreprodukt (MP3)
- ns44 : Zavoloka & AGF - Nature Never Produces The Same Beat Twice (CD)
- ns46 : Ballrooms Of Mars - Cédre (MP3)
- ns47 : Alla Zagaykevych - To Escape, To Breathe, To Keep Silence (MP3)
- ns48 : Nole Plastique - Sourire En Souriant (MP3)
- ns49 : Andrey Kiritchenko / Anla Courtis / Moglass - The Courtis / Kiritchenko / Moglass (CD)
- ns51 : Andrey Kiritchenko - Stuffed With/Out (CD)
- ns52 : Zavoloka vs. Kotra - To Kill The Tiny Groovy Cat EP (CD)
- ns52 : Zavoloka vs. Kotra - To Kill The Tiny Groovy Cat EP (MP3)
- ns53 : Nikita Golyshev & Sergey Letov - Live At NCCA (MP3)
- ns54 : Perlonex / Keith Rowe / Charlemagne Palestine - Tensions (2xCD)
- ns55 : Bluermutt - When I'm Not (MP3)
- ns57 : First 8 - In Tune (MP3)
- ns58 : Various - Vibrating Portraits (MP3)
- ns59 : Various - In Memoriam Nesterov (MP3)
- ns60 : Critikal - Graphorrhea (CD)
- ns61 : Roman Slavka - After Long Time Of Mute (MP3)
- ns62 : Andrey Kiritchenko & Andrey Bogatyryev - Uncap Cocoons (3"CDr)
- ns63 : Nikolaienko - Loops & Cuts Soup (MP3)
- ns64 : Riasni Drova Consort – Numberless Occupations Left Me Little Leisure (MP3)
- ns65 : Galun & Ilia Belorukov – Somnolence (MP3)
- ns66 : v4w.enko and Sanmi – Y:E:T (CDr)
- ns67 : Alla Zagaykevych & Electroacoustic's Ensemble – Nord/Ouest (CD)
- ns68 : Andrey Kiritchenko – Chrysalis (12"vinyl)
- ns69 : Мутафория Лили - Сюргазм мёртвой медузы (MP3)
- ns70 : Andrey Kiritchenko – Enough Heaven (7"vinyl)
- ns71 : Maxim Trianov - A Chance to Remember (MP3)
- nsp01 : Saralunden . Björkås* . Mjös - Dubious (CD)
- nsp02 : Saralunden & Andrey Kiritchenko - There Was No End (CD)
- nsp03 : Nole Plastique - Escaperhead (CD)
- nsp04 : Bluermutt - Decivilize After Consumption (CD)
- nsp05 : Ojra & Kiritchenko - A Tangle of Mokosha (CD)

== See also ==
- List of record labels
