= SPCS =

SPCS may refer to:

- Society for the Promotion of Community Standards
- State Plane Coordinate System
- St. Paul's Convent School, a secondary school in Hong Kong
- Soldier Plate Carrier System, a U.S. Army bulletproof vest
- Satanicpornocultshop
- Swiss Post Cybersecurity
