= Zavoloka =

Ukrainian musician

ZAVOLOKA
- Born: Kateryna Zavoloka (Катерина Заволока)
- Origin: Kyiv, Ukraine
- Genres: Experimental Music; Electronic music Psychedelic music Ethnic Electronica; Microsound; Ukrainian folk music
- Occupations: Artist; Composer; Musician; Sound artist Improviser; Graphic designer
- Years active: 2002 - present
- Labels: Kvitnu; Polyfusia
- Member of: Zavoloka-Agf, Kotra & Zavoloka
- Website: zavoloka.com

Zavoloka (full name Kateryna Zavoloka, Ukrainian: Катерина Заволока) is a Ukrainian contemporary experimental music and electronic music composer, sound artist, improviser, performer and graphic designer from Kyiv, the capital of Ukraine. She was born in 1981 and is currently based in Berlin, Germany.

The word zavoloka means deep fog and also maverick in Ukrainian. Zavoloka's main interests in music are to mix ancient Ukrainian traditions with modern electronic music technology. She combines melodic experimental electronic music with self-recorded Ukrainian folk music.

== Career ==
In 2003, the Nexsound label released her first album Suspenzia. At the end of 2003 the CD "I" appeared on the American label Zeromoon.

Her full-length CD "Plavyna" was debuted at the beginning of 2005 under the Austrian label Laton and under the Ukrainian label Nexsound. The CD took an honorary mention at the Prix Ars Electronica in 2005.

In the June 2007 issue of The Wire there was an article detailing Zavoloka's music. In addition, one collaborative track with Kotra appeared on the magazine's Wire Tapper 16 and her solo composition "Inhale", from Viter, was featured on the Wire Tapper 20.

In 2011 Zavoloka released "Vedana" CD and in 2007 Viter on the label Kvitnu, 2 of the series of albums dedicated to Elements of Air, Water, Earth and Fire.

In 2008 Zavoloka received the "Gaude Polonia" grant, hosted by National Centre for Culture, Ministry of Culture in Poland, and worked at the Electroacoustic Studio at the Academy of Music in Kraków. She has also worked at the different studios, including EMS in Stockholm, Sweden and the INA-GRM studio in Paris.

Zavoloka is a graphic designer for Kvitnu, also has designed works for the Detali Zvuku Festival, Kvitnu Fest, for Seefeel's "Seefeel" album, "Faults" EP and others.

== Collaborations ==
- Kotra - Ukrainian musician, sound artist, runner of label Kvitnu, Kvitnu Fest and Detali Zvuku festival. Kotra & Zavoloka have several releases on Ukrainian label Kvitnu in 2006, and often perform live together. Their track, Cool Eyes, appeared on the Wire Tapper 16 CD release.
- Mark Clifford - (from Seefeel, label Polyfusia, Warp records) Musician from the UK. In 2007 they released Split01 EP on Polyfusia Records.
- AGF - a.k.a. Antye Greie, German poet and musician. In 2006 they released the full-length CD Nature Never Produces the Same Beat Twice on Nexsound and performed at a series of European music festivals that same year.
- Laetitia Morais - visual artist from Portugal. Laetitia Morais made a music video for Zavoloka's "Exhale" track, featured on Viter.
- Anders Dahl - Swedish musician from the Hapna label. Zavoloka and Anders Dahl participated in the SWIZHE project, hosted by the Swedish Institute from 2006 to 2007.
- Katya Chilly - Ukrainian vocalist. They performed several live concerts together, and collaborated in making the music for a "Krashen Vechir" video.
- Zavoloka also took part the multimedia Move project with: Johannes Burstrom (Sweden) - musician, bassist, sound artist and web designer, Tobias Leira (Norway) - lighting designer and video artist, Charlotta Ruth (Sweden) and Alexandr Andriyashkin (Russia) - contemporary choreographers and dancers.

== Live performance ==
Zavoloka performs live regularly and has played at many international music festivals around the world like: Presences Electronique (Groupe de Recherches Musicales, INA-GRM), club transmediale , Kvitnu Fest, Madeiradig, Unsound NYC, Detali Zvuku festival, Being the Future, Les Urbaines, Stimul, Garage, Unsound, Femmes, Cimatics, Interferenze, Radius, Nuit Bleue, EME07, AudioVisiva and others.

In 2011 Zavoloka was specially invited by Aphex Twin (UK) to support his audiovisual rave shows in UK and Denmark.

== Discography ==
- 2003 Zavoloka "Suspenzia" (Digital download), Nexsound
- 2004 Zavoloka "I" (CDr 3"), Zeromoon
- 2005 Zavoloka "Plavyna" (CD / Digital download), Nexsound/Laton
- 2005 Zavoloka "Suspenzia" (CD / Digital download), Nexsound
- 2005 Zavoloka & Kotra "Untitled Live" (CDr), Live Reports
- 2006 Zavoloka "Nata" (Digital download), Surreal Madrid
- 2006 Zavoloka versus Kotra "To kill the tiny groovy cat" (CD / Digital download), Nexsound
- 2006 Zavoloka-Agf "Nature Never Produces The Same Beat Twice" (CD / Digital download), Nexsound
- 2006 Kotra & Zavoloka "Wag the Swing" (CD / Digital download), Kvitnu
- 2007 Mark Clifford & Zavoloka "Split01" (CD / Digital download), Polyfusia
- 2007 Zavoloka "Viter" (CD / Digital download), Kvitnu
- 2011 Zavoloka "Svitlo" (Digital download), Kvitnu
- 2011 Zavoloka "Vedana" (CD enhanced / Digital download), Kvitnu
- 2012 Kotra&Zavoloka&Dunaewsky69 "Kallista" (CD / Digital download), Kvitnu
- 2014 Zavoloka "Volya" (CD / Digital download), Kvitnu
- 2017 Zavoloka "Syngonia" (CD / Digital download / Vinyl), Kvitnu

== Tracks in compilations ==
- Metropolitan Fairytales (CD) Trrrr, Underground Mov..., Innertion
- Aout 2005 (MP3) Accuracy, Off & Green Project
- Prix Ars Electronica Cd Compilation, track "Kolyskova", taken from "Plavyna" Cd, 2005.
- Culmination (2xCD) Mood Laton
- Music 2 Fall Asleep 2 (MP3) Nathennia Zerinnerung
- Nexsound Sampler #2 (CDr) Rankova Nexsound
- VA (MP3) Lychko Rumjanilo Telescope
- Europa (MP3) Temna Nichka (Vocal Fo... Plex Records)
- Post Awakening Sound (MP3) Nebo Skyapnea
- the Wire Tapper 16, Kotra & Zavoloka, Cool eyes
- "Tetroid po dolynah", track for "Tetroid" mp3 compilation, 2008
- Zavoloka's track "Dzvenity" (vocal by Danya Chekun) on 12 inch vinyl, release of Surreal Madrid label, "Kill the headliners!" compilation. 2007
- ZAVOLOKA'S track in MEDIATERRAE vol.1 DVD, with BLOWUP magazine. 2007
- "CHAIN-MUSIC", Zavoloka's track for Ryuichi Sakamoto's compilation. 2007
- 2008 Zavoloka/Laetitia Video "Exhale"V/A "High Blood Pressure" (Audio/Video CDr), Kvitnu
- The Wire Tapper 20, Zavoloka Inhale, Wire Magazine, 2008
- Tetroid 2012, Entity
- "Gorogoro Garagara Rimikkusu", "Kodomo" - Zavoloka remix for Gurun Gurun, vocal by Aki Tomita, Home Normal, 2010
- "The Morning Line", "Volution" - vinyl compilation for "The Morning Line" project, with catalogue, 2011
- "Myths&Masks of Karol Szymanowski by Ukrainian sound artists", track "Anxiety", CD compilation, Kvitnu 2011

== Awards ==
Zavoloka "Plavyna" (CD) was honorary mentioned at the Prix Ars Electronica in 2005.

== See also ==
- label Kvitnu
