= Qwartz Electronic Music Awards =

French electronic music award

- Current: Qwartz Music Awards
- Date: March 29, 2012
- Location: 104, Paris (2012)
- Country: France
- Presented by: Alexandre Grauer
- First award: 2005
- Final award: current
- Website: qwartz.fr

The Qwartz Electronic Music Awards recognize new and electronic music with awards and grants in music and technologies categories. An annual event takes place in Paris. The Qwartz Awards are presided by the pioneer Pierre Henry. Besides the awards, Qwartz organizes an International New and Electronic Music Market, concerts, parties and conferences. The Qwartz Awards recognize all aspects of contemporary art : music, audiovisual works and graphics, instruments, technological innovations, festivals, medias and new media arts. Pierre Henry, Derrick May, Laurie Anderson, Mathhew Herbert, Björk, Wolfgang Voigt, Otavio Henrique Soares Brandao, Ake Parmerud, Henri Pousseur, Can, Klaus Schulze, Lionel Marchetti in particular have already been awarded with a Qwartz d'Honneur.

== Jury procedure ==
Selections are made by juries who select blind, without knowing the names of the artists or labels. After the juries nominate several releases or tracks in the different categories, Internet users are invited to listen to the nominated works and then vote for the prize-winners.

== The awards categories ==
Awarded by the Juries

- Album
- Experimentation/Research
- Discovery
- Compilation
- Track
- Dancefloor
- Artwork and Packaging
- New Media Arts (no longer awarded)
- Artist
- Label

Awarded by management/honour committee

- Qwartz d’Honneur
- Qwartz Pierre Schaeffer
- Qwartz Max Mathews (technological innovation)

Awarded by management/honour committee from 2015 Qwartz 10th years anniversary

- Qwartz du Génie Musical
- Qwartz de l'Innovation Musicale

== 2005 ==
(Paris, Le Cabaret Sauvage)

- Qwartz d'honneur: Pierre Schaeffer
- Album: Welcome Tourist / B.Fleischmann / Morr Music (Germany-Austria)
- Discover: The Exchange / Alix / Les Disques Sérieux/Nocturne (France)
- Track: Escal in The Exchange / Alix / Les Disques Sérieux/Nocturne (France)
- Vinyl: A heart & two stars / Music A.M / Quatermass (Germany-Belgium)
- Compilation: Maximas Texturas / Discos Konfort (Mexico)
- Remix & Reprise: High again in Tribute To Remixes / Brain Damage / Dub Wiser - Hammerbass (France)
- Clip: Hey Bonus ! - Octet / Camille Henrot / Diamond Traxx/Metronomic (France)
- Artwork & Packaging: January / Taylor Deupree / Photographe & Uison Design / Spekk (Japan)
- Composer/Arrangement: Uwe Schmidt (Germany)
- Live: Dzihan and Kamien - Crouch Records (Yugoslavia-Switzerland)
- Label: Poeta Negra (Greece)
- Artist: Coloma - Ware Records (Germany/England)
- DJ Producer: Automat - Sounds Around Records (France)
- Autoproduction: Des hauts & des bas / Lou / Ici (Londres-France)
- Hybrid: Cocoon, Optical Sound (France)
- Max Mathews: TUB X, Rémi Dury (France)
- Robert Moog: Live [software], Ableton
- Event: Festival MUTEK, Québec, Canada

== 2006 ==
(Paris, Le Cirque d'Hiver Bouglione)

- Track: Sofa / Motel *** / Dazzle and Delight (France)
- Album: No Waves / Micro Audio Waves / N Records (Portugal)
- Discover: Scatter Scards / Andrey Kiritchenko / Minusn Netlabel (Ukraine) and 2 / Leonard de Leonard / Leonizer Records (France)
- Dance-Floor: No fun (OK Cowboy) / Vitalic / Citizen Records (France)
- Experimental/Research: Zap Meemees / Satanicpornocultshop / Sonore (Japan)
- Compilation: Fax collaborations & remixes / Static Discos (Mexico)
- Clip:: Fully Connected / Marco Madruga & Daniela Krts
- Artwork & Packaging: Nicola Bork for "Mimetic Dancing" de Mimetic – Hands (Germany)
- Promising artist: Murcof (Mexico)
- Label: Tomlab (Germany)
- Live Act: Felix Kubin (Germany)
- DJ Producer: Helius Zhamiq
- Hybrid: Mladafronta DVD – Parametric (France)
- Arrangement & Composition: Vitalic (France)
- Vinyl: "Vista le Vie" de A futuristic family film – F Communications (France)
- Event: Dis-patch Beograd
- Qwartz d'honneur: Pierre Henry (France), Klaus Schulze (Germany), Can (Germany)
- Qwartz Pierre Schaeffer: Bernard Parmegiani

== 2007 ==
(Paris, Le Cirque d'Hiver Bouglione)

- Track: The Ukrainians / Bryce Kushnier / Intr-version (Canada)
- Album: Dovetail / Coloma / Klein Records (Great Britain)
- Discover: The correct use of pets / Hypo & Edh / Active Suspension (France)
- Dance-Floor: Ripple effect / 20for7 / Chocoflash (Australia)
- Experimental/Research: Shaper of form / Dani Joss / Poeta Negra (Greece)
- Compilation: Bip_Hop generation vol.8 / Bip-hop (France)
- Clip: Under the bridge / Baiyon / Brain Escape Sandwich / Rec-Catchpulse(Shinsuke Yamaji) (Japan) and SchnittMenge / Spenza / Stephan Bolch (Germany)
- Artwork & Packaging: Olivier Weber for Zombiparti ! de Kid Chocolat - Poor Records (Switzerland)
- Artist: Coloma
- Label: Staubgold (Germany)
- Hybrid: Rodolphe Von Gombergh. RVG (France)
- Event: Synch (Greece) and Nuits Sonores (Lyon, France)
- Max Mathews: FM3 Buddha Machine (China/USA)
- Robert Moog: Haliaetus (France)
- Qwartz d'honneur: Björk
- Qwartz Pierre Schaeffer: Henri Pousseur (Belgium) and Otavio Soares Brandão(Brazil)

== 2008 ==
(Paris, Le Cirque d'Hiver Bouglione)

- Présidence d'Honneur: Robin Rimbaud aka Scanner
- Album: Edith Progue / Timeline / Mille Plateaux
- Experimental/Research: Laurent Chambert / Suspense
- Discover: The Penelopes / The Arrogance of Simplicity / Citizen Records
- Artist: LR & RadioMentale
- Artwork & Packaging: Jon Wozencroft, for “l’album 4 Rooms”/Jacob Kirkegaard /Touch
- Track:: Long tongue / Micro Audio Waves in odd size baggage / Magic Music
- Dance-Floor: Cocotte / Teenage Bad Girl in Cocotte / Citizen Records
- Compilation: 50 AÑOS (1956–2006) de Musica Electroacustica en Chile, Consejo Nacional de la Cultura y las Artes / Pueblo Nuevo / 3 CDs /press1 /press2
- Label: Citizen Records (France)
- Hybrid: Naphtaline, Ez3kiel, Jarring Effects
- Event: Les Nuits Electroniques de L’Ososphère (Strasbourg, France)
- Qwartz d'honneur: Blixa Bargeld
- Qwartz Pierre Schaeffer : Jean-Claude Risset, Beatriz Ferreyra, Max Mathews

== 2009 ==
(Paris, Le Cirque d'Hiver Bouglione)

- Chairmanship: Taylor Deupree
- Album: krill.minima / urlaub auf balkonien / Thinner Netlabel
- Experimental/Research: Lionel Marchetti / Adèle et Hadrien: Le Livre des Vacances / Optical Sound
- Discover: Pirata / Minimental / The Arrogance of Simplicity / Pueblo Nuevo Netlabel
- Artwork & Packaging: skoltz_kolgen for Silent Room / ARCADI / Optical Sound
- Video: skoltz_kolgen for Silent Room / ARCADI / Optical Sound
- Track: Stefan Mallmann / Chicken and Wings in Interlude Ep / Night Drive Music
- Dance-Floor: Apparat / "Fractales (Apparat Ibiza Version)" on Things To Be Frickled (2008)
- Compilation: Autumn Leaves / Gruenrekorder
- Artist: Lionel Marchetti
- Label: Kompakt
- Qwartz d'honneur: Wolfgang Voigt
- Qwartz dierre Schaeffer: Åke Parmerud, Roger Cochini
- Qwartz Max Mathews: Bert Schiettecatte / AudioCubes Percussa (Belgium)
- Web: Kenneth Goldsmith for UbuWeb
- Press: Tony Herrington for the magazine The Wire
- Digital Arts: Maurice Benayoun

== 2010 ==
(Paris, Le Palais Brongiart)

- Chairmanship: Gudrun Gut
- Jury's President: Alejandro Jodorowsky
- Official Jury: Christophe, Bernard Parmegiani, Patrice Renson
- Professional Jury: Jocelyne Auzende, Alain Brohard, David Chauveau, Marek Choloniewski, Jean-Marc Clogenson, Hubert Michel, Damien Moreno, Kevin Ringeval, Remco Schuurbiers

Awards

- Album: Fedayi Pacha - From the Oriental School of dub [Hammerbass]
- Experimentation/Research: Hughes Germain - Esprit de sel [Volume-Collectif / Césaré]
- Discovery: Cercueil - Shoo Straight Shout [Optical Sound]
- Compilation: Alec Empire Plays Staubgold: Rauschgold (Staubgold)
- Anthology: Francisco López - Through the Looking-Glass (KAIROS)
- Track: Fractional - Tansw extrait de Still Life [The Centrifuge]
- Dancefloor: Daniela La Luz - Elle Routine extrait de Musik Non Stop Uno [Syncopated Musik]
- Artwork/Packaging: Mounir Jatoum (La Commissure) - Split d’Arnaud Rivière & Antoine Chessex [Le Petit Mignon]
- New Media Art: Kurt Hentschläger
- Artist: Arnaud Rebotini
- Label: Shitkatapult
- Qwartz Max Mathews: Olivier Sens - logiciel Usine
- Qwartz Pierre Schaeffer: François Bayle
- Qwartz of Honneur: Laurie Anderson

== 2011 ==
(Paris, La Cigale & Le Trianon)

- Chairmanship: Alva Noto
- Juries: Presidents: Matali Crasset & Pierre Cornette de Saint-Cyr
- Official Jury: Matali Crasset (President), Gilles Berquet, Mïrka Lugosi, Didier Varrod.
- Professional Jury: Alexis Alyskewicz & Aurore Menu, Yannick Blay, Frédéric Malki, Eric Mattson, Thomas Meinecke, Erik Minkkinen, Edouard Rostand, Christine Webster.
- New Media Arts Jury: Pierre Cornette de Saint-Cyr (President), Gilles Alvarez, Charles Carcopino, Régine Debatty, Benoît Guérinault, Anne Roquigny, Gerfried Stocker, Alain Thibaut.

Awards

- Album: Doll Divider by Olivia Louvel [France] - Optical Sound [France]
- Experimentation/Research: Antichamber by Yannis Kyriakides [Cyprus] - Unsounds [Netherlands]
- Discovery - Peste by Sturqen [Portugal] - Kvitnu [Ukraine]
- Compilation, A Man and A Machine 2 by Le Son du Maquis [France]
- Track, Fine Mouche by Khan (feat. Brigitte Fontaine) [Germany] – I'm a single Records [Germany]
- Dancefloor, The Beat of the Heart by Daniel Meteo [Germany] in Working Class, Shitkatapult [Germany]
- Artwork/Packaging, Loafnest (Andrew Lange + Michael S. Carlson) [United States] for Fever Dream by MAP
- Artist, Sturqen [Portugal]
- Label, Kvitnu [Ukraine]
- New Media Arts, Dust by Herman Kolgen [Canada] / Special Mention to Deshérence by ANTIVJ [France]
- Qwartzd'Honneur, Matthew Herbert [United Kingdom]
- Qwartz Pierre Schaeffer, Eliane Radigue [France]
- Qwartz Max Mathews, Harpe MIDI Camac [France]
- Qwartz, Special - Christine Groult by KM Pantin [France]

== 2012 ==
(Paris - 104)

- Chairmanship: Robert Henke /
- Juries' President : Monolake & Arnaud Rebotini
- Official Jury: Nicolas Dufourcq, Olaf Hund, David Jisse, Atau Tanaka.
- Professional Jury: Sébastien Auger, Xavier Ehretsmann, Sixto Fernando, Thomas Régnault, Tommy Vaudecrane, Christophe Vix-Gras.

Awards

- Album, Kilimanjaro by Superpitcher [Germany] – Kompakt [Germany]
- xperimentation, 18 pieces for the Midi harp by Elisabeth Valletti [France] – No label
- Discovery, Life on Titan by John Heckle [United Kingdom] - Mathematics Recordings [United States]
- Track, Dernière minute by Andy Moor [United Kingdom] and Anne-James Chaton [France] in Transfer/1 Departures - Unsounds [Netherlands]
- Dancefloor, Glass by Incite [Germany] in Dare to Dance – Hands productions [Germany]
- Artwork/Packaging, Marc-Antoine Beaufils [France] for Semelles de fondation - Bloc Thyristors [France] / Bimbo Tower [France]
- Qwartz d'Honneur, Morton Subotnick [United States]
- Qwartz Pierre Schaeffer, Francis Dhomont [France]
- Qwartz Max Mathews, Hopman Sound Transfer [France]
- New Media Arts, Sound in Process : Lights contacts by Scenocosme (Grégory Lasserre & Anaïs met den Ancxt) [France]

RFI contest winners

- Alexandre Navarro – France
- Bérangère Maximin – France
- Dan Charles Dahan – France
- Didier Achtal – France
- Djiiva, Marise Cardoso – Spain
- Elisabeth Valletti – France
- Felipe Otondo – Danemark
- Franck Dadure – France
- Gianluca Porcu – Italy
- Hughes Germain – France
- Jonathan Rogissart – France
- Juan Crek – Spain
- Manon Deruytere – France
- Nicolas Cante – France
- Panayiotis Kokoras – Greece
- Sébastien Lavoie – Quebec
- Théo Boulenger – France
- Thomas Albiach – France
- Yannick Franck – Belgium
- Ybrid, Sylvie Egret – France

== 2013 ==
(Paris - La Machine du Moulin Rouge)

- Chairmanship: Jean-François Zygel (President of the Jury)
- Président d'Honneur: Richard Pinhas
- Official Jury: Christophe Bourseiller, Nicolas Dufourcq, Bruno Letort, Laurent Tran Van Lieu, Thomas Valentin.
- Professional Jury: Alix Clément, Manon Deruytere, Fabrice Fassnacht, Kevin Ringeval, Perrine Vincent.

Awards

- Qwartz d'Honneur: Derrick May
- Album: Sentimental Favourites LP de Andrew Pekler [Dekorder]
- Expérimentation: 1-Bell Fantasia de Junya Oikawa [ZKM] 2-Oval DNA de Oval – [Shitkatapult]
- Discovery: lucen de afarOne [karlrecords]
- Track: Lente dépression de Arne Vinzon [dokidoki]
- Qwartz Max Matthews: Le Dyskograf
