= Alexandre Navarro =

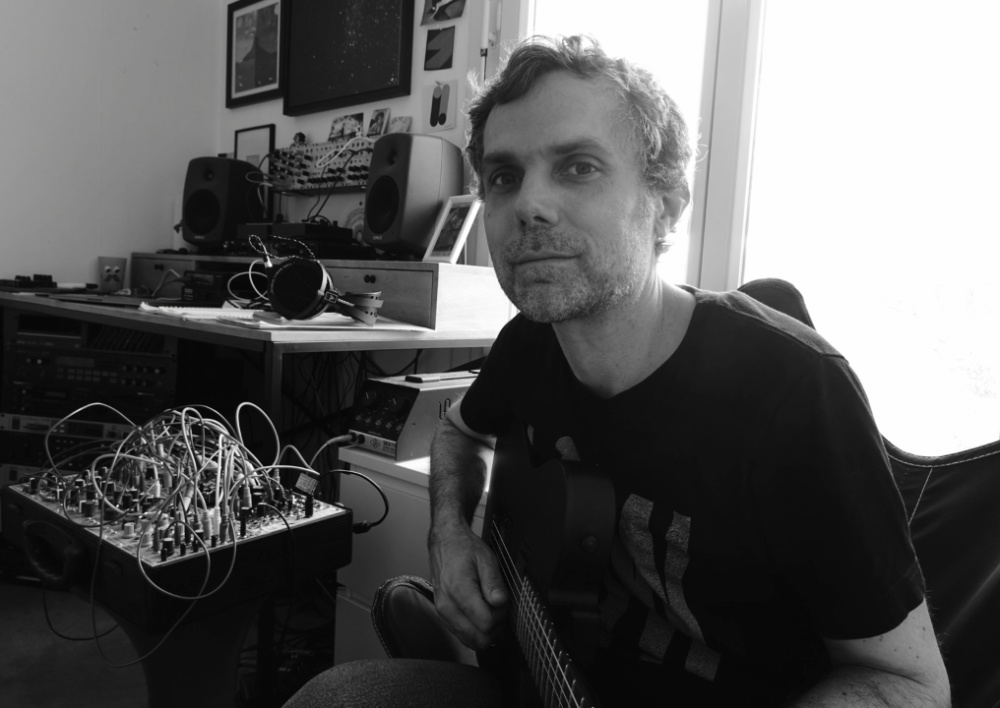
- Navarro in his home studio

Background information
- Also known as: AN, Navarro
- Born: 27 August 1974 (age 51); France
- Origin: France, Bordeaux
- Genres: Ambient, Shoegaze, Electronic
- Instruments: Guitar, Sampler, Modular synthesizer, Synthesizer
- Labels: Facade Electronics, DISQAN, Archipel, Sem label, Constellation Tatsu, Dronarivm, Laverna,
- Website: alexandrenavarro.net

Alexandre Navarro is a french guitarist from Bordeaux living in Paris, sound experimenter, composer & underground producer.

== Career ==
Navarro is considered as a "French master minimalist composer" He studied electroacoustic music, concrete music and electronic music at Conservatoire à rayonnement régional de Bordeaux under the guidance of composer Christian Eloy and Octandre French association. He started an official career with the release of his first album on the swiss Creative Commons label Realaudio. After 7 years of running labels, Alexandre Navarro decided in 2014 to concentrate on his own works. Alexandre Navarro has launched a new label in 2019 called "Les disques imaginations", and then he relaunched "DISQAN" in 2025

== Logo ==
Alexandre Navarro has collaborated with German designer Markus Schäfer since 2008, both on his artworks and on his logo, which was created in 2011 and redesigned in 2023.

== Discography ==
Year	Title	Label	Type	Format	Notes
2004	Please, Sit Down	Realaudio	LP	CDR	
2005	Future Nature	Realaudio	LP	Digital	
2005	Medium	Archipel	EP	Digital	
2006	Eko Std.	Standard Klik Music	EP	Digital	
2006	Dimension	Standard Klik Music	EP	Digital	
2006	Ame	Archipel	EP	Digital	
2007	1001	Mandorla	EP	Digital	
2008	Arcane	SEM label	LP	CD	Qwartz Awards 2009 nomination, "section découverte"
2011	Loka	SEM label	LP	Vinyle	Qwartz Awards 2011 nomination, "section meilleur album"
2012	Elements	SEM label	LP	Digital	
2012	Cycles	Laverna	EP	Digital	
2012	Sketches	Constellation Tatsu	LP	Digital	
2013	Hozho	SEM label	LP	CD	
2013	Lost Cities	Dronarivm	LP	Cassette	
2013	Redfish	SEM label	—	Digital	
2014	La Danse Des Substances	DISQAN	LP	CD	
2015	Daimon	DISQAN	—	Digital	
2016	Routes	DISQAN	LP	CDR carbon	
2017	Anti-matière	Archipel	LP	Digital	
2018	Imaginations	Self-released	LP	Cassette	
2019	Pneuma	DISQAN	EP	Cassette	
2019	Le liens magnétiques	DISQAN	LP	Cassette	
2020	Distil	Microrama	EP	Digital	
2020	26 impressions de l'âme	DISQAN	LP	Cassette	
2022	Onde salée	DISQAN	EP	Digital	
2023	Phases	Handstitched	EP	Cassette	
2023	Netlabels Works 2004 — 2008	Self-released	—	Digital	
2023	Sun-Bolein	Facade Electronics	LP	CD	
2025	Les Toiles de nuits	Facade Electronics	LP	Digital	
2026	Naviguer le rêve	Facade Electronics	LP	Digital	

== Filmography ==
Feature Films

Year	Title	Director	Notes
2026	Fasination Street	James Latter	Soundtrack

Documentaries

Year	Title	Director	Notes
2016	Mariannes Noires	Mame-Fatou Niang & Kaytie Nielsen	Soundtrack

Short Films

Year	Title	Director	Notes
2016	Traveller	James Latter	Soundtrack
2018	Everything is upstream	Martin Ponferrada	Soundtrack; Award for best music
2021	Home	James Latter	Soundtrack

== Collaborations ==
- 2000, Music for Futura, festival international d'art acousmatique et des arts de support
- 2001, 2002, 2003 – Exhibition " Less and More " Frédéric Druot Architecte – Ministère de la Culture
- 2004, Arborescence Exhibition " Creative Commons project " w/ Baptiste Houssin
- 2014, Mutant Area Exhibition
- 2016, Additional score of the short movie "Traveller" directed by James Latter
- 2018, Score of the short movie "Everything is Upstream" directed by Martin Ponferrada

== Remixes ==
Année	Titre	Œuvre originale / artistes
2006	My Life In The Bush Of Ghosts	Piste originale : Brian Eno + David Byrne
2016	Midi Sans Frontieres	Piste originale : Squarepusher

== Awards ==
Year	Award	Category	Work	Details
2017	Southern Shorts Awards	Music Award of Excellence – Best Music	Everything is Upstream	Score for short movie directed by Martin Ponferrada
