= Micro Audio Waves =

Portuguese band

The Micro Audio Waves
- Origin: Portugal
- Genres: Indietronica
- Years active: 2000-
- Members: Cláudia Efe; Flak; C. Morgado; Francisco Rebelo

Micros Audio Waves are a Portuguese band. Micro Audio Waves, originally a duo formed by Flak (the guitar player from Rádio Macau) and C. Morgado (electronic instruments), they formed in 2000, and began by developing compositions with a minimal and experimental electronica style, the results of which can be heard in their first album Micro Audio Waves (2002).

With the addition of Claudia Efe (vocals), the project took on a new direction towards electronic pop, without betraying the experimental elements. When 2004's No Waves was released, Micro Audio Waves were featured as a Peel Session by the late John Peel at BBC Radio One, and they won the Qwartz Electronic Music Awards in Paris (best album and best videoclip). One of their best known singles so far has been the 2004 song Fully Connected, in which the assembling instructions from some electronic apparatus are sung in a contrasting sensuous human voice by Claudia Efe.

Their next album "Odd Size Baggage" was released in April 2007. One of its songs, "Long Tongue" won the Qwartz Electronic Music Awards in 2008 for best song. Another song, "down by flow" was nominated but did not win. In 2009, Francisco Rebelo joined the band and they teamed up with renowned choreographer and stage director Rui Horta to create Zoetrope, a concert / performance combining live songs with video and interactive imagery. A film of this show and its music was released on DVD+CD. In 2024 released Glimmer (Self-released) and like Zoetrope, teamed up with Rui Horta and toured around the country with a concert / performance.

== Discography ==
- Micro Audio Waves (2002)
- No Waves (2004)
- Odd Size Baggage (2007)
- Zoetrope (2009)
- Glimmer (2024)

== DVD ==
- Zoetrope (2009)
