= Anjalika Sagar =

British filmmaker and curator (born 1968)

- Born: 1968 (age 57–58); London, England
- Education: SOAS University of London; Middlesex University
- Occupations: Filmmaker, curator, video essayist and photographer
- Known for: Co-founder with Kodwo Eshun of artist collective The Otolith Group

Anjalika Sagar (born 1968) is a British filmmaker, curator, video essayist and photographer, whose work has been shown at exhibitions internationally. In 2002, she co-founded with Kodwo Eshun the Turner Prize-nominated artists' collective The Otolith Group, based in London.

== Biography ==
Anjalika Sagar was born in London, England, in 1968. She earned BA degree in Social Anthropology and Hindi at the University of London's School of Oriental and African Studies (1997) and an MA in Fine Art and Theory at Middlesex University (2004).

In 2002, she co-founded with Kodwo Eshun The Otolith Group, a collective of interdisciplinary artists working internationally. As stated on the website of the International Curators Forum (ICF): "Approaching curation as an artistic practice of building intergenerational and cross-cultural platforms, the collective has been influential in critically introducing particular works of artists such as Chris Marker, Harun Farocki, Anand Patwardhan, Etel Adnan, Black Audio Film Collective, Sue Clayton, Mani Kaul, Peter Watkins, and Chimurenga in the UK, US, Europe, and Lebanon." In 2010, the Otolith Group was nominated for the Turner Prize for its project A Long Time Between Suns, a series of exhibitions.

Sagar's father was the artist Vidya Sagar (1938–2016), who collaborated with the Otolith group on a number of their films, and to whom the major work O Horizon is dedicated.
