= Kodwo Eshun =

British-Ghanaian writer, theorist and filmmaker (born 1967)

- Born: 1967 (age 58–59); London, England
- Education: University College, Oxford University; Southampton University
- Occupations: Writer, theorist and filmmaker
- Known for: Co-founding art collective The Otolith Group
- Notable work: More Brilliant than the Sun: Adventures in Sonic Fiction (1998)
- Relatives: Ekow Eshun (brother)

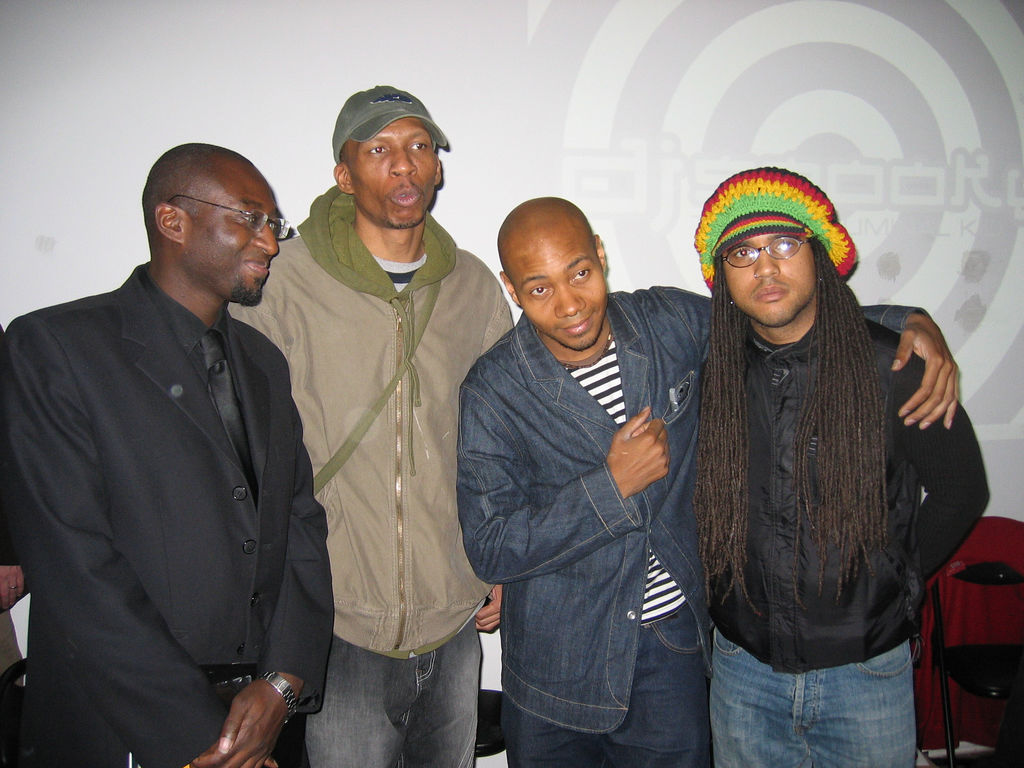
Eshun, Hank Shocklee, Paul Miller, Daniel Bernard Roumain at Chelsea Art Museum, 2005

Kodwo Eshun (born 1967) is a British-Ghanaian writer, theorist and filmmaker. He is perhaps best known for his 1998 book More Brilliant than the Sun: Adventures in Sonic Fiction and his association with the art collective The Otolith Group, which he co-founded in 2002 with Anjalika Sagar.

Eshun teaches on the MA in Contemporary Art Theory in the Department of Visual Cultures at Goldsmiths College, University of London, and at CCC Research Master Program of the Visual Arts Department at HEAD (Geneva University of Art and Design).

== Early life and education ==
Kodwo Eshun was born and raised in the far northern suburbs of London. His father was a prominent diplomat to the United Kingdom. His family is of the Fante people of Ghana, and his younger brother is the author and journalist Ekow Eshun.

As a youth, Eshun undertook a study of comic books, J. G. Ballard, and rock music. According to his brother, Eshun was heavily disturbed and influenced by the 1979 coup of Ghana carried out by J. J. Rawlings.

He studied English Literature (BA Hons, MA Hons) at University College, Oxford University, and a Romanticism and Modernism Masters at Southampton University.

In his first book, Kodwo Eshun devised a unique page-numbering system, beginning in negative numbers. On page −01[-017], he wrote:

At 17, Kodwo Eshun won an Open Scholarship to read Law at University College, Oxford. After eight days he switched to Literary Theory, magazine journalism and running clubs. He is not a cultural critic or cultural commentator so much as a concept engineer, an imagineer at the millennium's end writing on electronic music, science fiction, technoculture, gameculture, drug culture, post war movies and post war art for The Face, The Wire, i-D, Melody Maker, Spin, Arena and The Guardian.

He later described his decision to pursue music journalism professionally as a devotional act that included a vow of poverty.

== Writing ==
Eshun's writing deals with cyberculture, science fiction and music with a particular focus on where these ideas intersect with the African diaspora. He has contributed to a wide range of publications, including The Guardian, The Face, The Wire, i-D, Melody Maker, Spin, Arena, Frieze, CR: The New Centennial Review and 032c. As of 2002, he has quit music journalism. He now publishes academically, and teaches at Goldsmiths, University of London, in the Department of Visual Cultures, founded by Irit Rogoff. In the 1990s, he was affiliated with the Cybernetic Culture Research Unit, a cross-disciplinary research group out of the University of Warwick.

=== More Brilliant Than The Sun ===
Eshun's book More Brilliant than the Sun: Adventures in Sonic Fiction was published in 1998 and is "At its simplest ... a study of visions of the future in music from Sun Ra to 4 Hero". Written in a style that makes extensive use of neologism, re-appropriated jargon and compound words, the book explores the intersection of black music and science fiction from an afrofuturist viewpoint.

=== Architechtronics ===
Architechtronics is a collaboration by Kodwo Eshun and Franz Pomassl recorded live at the AR-60-Studio (ORF/FM4) Vienna in 1998. Eshun's contribution is the recitation of a text entitled "Black Atlantic Turns on the Flow Line", which condenses much of the thematic content of More Brilliant Than The Sun.

=== "Further Considerations on Afrofuturism" ===
Eshun's article "Further Considerations on Afrofuturism" was published in CR: The New Centennial Review, Volume 3, Number 2, Summer 2003. Through this article, he expounds upon the history and trajectory of Afrofuturism. He illuminates the specific functions of this genre, specifically its ability "to engineer feedback between [a] preferred future and [a] becoming present" and "to encourage a process of disalienation." Eshun deploys an unconventional framing device, inviting the reader to imagine "a team of African archaeologists from the future" attempting to reconstruct 20th-century Afrodiasporic subjectivity through a comparative study of various cultural media and artefacts. This framing technique can be read in terms of Eshun's notion of the "chronopolitical," the "temporal complications and anachronistic episodes that disturb the linear time of progress, adjust[ing] the temporal logics that condemned black subjects to prehistory."

Following Toni Morrison among others, Eshun positions African slaves as the first modern subjects, as well as “real world” subjects of science-fiction scenarios. Thus, while hegemonic future projections implicitly or explicitly exclude black subjects from (post)modernity and its attendant techno-scientific innovations and alienations, Afrofuturism highlights the Afrodiasporic subject's fundamental role in initiating and producing modernity. In other words, Afrofuturism "reorient[s] history", in part in order to offer counter- or alternative futures. This article can be used as a lens through which to read prominent Afrofuturistic texts, such as Ishmael Reed's Mumbo Jumbo (1972) and Samuel Delany's Stars in My Pocket Like Grains of Sand (1984). The essay is available in the book Boogie Down Predictions: Hip-Hop, Time, and Afrofuturism (Strange Attractor, 2022), edited by Roy Christopher.

== The Otolith Group ==
In 2002, Eshun co-founded with Anjalika Sagar The Otolith Group, its name derived from a structure found in the inner ear that establishes our sense of gravity and orientation. Based in London, the group's work engages with archival materials, with futurity and with the histories of transnationality. The group's projects include film production and exhibition curation as part of an integrated practice with the intended aim to "build a new film culture". The group was nominated for the Turner Prize in 2010 for its project A Long Time Between Suns.

== Publications ==
- More Brilliant than the Sun: Adventures in Sonic Fiction. London: Quartet Books. 1998. ISBN 0-7043-8025-0
- "The Microrhythmic Pneumacosm of Hype Williams" in Cinesonic: cinema and the sound of music, edited by Philip Brophy. Sydney: Australian film, television, and radio school. 2000. ISBN 978-1-876351-09-0
- "Operating System for the Redesign of Sonic Reality" in Audio Culture: Readings in Modern Music, edited by Christoph Cox & Daniel Warner. London: Continuum Books. 2004. ISBN 0-8264-1615-2
- "Learning from Lagos: A Dialogue on the Poetics of Informal Habitation" in David Adjaye: Making Public Buildings: Specificity Customization Imbrication, edited by Peter Allison. London: Thames & Hudson. 2006. ISBN 0-500-28648-5
- "Drawing the Forms of Things Unknown" and "John Akomfrah in conversation with Kodwo Eshun" in The Ghosts Of Songs: The Film Art of The Black Audio Film Collective. Liverpool: Liverpool University Press. 2007. ISBN 978-1-84631-014-0
- Post-Punk Then and Now (co-editor, with Mark Fisher and Gavin Butt). London: Repeater Books. 2016.
