= Franz Pomassl =

Musical artist and DJ

Pomassl

Background information
- Genres: Avant garde Improvisation; Glitch; Noise
- Occupations: Musician; Artist
- Instrument: Homebuilt analog instrumentation
- Labels: Laton; Club Rus; Raster-Noton; Mille Plateaux; Ash International; Sabotage; Nexsound

Pomassl is an electronic sound and recording artist and DJ residing in Vienna, Austria, and is a co-founder of the Austrian Laton experimental techno label.

Pomassl has inspired many other analog and digital electronic artists, including members of Pansonic and Carsten Nicolai, as well as collaborated with a number of important artists across disciplines, including Carl Michael von Hausswolff, J. G. Thirlwell and Kodwo Eshun. In addition to Laton, he has released with seminal electronic labels, such as Raster-Noton, Mille Plateaux, Ash International, Sex Tags Mania, Craft, Sabotage, and Nexsound.

== Methods ==
Pomassl improvises using all manner of homebuilt analog electronic equipment, often inserting or connecting patch cables with parts of his body to introduce a deliberate and violent noise character into dancefloor rhythms.

In addition to being notable for absurd, violent, dadaist performances that satirize the artificial interaction between player and electronic instrument, he also creates custom instrumentation to examine the edges of human-perceptible audio and uses these tools to "elaborate and process radical moments", such as aircraft blackbox data collected from crash sites.

== Discography ==
=== Albums ===
- Skeleton (Austria: Craft/Sabotage, 1995, Craft. 07)
- Skeleton 2 (Austria: Craft/Sabotage, 1997, Craft. 19)
- Trail Error (Austria: Laton, 1997, Laton 006)
- Aircra (Austria: Laton, 1999, Laton 018)
- 2001 (Austria: Laton, 2001, Laton 021)
- Retrial Error (Rmxs + Original) (Austria: Laton, 2002, Laton 011)
- Retrial Error (Rmxs) (Austria: Laton, 2002, Laton 012)
- Amalgama (Austria: Laton, Unreleased, Laton 033)
- Skeleton (Norway: Sex Tags Mania, 2007, MANIA 10)
- Spare Parts (Germany: Raster-Noton, 2007, Raster-Noton R-N088)

=== EPs ===
- Soundtrack #2 (Austria: Ego Vacuum/Sabotage, 1999, Ego 02)

=== Compilations ===
- Picknick mit Hermann! (Austria: Rhiz, 1997, Rhiz 001)
- Clicks & Cuts 3 (Germany: Mille Plateaux, 2002, MP 116 CD)
- Prototype: Armaments And Armatures Against Electronic Music (Austria: Laton, 2003, Laton 025)
- freq_out (UK: Ash International, 2003, Ash 5.8)
- MUTEK 2005 (Canada: Mutek Records, 2005)

=== Collaborations ===
- ARCHITECTRONICS (in collaboration with Kodwo Eshun) (Austria: Craft/Sabotage, 1999, Craft. 38)

== Sound installations ==
- Ohne Titel, 2010 with Peter Kogler, Schirn Kunsthalle, Frankfurt am Main, Germany
- Dreamlands Burn (2006–2007)

Műcsarnok / Kunsthalle Budapest, Budapest, Hungary

- Runaway (2006)

Galéria Priestor for Contemporary Arts, Bratislava, Slovakia

- PORTAL II (2003)

Kunsthalle Fridericianum, Kassel, Germany
Göteborg International Biennial for Contemporary Art, Gothenburg, Sweden

- Avanto (2002)

Muu Galleria, Helsinki, Finland

- Frequenzen Hz - Audiovisuelle Räume (2002)

Schirn Kunsthalle, Frankfurt am Main, Germany

- 10 Ans De Fri-Art - Etat des lieux #3 (2001)

Fri-Art - Centre d'Art Contemporain, Fribourg, Switzerland

- Manifesta 2 - Luxembourg

Manifesta - European Biennial of Contemporary Art, Amsterdam, The Netherlands

== See also ==
- List of Austrians in music
