= Satanicpornocultshop =

Japanese experimental music group

- Origin: Japan
- Genres: Electronic; experimental; techno; bricolage; hip hop; glitch; footwork; juke house
- Years active: 1997–present
- Labels: Some Bizzare; Sonore; Vivo; NuNuLAXNuLAN; neji
- Members: Vinylman; esreko; Frosen Pine; Ikeguchi; waruugaki
- Past members: Alan Folkroe; Gammehuche; Ugh Yoing; Meu-Meu; Lisa Tani; Liftman; Akumadaikon
- Website: satanicpornocultshop.com

Satanicpornocultshop is a Japanese experimental music group making assemblage-style compositions that incorporate a variety of musical styles and techniques. The group draws heavily on hip hop and electronic influences to create "bricolage hip hop" inspired by the theories of Claude Lévi-Strauss. Beginning in the early 2010s, the group began focusing on Juke and Footwork music, influenced by the Chicago scene.

== History ==
The name of the group is an adaptation of an earlier group, Magicpornocultshop, composed of Takuya Karusawa and Yoshibumi Etou. Magicpornocultshop debuted in 1995 on the compilation CD Floating on the 1st Floor from Japanese techno label Trip Trap Records. In 1997, Karusawa started composing under the name Satanicpornocultshop, a group consisting of two of his own aliases: Alan Folkroe and Gammehuche. He retroactively killed off Alan Folkroe, ditching both aliases and started performing in Satanicpornocultshop under the name Ugh Yoing with the release of the self-titled CD Ugh Yoing in August 2002. The group released their first album, Nirvana or Lunch? in 1998, and won Digital Music Honorary Mention from Prix Ars Electronica in 2006. In the same year they won a Qwartz Award and performed in "Le Japon À La Cité de la Musique, Expériences limites" at Cité de la Musique, Paris. In 2007, they performed at Experimentaclub'07, an experimental music festival in Madrid. In 2010, the group signed with Some Bizzare Records and released the album Arkhaiomelisidonophunikheratos. Takuya Karusawa died on August 8, 2018.

== NuNuLAXNuLAN and neji ==
neji is a sublabel of NuNuLAXNuLAN (Satanicpornocultshop's personal label) founded in 2001 which mainly released music on CD-R. The label was adapted and revived from a then-defunct label also called neji (ねじ) (spelled with hiragana) created by the artist Ningen Rocket (Takemi Ikeda). Early neji disks were available from the old NuNuLAXNuLAN domain nunulaxnulan.biz through e-mail order, but it has since gone down. Because these early neji disks were often limited to a small number of copies, the ones that are no longer being sold can be extremely rare.

NuNuLAXNuLAN and neji also feature artists and groups associated with Satanicpornocultshop. These include:

- Gammehuche (Takuya Karusawa)
- Alan Folkroe (Takuya Karusawa)
- swedish☆panic☆porno (Yoshibumi Etou, Takuya Karusawa, Vinylman, EIJIN, Osamu Sogawa, BEN-HAAAA, Sayoko, Hajime Matsui)
- Magicpornocultshop (Takuya Karusawa, Yoshibumi Etou)
- Bossa Bosa (Lisa Tani, Shinya Kageyama)
- H=N=D, a.k.a. Homosexual Napalm Dad (Takuya Karusawa, Vinylman, Comzo)
- Ningen Rocket (Takemi Ikeda)
- Hotentot Apron (Takuya Karusawa)
- Quartet Jazz Grind (Takuya Karusawa, JetSetIshizaka, Takuya Kitagawa)
- Unipue Skeleton (Takuya Karusawa, Yoshibumi Etou, Osamu Sogawa, Souichi Yokoyama, JetSetIshizaka, Ryuuma Fukuda, Ishii 2.8, Ikezoe, Tomita)
- Electric Cafe (Yoshibumi Etou, Sayoko)
- Universal Soldier (Naoyuki Matsumoto, Osamu Sogawa, Ryou Yamamoto, Hiromi Ishikawa, Hisashi Okada)
- chubby flea (James Barrett Heaton)
- Mommoth Baromater (Kozy Shake, Takuya Karusawa, Osamu Sogawa)
- RAW (Battaman, Umeki, Yambow)
- esreko, a.k.a. *es (Osamu Sogawa)
- Seetake
- Ugh Yoing (Takuya Karusawa)
- Dagshenma (Eitero Higuchi)
- bebedelbanco (Taiki, SANgNAM, Comzo, Osamu Sogawa, Takuya Karusawa, Frosen Pine)
- Sovyetskiy Brezhnev (Yoshibumi Etou, Osamu Sogawa)
- Dj*Chola, a.k.a. Meu-Meu (Colas Meulien)
- Orionza, a.k.a. ORRORINZ (Taiki, SANgNAM, Comzo)
- klanqschaft
- Liftman (Tatsuya Nakagawa)
- Asohgi (Junpei Onodera)
- Frosen Pine
- Akumadaikon
- klone7023
- Conceal (Baiyon, Takuya Karusawa)
- waruugaki (Miyuki Nakagaki)

== Members ==
Current members

- Vinylman (Yosuke Imamura) – turntables (2001–present)
- esreko (Osamu Sogawa) – electronics, shehnai (2002–2013, 2018–present)
- Frosen Pine – guitar, MC (2006–present)
- Ikeguchi (Takayoshi Ikeguchi) – video (2012–present)
- waruugaki (Miyuki Nakagaki) – vocals (2018–present)

Former members

- Alan Folkroe (Takuya Karusawa) – electronics, vocals, guitar (1997–2001)
- Gammehuche (Takuya Karusawa) - electronics (1997-2001)
  - Alan Folkroe and Gammehuche were aliases used by Karusawa.
- Ugh Yoing (Takuya Karusawa) – turntables, MC, vocals, guitar (1997–2018)
- Meu-Meu (Colas Meulien) – vocals, video, jew's harp (2002–2005)
- Lisa Tani – vocals (2003–2010)
- Liftman (Tatsuya Nakagawa) – synth, keyboards (2006–2010)
- Akumadaikon – electronics (2010–2022)

== Discography ==
=== Studio albums ===
- Nirvana or Lunch? (CD) nunulaxnulan 1998
- Baltimore 1972 (CD) nunulaxnulan 1999
- Belle Excentrique (CD) nunulaxnulan 2000
- Sirocco (CDR) Inprinting North Release 2002
- Ugh Yoing (CD) nunulaxnulan 2002
- Piss'en Ass (CDR) neji 2003
- Anorexia Gas Balloon (CD) Sonore 2003
- Orochi Under the Straight Edge Leaves (CD) Vivo Records 2005
- Zap Meemees (CD) Sonore 2005
- Takusan No Ohanasan (CD) Vivo Records 2008
- Arkhaiomelisidonophunikheratos (CD) Some Bizzare 2010
- Catholic Sunspot Apron (CD) nunulaxnulan 2010
- an†i-Buddhist♀ (digital) neji 2012
- Battle Creek Brawl (digital) neji 2012
- Picaresque (digital) neji 2013
- Maiden Voyage (digital) neji 2013
- frEEwheelin' (digital) neji 2014
- AtoZ!!!2 (2CD) neji 2014
- The Shipboard Gardener: music for Listening Room at UNYAZI Festival 2014 (digital) neji 2014
- Rob A Grave Vol.1 (digital) neji 2014
- Rob A Grave Vol.2 (digital) neji 2014
- El Día Que Me Quieras (digital) neji 2015
- Faucet Zero (digital) neji 2015
- The Ship With No Cargo: Variations Of 'The Shipboard Gardener' For Voice And Words (digital) neji 2015
- Their Satanic Majesties Sweet Disco Request (digital) neji 2015
- Mystic Island (digital) neji 2016
- Satapo's Pancake Repair (digital) neji 2016
- †he R∉v∉rs∉ of Cre⇒p!ng §h∂doωdrum $cr∉∂m "F!sh F!sh F!sh!!!" (digital) neji 2017
- Gundensan (digital) neji 2017
- Ebony/Ivory (digital) neji 2017
- The Rise And Fall Of... (digital) Zona Musica 2018
- OYASUMI (digital) KOOL SWITCH WORKS 2020
- Scream Block (vinyl) Cult Trax 2021

=== Singles & EPs ===
- Univers (CDR) neji 2002
- Piss Off EP (CDR, EP) Chakra Smile 2003
- Jag Meemees EP (CDR, EP) [ph]uturistic-beatz 2004
- Music For Meu-Meu's Puppet Show (CDR) neji 2005
- .Aiff Skull EP (CD, EP) Vivo Records 2006
- Pope EP (CDR, EP) Vatican Records 2006
- Custom Drum Destroyer EP (CD, EP) disco_r.dance 2007
- Closer EP (CDR, EP) neji 2009
- Tennnojizoo EP (CDR, EP) neji 2010
- Kesalan Patharan EP (digital, EP) UpItUp! 2010
- Nuclear EP (digital, EP) neji 2011
- Hellasick EP (digital, EP) bootytune 2011
- Yudamen EP (digital, EP) neji 2012
- Sunshine Baby Remixes (CDR, Maxi-Single) Booty Tune 2013
- frEE EP (digital, EP) JUKE underground 2014
- Nejirinbou (digital, EP) Dynasty Shit 2014
- Snack EP (digital, EP) neji 2015
- Bloodless (digital, EP) Sidewayz Funk Records 2015
- Kinzoku Bat (digital, EP) KnightWerk Records 2017
- Jimma City Remixes (digital, EP) Metronomicon Audio 2018
- 陰毛バーニングマン666ep (digital, EP) smoke_rec 2018
- Delicious Beats 4 Sale! Vol.1 (digital, EP) KOOL SWITCH WORKS 2018
- New Fuck E.P. (digital, EP) KOOL SWITCH WORKS 2019
- #RIPugh (Live20181222_____extra2020) (digital, Single) anecdote 2020
- W Debby (digital, EP) neji 2021

=== Compilations ===
- The Wire Tapper 10 (CD) The Wire (magazine) 2003
- Unacknowledged Pop-Song Collection Vol.666(CD) XerXes 2003
- 160OR80 (2CD+DVD) Thailand Bookstore 2013
- AtoZ!!!!!AlphabetBusterS!!!!! (2CD) nunulaxnulan 2013
- AtoZ!!!2 (2CD) nunulaxnulan 2014
- Atomic Bomb Compilation Vol. 2 (digital) Atomic Bomb Compilation 2014
- AtoZ3 Around the World in a Day (2CD) nunulaxnulan 2017

== See also ==
- Some Bizzare Records discography
- Qwartz Electronic Music Awards
