= Kvitnu =

Ukrainian record label

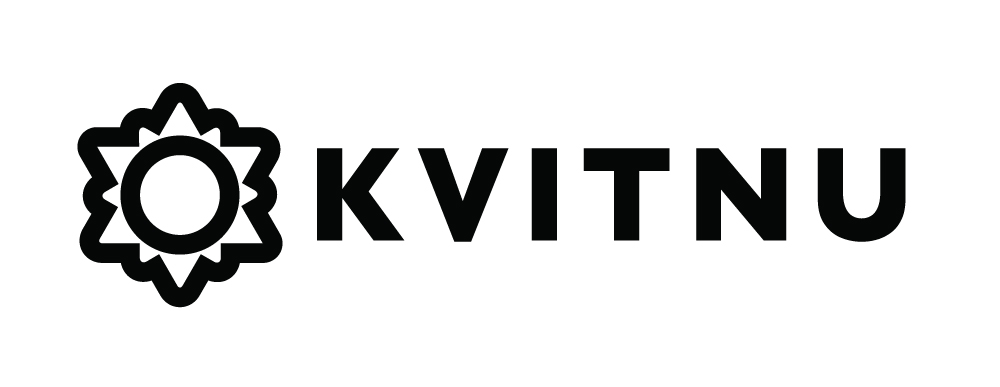
Kvitnu logo

Kvitnu is a Ukrainian label of electronic music.

== History ==
Kvitnu is a Ukrainian record label founded by Dmytro Fedorenko (Kotra) in 2006. Its mission is to showcase experimental electronic music from Ukraine and discover innovative sounds from around the world. Kvitnu focuses on high-energy releases, characterized by intense sonic landscapes, and presents them in unique, eco-friendly cardboard packaging designed by Zavoloka.

Along with releases activity, Kvitnu acts as an organizing structure, searching and bringing out new names in Ukrainian experimental scene, by making regular live-events, festivals and presentations in different cities and venues. The brightest examples of our producing activity are Kvitnu Fest and international Detali Zvuku festival. But together with festivals Kvitnu runs series of smaller events called Kvitnu_live and MicroFormat, where we already invited Scorn, Pan Sonic, Extrawelt, Alexei Borisov, and many other artists.

In 2011 Kvitnu became a winner in three nominations of the Qwartz Electronic Music Awards 7 in Paris – as The Best label, The Best Artist (Sturqen) and Discovery Category (Peste by Sturqen). Also v4w.enko was nominated in Discovery category with his work “Harmonic Ratio”. In 2013, Vitor Joaquim and Dunaewsky69 are respectively nominated for those categories : Experimentation with the album "Filament" et Best Album/EP with the EP "Termination Voice".

In 2020 the label has ceased operations. Its final release was “Silence” by Kotra & Zavoloka.
