= Sara Lunden =

Swedish singer, musician and performance artist

Sara Lunden (born 30 March 1970), performing as Saralunden, is a singer, musician and performance artist. Born in Gothenburg, Sweden, She started out making music and performances around 1997 during her art studies at Royal Institute of Art in Stockholm where she received an MFA. Since the late 1990s she's been developing her own personal musical style mixing influences from disco, schlager, chanson, electronica and minimal wave. Her live performances often involves theatrical costumes and live musicians i.e. "Deadly Boring" where a men's choir, adds a background for her vocals.

== Notable performances ==
- (1997) The Tallest Woman, Royal Academy of Fine Arts. Stockholm
- (1998) Saralunden – The Famous, The Art Brothel, Stockholm
- (1999) Lonely Hearts in the Crowd, Ynglingagatan 1, Stockholm
- (2000) Deadly Boring, Stockholm Art Fair
- (2000) Finalen Galleri Mejan, Stockholm
- (2003) I Took Hormones to Become a Man, Kunsthalle Tallinn & Kulturhuset Stockholm
- (2003) Into Your Head, SOC, Stockholm
- (2004) Great Space, Atalante Gothenburg
- (2004) There Was a Time When Everything Was Alright, Röda Sten, Gothenburg
- (2004) If Anyone Tried Hard Enough, Kilen, Kulturhuset Stockholm
- (2005) Performance, Moderna Museet, Stockholm
- (2006) Das Fleck, Dot Dot Dot Dot, Mossutställningar, Stockholm
- (2006) Sven-Göran Eriksson vs. Phil Spector: Songs of the Freak, Liste Art Fair Basel
- (2007) Drei Liede Für Ein Gehirn, Lilith Performance Studio, Malmö, Sweden.

== Discography ==
- (1998) Surrounded By Men Yet Without them, CD-R
- (2000) Turn Me Over To The Devil, 7" vinyl, Make it happen MKTH-08
- (2001) All Songs Are Sad Songs, CD compilation, Make it happen MKTH-11
- (2003) This Is Not Desire, CD single featuring Tobias Bernstrup Lobotom Records, LOBOTOM03
- (2003) I Will Sun And Spring You Down, CD, Lobotom Records, LOBOTOM06
- (2006) Sweet Sweet Sweet the Beat, CD, Lobotom Records, LOBOTOM22
- (2007) There Was No End, CD mini-album with Andrey Kiritchenko, Nexsound, NSP02
- (2007) Songs of the Freak: Sven Goran Eriksson vs. Phil Spector, CDr mini-album, SHINY001
- (2007) Dubious – with Björkås and Mjös, CD(EP), Nexsound, NSP01
- (2011) Fat Boy featuring Tobias Bernstrup, 12" Vinyl EP, Falco Invernale Records (F.I.R.), FIR005
- (2012) Saralunden – Box Set, 5*LP (Chansons d'Arithmétique, X, Testaments Betrayed, Das Fleck, Musicals), SHINY001-005
- (2013) Suggestive Boy, 12" Vinyl, Gooiland Elektro/Enfant Terrible, Gooiland 13 / ET031
- (2015) HMS Plays Saralunden, Vinyl LP, SHINY006
- (2017) Song for a Sexy Writer,12" Vinyl EP, SHINY007

== Filmography ==
- (1997) Ist das ein Kind?, Super8/Beta
- (1999) Harlem, musical, Super8/Beta, in collaboration with Henry Moore Selder
- (2001) Deadly Boring, musical, 35mm, in collaboration with Henry Moore Selder
- (2002) Hon är död, musical, 35mm B/W, in collaboration with Henry Moore Selder
