= Alla Zahaikevych =

Ukrainian composer

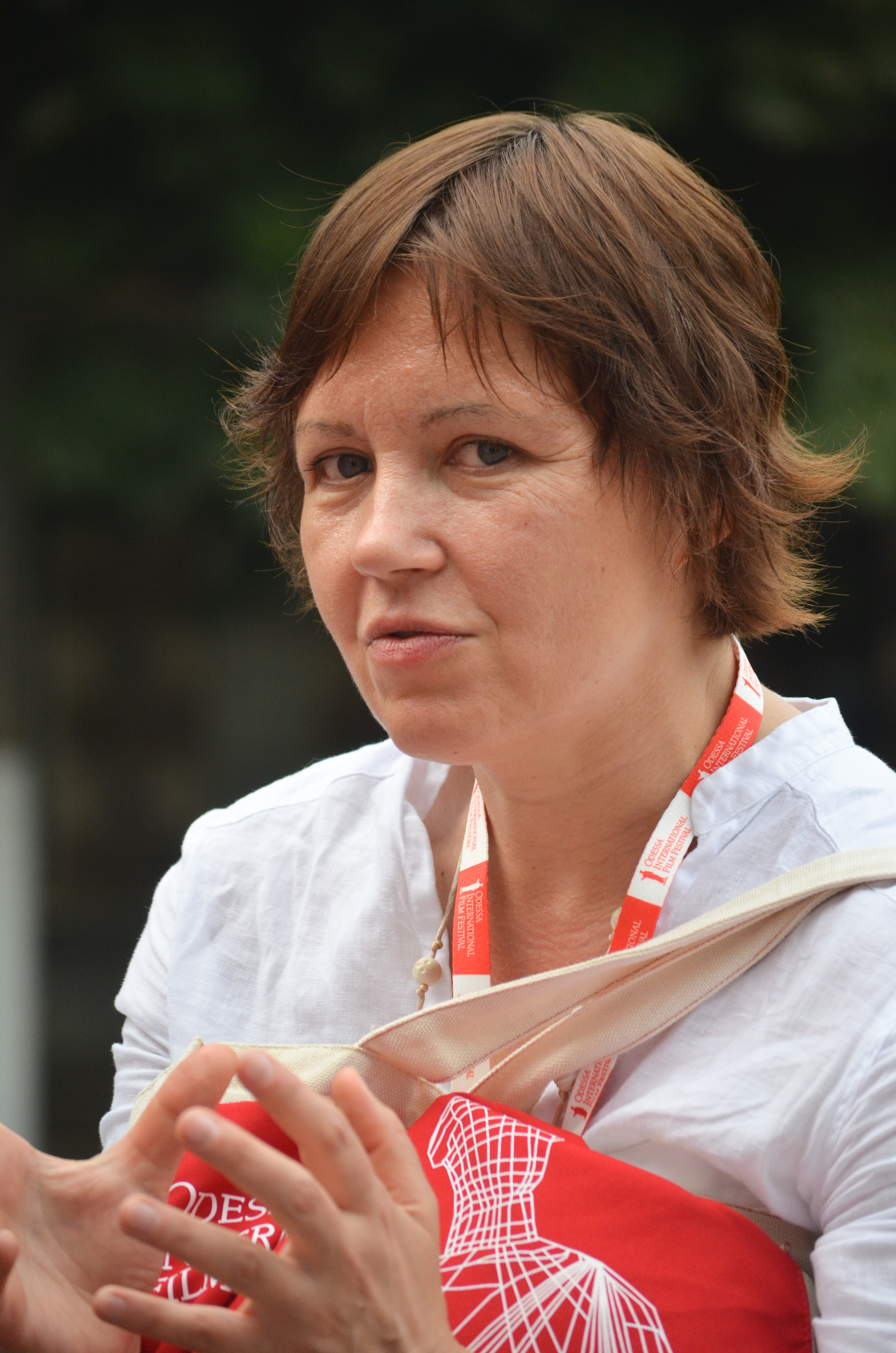
Zagaikevich at the Odesa International Film Festival in 2014

Alla Zahaikevych (Ukrainian: Алла Загайкевич; born 17 December 1966) is a Ukrainian composer of contemporary classical music, performance artist, organiser of electroacoustic music projects, musicologist. Her name is alternatively spelled Alla Zagaykevych on all releases and in texts which are in English.

== Biography ==
Alla Zahaikevych was born in Khmelnytskyi, Ukraine. In 1990 she graduated from the Kyiv Conservatory (now the National Music Academy of Ukraine), having been taught musical composition and orchestration by the Ukrainian composer Yury Ischenko. During 1993–1994 she completed her postgraduate studies in composition with Ischenko and in music theory with I. P’jaskovsky. During 1995 and 1996 she studied composition and musical informatics at the Institut de Recherche et Coordination Acoustique/Musique (IRCAM) in Paris. From 1986 to 1999 she was a member of the folklore ensemble "Drevo" of the National Music Academy of Ukraine, Under the director, Ye.Yefremov, she investigated authentic Ukrainian singing and participated in numerous folkloric expeditions, conferences, and festivals.

In 1998 Zahaikevych became a lecturer at the Music Information Technologies' Department of the National Music Academy of Ukraine in Kyiv, where with the support of the International Renaissance Foundation, she founded the Electronic Music Studio..Her compositions include symphonies, instrumental and vocal chamber music, electro-acoustic compositions, multi-media installations and performances, chamber opera, and film music.

== Selected compositions ==
- Contre S (dedié à Guy Debord) for Kontra-Trio (cb-flute, cb-saxofon, tuba) add electronics (2011)
- Mithe IV : KS (dedicated to Karol Symanowski) for violin and electronics (2011)
- Blicke der Verliebten (for ensemble recherche) for 8 performers (2010)
- Cantos: Island for 3 cello soli and 15 strings (2010)
- Cascades for piano (2009)
- GO for sheng, erhu, percussion and electronic recording (2009)
- String quartet for 2 violins, viola and cello (2009)
- By the Undergroung River for flute, clarinet, oboe, piano, violin, cello (2008)
- Venezia for cello and electronics (2008)
- Tercet for clarinet, violin and cello (2007)
- Luceo for piano (2007)
- Concerto for cello and orchestra (2007)
- Transparency for violin and electronic recording (2006)
- Laborinthus – Exitus for clarinet and electronic recording (2005)
- Air mechanics for flute, clarinet, perc., piano, violin and cello (2005)
- Vent, pierres, fleurs… for accordion (2004)
- Ecce Juventa Anni to text by Grygoriy Skovoroda for soprano, choir and the symphony orchestra (2004)
- Pagode for recorders and electronic recording (2003)
- "The Way to the Great River" on the text by O.Lysheha (in English) for soprano and 8 instrumentalists (fl, ob, cl, prc, p, vn, vl, vc) (2002)
- "Heroneya" for violin, cello, bassoon, piano, electronic recording (2002)
- "Gravitation" for 2 cellos (2001)
- "Choven" on verses by Mykola Vorobjov (in Ukrainian) for soprano, mezzo-soprano and baritone (1999), (instrumental version: "Choven", 2000)
- "Chemins des Ombres" for trombone, percussion and contrabass (1998)
- "Interlude" for flute, clarinet, bassoon, horn, trombone, percussion, piano, violin, alto, cello, double bass (1998)
- "Mar-X-Nevidomist" for soprano and piano (1997)
- "Numbers and Wind" ("Drawings by Memory") chamber opera on verses by Mykola Vorobjov (in Ukrainian) (3 voices, fl, cl, fg, cr, tn, prc – 2, p, vn, vl, vc, cb) (1992–1997)
- "Ausgesetzt auf den Bergen des Herzens..." on verses by Rainer Maria Rilke (in German) for soprano and orchestra (1996)
- "Et dans un long tournoiement j'entrerai dedans l'etang celeste" on poetry by Oleh Lysheha for bassoon, double bass, clarinet/bass clarinet, electronics (1996)
- "Musique Aveugle" for piano and orchestra (1995)
- "Sans l'Eloignement de la Terre" for violin, accordion and guitar (1994)
- "Intermezzo" for symphony orchestra (1993)
- "Trio" for violin, cello and piano (1991)
- "Symphony" on the poetry of Vladimir Mayakovsky (in Russian) for baritone and symphony orchestra (1990)

== Electroacoustic performances and multimedia works ==
- Prostory Svitla (English: Spaces for light): Premiered at the Warsaw Autumn in 2022 and described as "a constantly shifting equilibrium between electronics and orchestra".
- "Musique naïve" (dedicated to CAT trio) performance for accordion, gitare, theremin and electronics (2011)
- "Life as Music" generative in real time composition for Oboe, Clarinet in B, Alto Saxophon, Percussion and Contrebasse (2011)
- "Raven", music for experimental performance piece created by Yara Arts Group (New York) inspired by the poetry by Oleh Lysheha (2011)
- "Contre S (dedié à Guy Debord)" electroacoustic performance for Electroacoustic's Ensemble (2010)
- "Nord/Ouest" electroacoustic performance for folklor voices, violin, flute, percussion and electronics (for Electroacoustic's Ensemble) (2010)
- "While Falling Asleep: To Wake Up.. While Flying Up: To Submerge.." electroacoustic installation in four waves for project «MAVKA» (2009)
- "Sud/Est" electroacoustic performance for Electroacoustic's Ensemble, (video – Vadim Jovich) (2009)
- "Venezia – Vision" electroacoustic performance for cello and electronics, (video – Vadim Jovich), (2008)
- Music for film "Illusion of Existence"(2004)
- "Seasons in the Square" electronic music for audio-visual installation (2004)
- Music for film "MAMAY" (2003)
- "To Escape, to Breathe, to Keep Silence" electronic music for audio-visual installation (2002)
- "Cosi Fan Tutte", electronic music for audio-visual installation (video: O.Plysjuk) (2000)

== Discography ==
- "Motus" 2005
- "To Escape, To Breathe, To Keep Silence" 2006
- "Mavka or Ukraine Still Hasn't Died" 2009
- "Nord / Ouest" (Alla Zagaykevych & Electroacoustic's Ensemble) 2012
- "Secret Thirteen Mix 067" (Sarunas Nakas & Alla Zagaykevych) 2013
- "Disturbance Fields" (Julian Kytasty and Alla Zagaykevych) 2017

== Awards and honors ==
In 2004, Zahaikevych earned the Oleksandr Dovzhenko State Prize. In 2017, she earned a Golden Dzyga award for Best Composer. In 2019, she earned a Filmed in Ukraine (Ukrainian: Знято в Україні) award in the Composer category. In 2022, she earned an award from the I Will Tell International Film Festival in the Best Sound Design category for her work in the film Budynok Slovo (Ukrainian: Будинок Слово). In 2023, she earned a Women in Arts award in the Women in Music category. In 2026, she was honoured with the title Maestra Honoris Causa by the Institute of Sonology at the Royal Conservatoire The Hague.

== Sources ==
=== Further reading ===
- Skrypnyk, G., ed. (2008). "Загайкевич Алла Леонідівна" [Zagaykevich, Alla Leonidivna] (PDF). Encyclopedia of the Music of Ukraine (in Ukrainian). Vol. 2. Kyiv: Publishing House of the Institute of Art History, Folklore and Ethnology of the National Academy of Sciences of Ukraine. p. 107.
