= Martin Simon =

Slovak composer

Martin Simon (born Martin Šimon in Slovakia in 1975) is a composer and guitarist. He coined the phrase "conversational music" to describe his compositional method.

== Biography ==
Simon was raised in Bratislava and began playing the guitar at the age of ten. He received informal training in classical and jazz guitar under the guidance of František Grof, Daniela Kukumbergová, Matúš Jakabčic, Fernando Correa, and Stanislav Počaji. In 1996, Simon was recognized as a laureate of the New Faces of Slovak Jazz award for his original compositions performed with the jazz-rock fusion group Jazzva.

Simon moved to New York City in 1998. He attended Brooklyn College where he received his master's degree in music. Trained in composition performance, and interactive media arts, his mentors included Tania León, Douglas Cohen, Noah Creshevsky, George Brunner, Salim Washington, Amnon Wolman, Miroslaw Rogala and John J.A. Jannone. After graduating, he was appointed assistant professor at Pratt Institute in New York, where he taught music and studio production for animation, film, and digital media.

Simon's music incorporates elements of jazz, rock, classical, contemporary, free improvisation, and world music. He has incorporated avant-garde concepts into his experimental works, electronic compositions, and multimedia interactive art projects.

His early jazz fusion compositions combine jazz elements with electronic instruments, while his later works incorporate Central European musical traditions.

His experimental work has been published by the University Press of America. IHis experimental work includes structures modeled after musical game pieces to allow for performer interaction. He developed a compositional method based on what he calls movable parts, which resembles modular music, though it remains distinct in approach. He defines "conversational music" as an improvised form influenced by the dynamics of spoken conversation.

Slovak Radio featured his conversational music concert in its broadcast series Džez pod pyramídou. He was a guest of the International Society for Improvised Music (ISIM), where he appeared alongside artists such as Pauline Oliveros Oliver Lake, Art Lande, Mazen Kerbaj, Stephen Nachmanovitch, Michael Zerang, Anto Pett, Mark Dresser, Jane Ira Bloom, and members of the AACM.

Simon collaborated with Spanish-Honduran guitarist Astor Escoto on the duet album Escoto & Simon: Collage. His composition Vision of Seven Keystones was a semi-finalist in the instrumental category of the 2011 International Songwriting Competition.

Simon has collaborated with musicians from Europe, the Americas, Asia, Africa, and New Zealand, including David Watson (John Zorn), Paul Steven Ray (Vernon Reid), Salim Washington (Kenny Garret, Anthony Braxton), Chris Bacas (Buddy Rich), Jorge Amorim (Baden Powell, Steve Coleman), Arturo Martinez (José Greco), Alfonso Cid (Pilar Rioja), Peter Basil Bogdanos (Carlota Santana, Noche Flamenca), Carlos Rengifo, Alí Bello (Tito Puente, Eddie Palmieri, Beyoncé), Pedro Ramos (Choro Ensemble, Wynton Marsalis), Scott Kettner (Willie Nelson, Klezmatics), Neil Ochoa (David Byrne), Carlos Hayre, Borek Suchánek and Divadlo PIKI, among others. He was a member of the New York Mandolin Orchestra and BC Electro-acoustic Music Ensemble. He has collaborated with film and digital media artists like Miroslaw Rogala, Anat Inbar, SangHee Ann, Elizabeth Whalley, David Reeder. He is a founding member of groups Jazzva, Escoto & Simon, Areíto, BTY Orchestra, Convers Club, Astro Latin project, and Slavicada.

== Notes and reviews ==
MARTINÁKOVÁ, Z.: Mladá slovenská skladateľská generácia – štýlové a názorové orientácie. In: Slovenská hudba 36, 2010/1, s. 27–62

SIMON, M. - CRESHEVSKY, N.: Music Through Conversation. In: ArtCircles: C Collaborative, New York 2005/7-8

HOUP, S.: A Beaver and an Eagel meet in the Bar. In: Globe and Mail, Toronto 2004, 29. 5.

IOAN, R.: Computer Music din Europa si S.U.A. In: Observator Cultural, Bukurešť 1, 2004

POKOJNÁ, K.: Soozvuk. In: Hudobný život, Bratislava 2004/7-8, s. 15

IOAN, R.: Nova Musica Consonante 2003/Computer Music. In: Actualitatea Muzicala, Bukurešť 2004/1

VACHOVÁ, Z.: Jazzové Vianoce. In: Infojazz 1998/1, s. 6

SITA: Súťažná prehliadka Jazzové Vianoce 97. In: Mesto.Sk, Nitra 1997, 8. 12.

KAJANOVÁ, Y.: Jazzové vianoce 1996. In: Hudobný život, Bratislava 1997/1

OKRUCKÝ, S.: Vydarená prehliadka džezových talentov. In: Pravda, Bratislava 1996
