= Marco Oppedisano =

American guitarist and composer (born 1971)

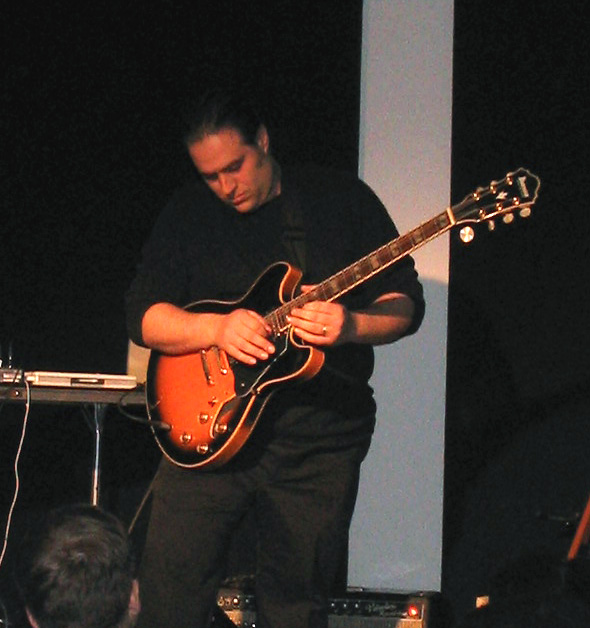

Background information
- Born: November 20, 1971 (age 54)
- Origin: Brooklyn, New York, United States
- Genres: Experimental music, electronic music, Electroacoustic music acousmatic music
- Occupations: Musician, Guitarist, Composer, Instructor
- Instrument: Guitar
- Years active: 1992 - Present
- Labels: OKS Recordings of North America (defunct), Bridge Records, Inc., Spectropol Records, Mutable Music, Capstone Records, Tzadik Records, EM Records (Japan) Clean Feed Records 577 Records)

Marco Oppedisano (born November 20, 1971, in Brooklyn, New York) is an American guitarist and composer whose compositions focus on the innovative use of electric guitar in the genre of electroacoustic music. His musique concrète/acousmatic music compositions have utilized multitrack recording and extended performance techniques for electric guitar, nylon string guitar and electric bass. In addition to musique concrète, compositions by Oppedisano also consist of "live" electric guitar in combination with a fixed playback of various electronic, acoustic (specifically female voice courtesy of Kimberly Fiedelman) and sampled sounds.

Oppedisano has also composed works for solo classical guitar, solo electric guitar and mixed ensemble.

== Biography ==
Oppedisano began playing guitar at the age of 12 and was primarily a rock guitarist before entering studies at the Conservatory of Music at Brooklyn College. After two years of classical guitar study at Brooklyn College, he completed composition studies there with Tania León, Charles Dodge, Noah Creshevsky (Hyperrealism (music)) and George Brunner.

Oppedisano completed graduate studies at the Aaron Copland School of Music at Queens College obtaining his master's degree in Music Composition. There he studied with Henry Weinberg and Thea Musgrave. Oppedisano is also a certified New York State P-12 Music teacher.

From 1999 to 2003, as a member of the Conservatory of Music at Brooklyn College Electroacoustic Ensemble, Oppedisano worked at the Brooklyn College Center for Computer Music (BC-CCM) to composeelectroacoustic music focusing on sounds derived only from electric guitar and electric bass. From 2003–present, Oppedisano has exclusively worked out of his home recording studio in Queens, NY. He is a certified NYS music teacher and was also employed as an adjunct professor at the Conservatory of Music at Brooklyn College. He currently teaches Guitar, Modern Band, and Advanced Placement Music Theory at the high school level.

Since 2002, he has also had ensemble works performed by the New York City Guitar Orchestra, Quarto Ensamble (Chile), Esart Quartet, Fireworks Ensemble, Glass Farm Ensemble, Brooklyn College Percussion Ensemble (directed by Morris Lang), Zyryab Guitar Quartet and solo guitar compositions performed by Kevin R. Gallagher and Oren Fader. As a guitarist he has performed in compositions by notable composers/guitarists, Nick Didkovsky and Glenn Branca.

Oppedisano's electroacoustic music with guitars has been used in film and was included in UK feature film "Besides These Walls" (2017), directed by Jules Bishop. "Besides These Walls" won Best Actor and Best Narrative Feature at the 2018 Queens World Film Festival. Oppedisano's music was also use in the short film, Dead Man Rides Subway by Don Cato. Dead Man Rides Subway was premiered in March 2012 at The Queens World Film Festival and was the Grand Prize Winner at the Roxy Underground Film Festival in New York City in 2018.

Oppedisano presently lives in Forest Hills, Queens with his wife Kimberly Fiedelman and daughter, Jillian Maisie Oppedisano (born July 2010).

== Discography ==
- Evening Sky (EP) - (2022: Out Your Ear)
- Selected Works (1999 - 2017): Acoustic, electric and electroacoustic music with guitar (2021: Out Your Ear)
- Resolute (EP) (dedicated to Jillian Maisie Oppedisano) - Spectropol Records - (2015: SpecT - 37)
- Mechanical Uprising - OKS Recordings of North America - (2010: OKSRNA - 019)
- The Ominous Corner - OKS Recordings of North America - (2008: OKSRNA - 016)
- Tesla at Coney Island with David Lee Myers - OKS Recordings of North America - (2008: OKSRNA - 017)
- Electroacoustic Compositions for Electric Guitar - OKS Recordings of North America - (2007: OKSRNA - 007)

== Selected contributions ==
- Spectra: New Music for Guitar Orchestra, "Two of a Kind," Various Artists (2024: New Focus Recordings, ReEntrant ren10
- Celestial Marketplace, Feeding Goats (2022: Feeding Goats)
- Walk My Way, "Klang," Various Artists, Vol. 2 of 5 (2021: 577 Records/ORBIT577 OR5012)
- COVID - ?, "Covid - 81," Various Artists (2020: Marco Oppedisano - Christian Vasseur - France)
- Sounds Exposed, Minds Without Frontiers, "Yawp," Various Artists (2019: GC Sound Artifacts GCSA 27)
- Quarto Ensamble: Música para Cuarteto de Guitarras Eléctricas, "Good News," Various Artists (2018: Chile)
- I NEVER METAGUITAR FOUR, "Watch Your Step," Various Artists (2017: Clean Feed Records: CFG009CD)
- Hyperrealist Music, 2011-2015, Noah Creshevsky (2015: EM Records (Japan) EM1140CD)
- Dreamshatterer 3, Dreamshatterer (2014) (Recording Engineer and Performer)
- The Four Seasons, Noah Creshevsky (2013: Tzadik Records - 8097)
- $100 Guitar Project, "Red Cent," Various Artists (2013: Bridge Records, Inc.: BRIDGE 9381A/B)
- Axe, "Fractured Sky," Various Artists (2012: Spectropol Records: SpekT 12)
- The Unraveling Begins, "From Here To Obliquity" with Infinite Ego (Mark Worrell) Various Artists:(2008: GtrOblq)
- Post-Minimalism: 4 Countries/19 Composers, "Steel Sky," Various Artists (2007:(France): Trace 024 / 2CD)
- First Flight, "Primo Volo," Oren Fader (2005) (also Producer, Editor and Mastering Engineer)
- Vox Novus 2003 60x60, "The End is Near," Various Artists (2004: Capstone Records: CPS-8744)
- Hyperrealism, "Hoodlum Priest (with Thomas Buckner)," Noah Creshevsky (2003: Mutable Music: 17516–2)

== Dedications ==
- "snapshots (for Noah Creshevsky)" (2003: Revised and remastered in 2020)

== Publications ==
- La chitarra elettrica nella musica da concerto: La storia, gli autori, i capolavori (Italian Edition) (October 2019 - Arcana - ISBN 978-8862316996) by Sergio Sorrentino
- Visionary Guitars: Chatting With Guitarists (Andrea Aguzzi, March 2016 - ISBN 978-1326586935) by Andrea Aguzzi
- State of The Axe: Guitar Masters in Photographs and Words (Museum Fine Arts Houston, October 2008 - ISBN 978-0300142112) by Ralph Gibson

== Film music ==
- "T'es OUT" (2025). Film short directed by Marie-Louise Gariepy
- "Dead Man Rides Subway" (2011). Film short directed by Don Cato
- "Besides These Walls" (2017). Feature Film directed by Jules Bishop

== Selected interviews and reviews ==
- "Marco Oppedisano, Reviews of Electroacoustic Compositions for Electric Guitar and The Ominous Corner by Darren Bergstein, Downtown Music Gallery NYC newsletter, May 7, 2021.
- "Marco Oppedisano, Resolute," Prepared Guitar, December 3, 2015
- "Interview with Marco Oppedisano," Tokafi, October 22, 2014
- "300 Essential Names in Modern Guitar through 300 Interviews," Prepared Guitar Blog, April 26, 2014
- "Interview with Marco Oppedisano," Guitar Moderne, August 25, 2013
- "A Generic Guitar Inspires a Distinctive Project," New York Times, April 2, 2013 (in photo - far left, rear)
- Reviews of music by Marco Oppedisano by The Stash Dauber (2012-2022)
- "Interview with Marco Oppedisano," Guitar-Muse, October 12, 2012
- Review of Mechanical Uprising by Massimo Ricci, Touching Extremes, April 11, 2011
- Reviews of Electroacoustic Compositions for Electric Guitar, The Ominous Corner, Mechanical Uprising and Tesla at Coney Island by Mark S. Tucker, FAME, December 2010, FAME, March 2011
- Reviews by François Couture, Monsieur Délire, December 20, 2010
- Review of Mechanical Uprising by Tobias Fischer, Tokafi, September 15, 2010
