= Kalvos & Damian New Music Bazaar =

Kalvos & Damian New Music Bazaar is a contemporary new music program hosted by Kalvos and Damian, the alter egos of the composers Dennis Bathory-Kitsz and David Gunn. Beginning in 1995, the program aired for over 10 years on Goddard College's radio station WGDR 91.1 FM Plainfield, Vermont and is now archived on the Internet.

A "normal" show consisted of 2 hours playing contemporary new music works, fiction, and an interview of a new music personality. The show began with host, David Gunn, narrating his serialized fiction in the beginning. Afterwards they would play several contemporary works, a genre they dub as "non-pop". This would include works of their featured quest for that show.

The New York Times comments that "Kalvos and Damian's New Music Bazaar (www.kalvos.org) continually document the breadth and vivacity of American musical creativity in a way that, given its relatively tiny audience, no concert promoter or station manager could possibly afford."

Kalvos & Damian New Music Bazaar has interviewed hundreds of composers; some notable guests include: Laurie Anderson, Eve Beglarian, David Behrman, Rhys Chatham, Noah Creshevsky, David Del Tredici, Eric Salzman, Christopher DeLaurenti, Daniel Goode, Tom Hamilton, Joan LaBarbara, Mary Jane Leach, Paul Moravec, David Morneau, John McGuire, Maggi Payne, Larry Polansky, Pauline Oliveros, Marco Oppedisano, Frank J. Oteri, Elliott Schwartz, Laurie Spiegel, Carl Stone, James Tenney, Michael Torke, Robert Voisey, Peter Zummo, and many others.

Kalvos & Damian has also been host to the 60x60 project's Radio Request Extravaganza.

== Articles and Reviews ==
- Retuning the Dial: Rethinking the Relationship between Radio and New American Music NewMusicBox Published: May 1, 2000
- Sound Bytes of Truth by Kyle Gann, Village Voice July 6, 1999
