= Hyperrealism (music) =

Hyperrealism is a term coined by the composer Noah Creshevsky to describe a musical language for his and his colleagues' compositional aesthetic. Creshevsky defines hyperrealism as "an electroacoustic musical language constructed from sounds that are found in our shared environment ('realism'), handled in ways that are somehow exaggerated or excessive ('hyper')."

== Articles and reviews ==
- "STUFF MUZAK #1: A (VERY) SOFT FOCUS ON HYPERREALIST MUSIC" by Dwight Pavlovic, Decoder Magazine, June 7, 2016
- "Twilight of The Gods" by Allan Kozinn, The New York Times, June 18, 2010
- "Consistent lines: Creshevsky clearly builds his own reality.", by Tobias Fischer, "Tokafi", November 30, 2007
- "A Language We Already Understand: Noah Creshevsky's Hyperrealism" by Dennis Báthory-Kitsz, "NewMusicBox", June 13, 2007
- "Hyperrealism, Hyperdrama, Superperformers and Open Palette" by Noah Creshevsky, "Kalvos & Damian New Music Bazaar", 2005
- "Slice 'N' Dice" by Kyle Gann, Village Voice, July 6, 2004
- "Traveling Through Hyperreality With Umberto Eco", "Transparency"
- ,https://not.neroeditions.com/archive/orange-milk-records-elettronica-iperrealista/ by Riccardo Papacci, Not, December 5, 2018

== See also ==
- Hyperreality (art)
- Hyperrealism
- Hyperdrama
