= Judy Klein =

American classical composer (born 1943)

Judy Klein (born 14 April 1943, in Chicago) is an American composer, music educator. She is the founder of the Computer Music Studio at New York University and served as its director in 1980's. Her music is primarily acousmatic, and includes works for the electronic medium, sound installations, music for theatre and collaborations with visual artists.

== Education ==
Judy Klein earned her Bachelor in Arts at the University of California, Berkeley (1967), and continued her studies at the Music Academy in Basel, Switzerland (Diploma, 1977). She graduated with a Master of Arts degree from New York University (1987), after studying with Thomas Kessler, Reynold Weidenaar, Lilli Friedemann and Ruth Anderson. She continued her studies in computer generated music at the Brooklyn College Center for Computer Music with Charles Dodge.

== Musical career ==
Klein began teaching electro-acoustic music composition at New York University (SEHNAP) in 1985, and later founded and directed the New York University Computer Music studio. She has served as a consultant for the New York Public Library for the Performing Arts (Lincoln Center) where she worked to create the Library's Archive of Electro-Acoustic Music (1990–2006). She has been an artist-in-residence at places such as Bregman Studio at Dartmouth College, The Brooklyn College Center for Computer Music, Elektronische Musik Studio in Basle, Switzerland, Institute of Electroacoustic Music (Bourges, France), and guest composer and lecturer at Brooklyn College Center for Computer Music, the Cincinnati College Conservatory, and the Computer Music Center at Columbia University, among others.

Klein composes almost exclusively in the C programming language and the C sound computer music language. Her works are primarily acousmatic and increasingly combine her interest in sound with her commitment to animal rights, which she speaks about in an interview with Peter Shea about her piece “The Wolves of Bays Mountain”, as well as other aspects of her work. She currently resides in New York City and serves on juries and selections committees for electroacoustic music competitions, festivals and conferences. She is a member of the Steering Committee for the New York City Electroacoustic Music Festival and is a contributing editor for The Open Space Magazine and for Perspectives of New Music. Her music is recorded on ICMA, SEAMUS, Cuneiform and Open Space compact discs.

== Musical works ==
Selected works include:

- Dead End (1979) – tape
- Little Piece (1979) – tape
- Dream/Song (1980) – tape
- Journeys (1982) – tape, art installation; collaboration with B. Nathan
- God Bites (1983) – tape
- The Mines of Falun, pt 1 (1983) – tape
- The Tell-Tale Heart (1983) – film score; directed by H. Marti
- From the Journals of Felix Bosonnet (1987) – tape; Performed at the 1989 International Computer Music Conference
- Elements 1.1: sulphur, phosphorus; diamond (1992) – tape
- 88” for Nick (1992) – tape
- Elements 1.2 (1993) – sound installation; collaboration with C. Furukawa and N. Yatsuyanagi
- The Wolves of Bays Mountain (1998) – tape
- Railcar (2008)

== Discography ==
- The Wolves of Bays Mountain, Open Space 15 #OS015 – 2004
- From the Journals of Felix Bosonnet, ICMC 1989 #38161665; Christoph Gaugler, reader – 1989
- 88” for Nick, Transforms: The Nerve Events Project, Cuneiform Records #43302512- 1993
- Elements 1.1: sulphur, phosphorus; diamond, Music from SEAMUS vol. 4 (digital re-issue from 1994) – 2022
- Railcar, Music from SEAMUS vol. 20 – 2011
