= Irritable Hedgehog Music =

- Founded: 2010
- Founder: David D. McIntire
- Genre: Minimalism, postminimalism, electroacoustic
- Country of origin: U.S.
- Location: Kansas City, Missouri
- Official website: www.irritablehedgehog.com

Irritable Hedgehog Music is a Kansas City-based record label, focused primarily on minimalist and electroacoustic music.

== History ==
Irritable Hedgehog Music was original organized as the publishing imprint for David D. McIntire's compositions. The impetus for moving into the recording industry was a performance of Tom Johnson's An Hour for Piano by R. Andrew Lee in May 2009. Recalls McIntire, “My wife and I were there and driving home I said, ‘You know, I think Andy plays that as well as anyone in the world. He owns that piece in a really amazing way.’ And she said, ‘Well I think he should record it, and you should produce it.’ I was startled by the idea, but as I let it sink in I thought, ‘You know, I should.’”

Realization of that recording would take over a year, but on 30 October 2010, Irritable Hedgehog released their first commercial recording, "Tom Johnson: An Hour for Piano." Since that time, their catalog has grown to include several CD releases as well as digital releases.

== CD Releases ==
Manfred Werder: Stück 1998 - Released 19 October 2015. This realization by Chilean guitarist Cristián Alvear represents pages 676-683 of this 4000 page work by Manfred Werder.

Jay Batzner: as if to each other - Released 21 July 2015. The premiere recording of Jay Batzner's "as if to each other..." for piano and fixed electronics.

Memory and Weather - Released 13 February 2015. This is the debut album by the Ensemble of Irreproducible Outcomes (EIO), which features David D. McIntire (clarinet, tenor saxophone, ocarina, electronics), Ryan Oldham (trumpet, flugelhorn, objects, whistling) and Brian Padavic (double bass, whistling).

Jürg Frey: Pianist, Alone - Released 30 September 2014. This is the second album of Frey's music recorded by R. Andrew Lee, featuring two works: pianist, alone (1) and pianist, alone (2). The latter having been written specifically for Lee.

Dave Seidel: ~60 Hz - Released 25 February 2014. An album of electroacoustic music by composer Dave Seidel.

Electronic Music Midwest - Released 11 November 2013. This is an album of electroacoustic music by composers associated with Electronic Music Midwest.

Eva-Maria Houben: Piano Music - Released 15 October 2013. This CD features two previously unrecorded works of Wandelweiser composer Eva-Maria Houben: Abgemalt and go and stop. This album was selected by Alex Ross of The New Yorker as one of 10 Notable Classical Recordings of 2013.

Landscape of Descent - Released 25 June 2013. 'Landscape' is an electroacoustic piece composed by David D. McIntire based on a short sampling of high-pitched bells.

Dennis Johnson: November - Released 18 March 2013. November, written in 1959, is perhaps the first minimalist composition every composed. This is the first commercial recording of this nearly five-hour-long piece. This album was selected by Steve Smith as the top classical album of 2013 for Time Out NY.

Jürg Frey: Piano Music - Released 13 November 2012. This CD features two previously unrecorded works of Wandelweiser composer Jürg Frey: Klavierstück 2 and les tréfonds inexplorés des signes pour piano (24-35).

Queen of Heaven - Released 31 January 2012. Another premier recording, this EP features music composed by Scott Blasco and is performed by pianist Kari Johnson, who commissioned the work. Based in Catholic and Orthodox theology, this piece for piano and electronics reflects on five different aspects of the Virgin Mary.

William Duckworth: The Time Curve Preludes - Released 18 October 2011. This was the second complete recording of The Time Curve Preludes, following the premier recording for Lovely Music, and also follows Bruce Brubaker's recording of Book I for Arabesque. One notable aspect of the recording is that it allows the sustained tones (created by small weights place on certain keys) to die away completely, more closely mirroring a live performance.

Ann Southam: Soundings for a New Piano - Released 9 August 2011. This was the first commercial release of Southam's Soundings for a New Piano: 12 Meditations on a Twelve Tone Row, which was composed for Jane Blackstone in March 1986. The piece is another example of Southam's pervasive 12-tone row (featured in out pieces such as Simple Lines of Enquiry), and combines serial and minimalist composition techniques.

Tom Johnson: An Hour for Piano - Released 30 October 2010. This marked the third recording of An Hour for Piano, with the first being Frederic Rzewski's original 1979 release, subsequently released on CD in 2000, and Jeroen van Veen's recording as part of his Minimal Piano collection, released in 2007. This was the first commercial release of the piece that was exactly one hour long, as is indicated by the score.

== Digital Releases ==
Along with CD releases, Irritable Hedgehog has put out a number of digital-only albums and tracks, many of which are free to download. The consist of almost exclusively of David McIntire's electroacoustic compositions and field recordings, with the exception of the Putney Project.

- one gate, one hundred paths, one arrival (for John Cage), 2013+
- Chronomosaic+
- Maps Without Grids, 1992+
- Hommage á Nancarrow, 1992
- Arcadia Landscape, 2000+
- Landscape of Retrieval, 2004+
- unhurried, untitled, 1985, rev. 2010
- Longbow Creek, 2010
- J.T. Fraser Appointed Official Timekeeper of Ongoing Achilles v. Tortoise Footrace (In Memoriam), 2011+
- P'lique, 2011+

+ indicates free download

== Putney Project ==
The Putney Project came about as a result of two separated experiences. The first was McIntire's early exposure to the EMS VCS-3, an odd English synthesizer known as the "Putney," while the second was the 60x60 concerts. The 60x60 concerts, curated by Robert Voisey, each featuring 60 works by 60 different composers that are one minute in length.

As an undergraduate, McIntire recorded several improvisations with this synthesizer and invited others to compose their own pieces based on these raw materials. All invited were encouraged to use the material as they saw fit. As the invitation states, "There are no restrictions as to length or how you use it. Re-mix, re-mash. Add beats. Subtract overtones, add undertones. Overdub guitar solos. Layer in twelve tubas. Put it in a blender and hit "frappé." Whether your approach is subtle and sophisticated or brute-force and grungy, it's all good."

The first volume was released on 3 January 2012, featuring works by Ken Frank, David Morneau, Alexander Hogan, Phillip Marshall, Jack Smith, and Scott Unrein

The second volume was released on 22 May 2012, featuring works by Steve Gisby, Christopher Biggs, Jonathan Robertson, Audrey Valentine, and John Chittum.

== Artist and Composer Roster ==
- Cristián Alvear, guitarist
- Jay Batzner, composer
- Christopher Biggs, composer
- Scott Blasco, composer
- Jason Bolte, composer
- George Brunner, composer
- John Chittum, composer
- Kyong Mee Choi, composer
- Greg Dixon, composer
- William Duckworth, composer
- Paul Epstein, composer
- Jürg Frey, composer
- Ken Frank, composer
- Steve Gisby, composer
- Alexander Hogan, composer
- Eva-Maria Houben, composer
- Dennis Johnson
- Kari Johnson, pianist
- Tom Johnson, composer
- R. Andrew Lee, pianist
- Elainie Lillios, composer
- Phillip Marshall, composer
- Mike McFerron, composer
- David D. McIntire, composer, performer
- David Morneau, composer
- Ryan Oldham, composer, performer
- Brian Padavic, bassist
- Michael Pounds, composer
- M. Anthont Reimer, composer
- Jonathan Robertson, composer
- Paul Rudy, composer
- Dave Seidel, composer
- Jack Smith, composer
- Ann Southam, composer
- Scott Unrein, composer
- Audrey Valentine, composer
- Robert Voisey, composer
- Manfred Werder, composer
