= R. Andrew Lee =

- Born: May 10, 1982 (age 43)
- Genres: Minimal music
- Instrument: Piano
- Years active: 2010–present
- Label: Irritable Hedgehog Music
- Website: randrewlee.com

R. Andrew Lee (born 1982, in Excelsior Springs, Missouri) is an American pianist of contemporary classical music, with a particular emphasis on Minimal music and music of the Wandelweiser collective. He has recorded ten albums for Irritable Hedgehog Music.

== Education ==
R. Andrew Lee received a BM in piano performance from Truman State University in 2004, where he studied under Dr. David McKamie. He continued his education in piano performance at the University of Missouri-Kansas City, where he met David McIntire, with whom he would eventually help launch Irritable Hedgehog Music. Lee cites McIntire as having introduced him to William Duckworth's The Time Curve Preludes, which sparked his interest in minimalist music. Lee received his MM in 2006 and his DMA in 2011 from UMKC.

== Career ==
R. Andrew Lee began his career as Artist-in-Residence at Avila University in Kansas City, Missouri in January 2009. On 30 October 2010, he released his first album with Irritable Hedgehog Music, Tom Johnson: An Hour for Piano. This album, the first recording of An Hour for Piano to be exactly one hour, also marked the first release for Irritable Hedgehog.

In August 2011, Lee took a position at Regis University in Denver, Colorado, becoming the Associate University Minister for Liturgical & Sacred Music. There he oversees music for liturgical celebrations while also teaching in the music department.

Lee continued to record for Irritable Hedgehog, garnering increasing attention from critics. His third album, William Duckworth: The Time Curve Preludes was named by a 2012 Critics' Choice by Gramophone Magazine. His fifth album, Dennis Johnson: November was named by Steve Smith of Time Out NY as the best classical album of 2013, and his sixth album, Eva-Maria Houben: Piano Music was selected by Alex Ross of The New Yorker as one of ten notable classical recordings of 2013.

Lee has performed across the United States, including cities such as Seattle, Los Angeles, Denver, Austin, Chicago, Boston and New York. He has also performed abroad in Canada, England, France, Belgium, and Italy.

As a performer, Lee has taken an interest in music of an extended duration, performing and commissioning works that are often multiple hours long.

== Writing ==
The intersection of temporality is a primary research avenue for R. Andrew Lee, having published work with the CeReNeM Journal. Lee also writes reviews and opinion pieces for NewMusicBox and I CARE IF YOU LISTEN.

== Personal life ==
Lee currently resides in Denver, Colorado, with his wife and three children. He takes "grilling and drinking seriously" and also notes a "penchant for interesting socks."

== Discography ==
- Michael Waller: Moments - 2019
- Bryan Christian: Each Flows Into the Other - Irritable Hedgehog Music, 2019
- Randy Gibson: Equal D under Resonating Apparitions of The Eternal Process in The Midwinter Starfield 16 VIII 10 (Kansas City) - Irritable Hedgehog Music, 2017
- Michael Waller: Trajectories - 2017 (with Seth Parker Woods, cello)
- Gibson Knight EP - 2017
- Erik Satie: By and After Satie - 2017
- Ryan Oldham: Inner Monologues - Irritable Hedgehog Music, 2017
- Adrian Knight: Obsessions - Irritable Hedgehog Music, 2016
- Paul A. Epstein: Piano Music - Irritable Hedgehog Music, 2015
- Jay Batzner: as if to each other - Irritable Hedgehog Music, 2015
- Jürg Frey: Pianist, Alone - Irritable Hedgehog Music, 2014
- Eva-Maria Houben: Piano Music - Irritable Hedgehog Music, 2013
- Dennis Johnson: November - Irritable Hedgehog Music, 2013
- Jürg Frey: Piano Music - Irritable Hedgehog Music, 2012
- William Duckworth: The Time Curve Preludes - Irritable Hedgehog Music, 2011
- Ann Southam: Soundings for a New Piano - Irritable Hedgehog Music, 2011
- Tom Johnson: An Hour for Piano - Irritable Hedgehog Music, 2010
