= Dennis Báthory-Kitsz =

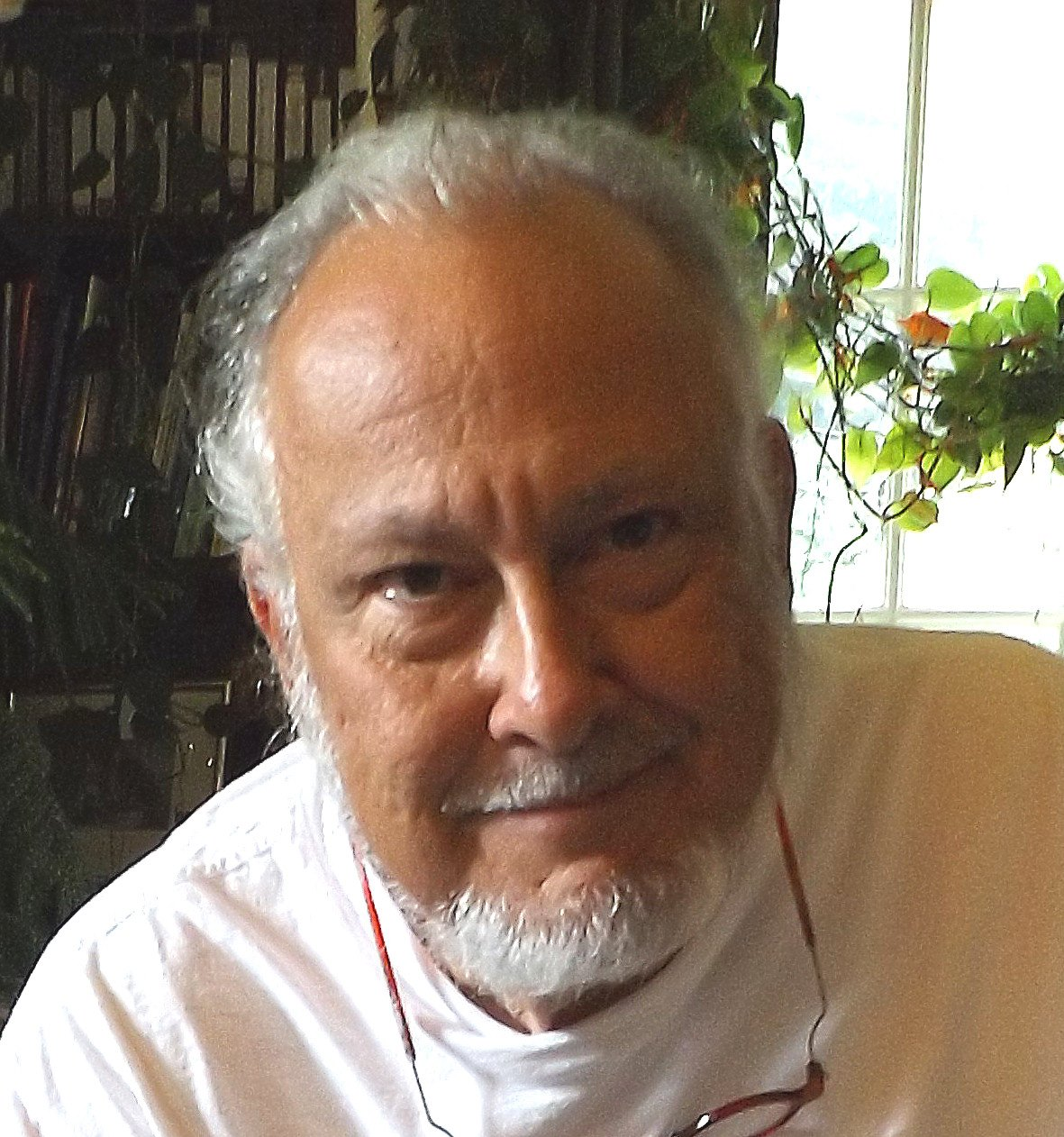

Background information
- Born: March 14, 1949 (age 77)
- Origin: Plainfield, New Jersey
- Genre: Modern Classical
- Occupations: Composer, author, editor, teacher, technologist
- Years active: 1970–present
- Website: Official site

Dennis Báthory-Kitsz (born March 14, 1949, in Plainfield, New Jersey) (pseudonyms: Dennis Bathory, Dennis Kitsz, Dennis J. Kitsz, Dennis Bathory Kitsz, Kalvos Gesamte, Grey Shadé, D.B. Cowell, Brady Kynans, Kalvos Zondrios, Báthory Dénes, Orra Maussade, Don Johnson, Kerry Merritt, Calvin Dion, Enimtu Bemanyna) is a Hungarian-American author and composer.

Aside from music, he was an author during the first generation of personal computers (1979–85), and interviewed Bill Gates. His career in technology is evident in over 600 articles and books on the subject. He was involved in the post-Fluxus art movement (1973–78), and was also director of Vermont's Alliance of Independent Country Stores (2001–2010). Since 2010 he has been adjunct professor composition, theory, and music technology at Johnson State College.

Báthory lives in Northfield, Vermont. He claims to be a descendant of the Báthory family, a prominent central European clan during the Middle Ages but no proof of this can be found.

== Music and works ==
A prolific composer, Báthory-Kitsz has more than 1,100 compositions, sound installations, and electronic works for all manner of vocal and instrumental combinations. His compositions include sound sculpture, solo and chamber music for the instruments of classical music, electronic music, stage shows, orchestral pieces, dance music, opera, interactive multimedia, sound installations, and performance art events. He has also designed and built new musical instruments. Over the years he has earned 28 ASCAP Awards for his works.

Báthory has advocated what he calls contemporary "non-pop" music, and the performance of contemporary classical music (new music) in preference to the music of composers of past eras. He offers his compositions to be downloaded and played for free, but does not release them into the public domain and takes royalties for public performance as usual. His organ work Yer Attention, Please has been performed by Kevin Bowyer. His Dashuki Music Theatre has performed at Charlotte Moorman's Annual Avant Garde Festival of New York.

Although primarily self-taught, Clarence Barlow was his only composition teacher.

=== Kalvos & Damian ===
Dennis Báthory-Kitsz is known for co-founding and co-hosting Kalvos & Damian New Music Bazaar with the composer David Gunn. Kalvos & Damian's New Music Bazaar was an ASCAP/Deems Taylor Award-winning radio/web program that ran 537 shows from 1995-2005.

=== Ought-One festival ===
Dennis Báthory-Kitsz also founded and organized the Ought-One festival.

=== We Are All Mozart ===
The We Are All Mozart project (WAAM) demanded a finished commissioned composition each day in year 2007. Not a complete success the project received a 100 commissions which Dennis Báthory-Kitsz completed.

=== Erzsébet: The Opera ===
In 1987 Dennis Bathory-Kitsz was planning to write an opera about Elizabeth Bathory, a Hungarian ruler which considered to be the most profiled female serial killer in all of history. Bathory-Kitsz created the "Erzsébet: The Opera" website in 1996, which was featured at Microsoft's old home page; it received millions of hits in one week. People submitted articles, artwork and novels for the website. The first article on Erzsébet: The Opera was published in "Requiem" in France in 1998. In 2001 a team from The Travel Channel found the website and sent Dennis Bathory-Kitsz to Cachtice in Slovakia for a show called "World’s Bloodiest Dungeons". A clip of the makings of the opera behind the scenes was on "Deadly Women" a show aired in 2004 on The Discovery Channel. The entire opera was produced by the composer in 2011.

== Publications ==
=== Books ===
- Country Stores of Vermont Dennis Bathory-Kitsz, The History Press (July 30, 2008) (Second revised edition 2013)
- Kenneth Sawyer Goodman, a chronology & annotated bibliography Dennis Báthory-Kitsz, Newberry Library, 1983
- Learning the 6809 Dennis Bathory Kitsz, Green Mountain Micro; 1st edition (1983)
- The Custom TRS-80, and Other Mysteries Upland, California: IJG, 1982. paper; 340 pp., illus.

=== Scores ===
- Triple quartet: for three groups of two violins, viola and cello Dennis Báthory-Kitsz, Westleaf Edition
- Binky plays marbles: a Bruckner Boulevard dance : for contrabass and viola Dennis Báthory-Kitsz, Frog Peak Music, 1992

== Discography ==
- Wonder and Astonishment, Intent Records, 2015
- Bombasia, Intent Records, 2012
- Bolt, Malted/Media, 2012
- Trade Winds of Vermont, Malted/Media, 2009
- Sinfonietta, Intent Records, 2009
- 60x60 (2004–2005), Vox Novus VN-001, 2007
- 60x60 (2003), Capstone Records CPS-8744, 2004
- UnLimit, Three's Film Works, 2003
- Free Speech for Sale, pressthebutton, 2003)
- The Longman Anthology of British Literature: Music of English Literature, 2002
- Killer Sings!, Malted/Media, 2000
- Zonule Glaes II, Malted/Media, 1999, re-released 2012
- The Frog Peak Collaboration Project, Frog Peak Music, 1998
- Detritus of Mating, Sistrum Records, 1997
- Lucid Nightmares, Malted/Media, 1995
- Invisible Performers, Malted/Media, 1994
- The Nightmare Continues, Malted/Media, 1992
- Alive and Well: Music of Vermont Composers, Ursa Minor, 1990
- Dentist's Nightmare, Malted/Media, 1988

== Interviews, articles, and reviews ==
- American Composer: Dennis Bathory-Kitsz by Kyle Gann, Chamber Music, November/December, 2011
- We Will, We Will Nonpop You by Kyle Gann, Village Voice, September 11, 2001
- Retuning the Dial: Rethinking the Relationship between Radio and New American Music NewMusicBox Published: May 1, 2000
- Sound Bytes of Truth by Kyle Gann, Village Voice July 6, 1999

== Selected list of compositions ==
For a full list of compositions, please see here.

- Construction "on nix rest... in china" (1972), for trombones and tape
- Somnambula (1975), for recorder and electronic sound
- Plasm over ocean (1977), a chamber opera for small ensemble
- Mass (1978), for small ensemble
- Rando's Poetic License (1978), for electronics, microcomputer, voices, instruments
- Echo, A Performance Ritual in Four Parts (1985)
- Mantra Canon (1986), for large ensemble
- In Bocca al Lupo (1986), environmental sound design. Installation: Yellowstone Art Museum, Billings, Montana, 1986
- Beepers (1986), a high-tech cabaret
- Rough Edges (1987), for piano
- Winter, Three Songs on the Nature of Armageddon (1987), for mezzo-soprano and orchestra
- Variations on Amanda (1989), for three strings and harpsichord
- Csárdás (1989), for piano
- Yçuré (1990), for two chamber orchestras
- The Lily and the Thorn (1990), for orchestra
- Traveler's Rest and Wolf5 (1991), sound environments. Installation: Randolph, Vermont, 1991
- A Time Machine (1990), for voice, small ensemble, dance and computers
- Softening Cries (1991), for orchestra
- The Pretty Songs (1991), for saxophone and voice
- Binky Plays Marbles (1992), for double bass and viola
- Emerald Canticles, Below (1993), for small ensemble
- Llama Butter (1993), for tuba and tape
- Build, Make, Do (1994), for small ensemble
- Hypertunes, Baby (1994), for voice and tape
- xirx (1996), a performance work for electronic tape, ice and aromas
- Gardens (1996), for English horn and string quartet
- zéyu, quânh & sweeh (1996), for playback
- Detritus of Mating (1997), electroacoustic work. Installation: Exquisite Corpse Gallery, Burlington, Vermont, 1997
- Into the Morning Rain (1998), for small ensemble
- Zonule Glaes II (1999), electroacoustic work with string quartet
- LowBirds (1999), for small ensemble
- Sourian Slide (1999), for string orchestra
- The Sub-Aether Bande (2000), for flute and percussion
- Quince & Fog Falls (2000), for chamber ensemble
- Mountain Dawn Fanfare (2000), for orchestra
- RatGeyser (2000), for MalletKat and playback
- HighBirds (Prime) (2001), for two electric guitars and playback
- The Key of Locust (2001), for chamber trio
- Fuliginous Quadrant (2001), for chamber ensemble
- Mirrored Birds (2001), a flute concerto
- Tïrkíinistrá: 25 Landscape Preludes (2002), for piano
- Bales, Barrels, & Cones: Antebellum/Antibellum (2002), for drumkit and playback
- Warbler Garden (2003), for electronic playback
- Spammung (2003), for extended voice and playback
- LiquidBirds (2003), for 3 Theremins, video, and playback
- Northsea Balletic Spicebush (2003) for double bass
- Shahmat (2004) for solo flute
- Krikisque (2004), for electronic playback
- Icecut (2004) for orchestra
- By Still Waters (2004) for solo voice and drone
- Rose Quartz Crystal Radio (2005) for sax and percussion
- Jameo y el Delfin Mareado (2005) for orchestra
- Sweet Ovals (2005) for solo horn
- L'Estampie du Chevalier (2005) for string quartet
- Yer Attention, Please (2006) for organ
- Clouds of Endless Summer (2006) for piano trio
- Eventide (2006) for piccolo, small clarinet and contrabassoon
- One hundred "We Are All Mozart" compositions
- I lift my heavy heart (2007) for voice, flute and guitar
- Lunar Cascade in Serial Time (2007) for tenor guitar, in 13 parts
- Mountains of Spices (2007) for mezzo-soprano, violin, viola & piano
- Compound Refractions (2007) for flute
- Turn Around, Bustle and Blaze (2007) for viola, horn, cello & piano
- New Granite (2007) for flute, bass clarinet, violin, cello & piano
- For the Beauty of the Earth (2007) for violin
- Fanfare:Heat (2007) for orchestra
- Morning in Nodar (2007) for double bass
- Scalar Rainbows (2007) for piano
- She Who Saves (2007) for two natural horns and soprano
- O Vox Pop (2007) for bass clarinet and bassoon
- Adeste Hedecasyllabi (2007) for voice and piano
- Framing the Sum of Three (2007) for piano
- Autumn Dig (2008) for intermediate orchestra
- Crosscut (2009) for piano and large wind band
- Erzsébet (2010), chamber opera in 3 acts, and film score
- Giè (2011), small ensemble
- O: Eleven Songs (2011), chorus SATB
- Air (2012), harp and percussion
- Evil Pony (2012), sax quartet
- Chelsea Moods (2012), bass clarinet and band
- Five Hungarian Folk Songs (2013), string orchestra
- The Forest at the South Field (2013), for percussionist
- I think of thee (2013), voice, alto flute, guitar
- Ave Verum Corpus: In Memoriam John Tavener (2013), for chorus
- Aveaux Gadreaux (2014), for cello and bass clarinet
- Thread Count (2014), for string orchestra
- The Lake Isle of Innisfree (2014), for voice, flute and piano
- Wonder and Astonishment (2014), for two MIDI-controlled pipe organs
