= Unrein (surname) =

Unrein is a surname. Some notable persons with the name include:

- Martin Unrein (1901–1972), a general of the German Army during World War II
- Mitch Unrein, (born 1987), an American football player
- Scott Unrein (born 1976), an American composer and is producer/host (since March 2006) of the blog and podcast NonPop
- Sergio Unrein (born 1991), an Argentine footballer
- Terry Unrein (born 1962), American former football player

== See also ==
- Unrein, the fifth studio album by the German band Oomph!
