= Schubel =

Schubel is a surname. Notable people with the surname include:

- Max Schubel (1932–2010), American composer
- Rolf Schübel (born 1942), German film director and screenwriter
