= BMI Film & TV Awards =

American musician award ceremony

The BMI Film & TV Awards are accolades presented annually by Broadcast Music, Inc., honoring songwriters, composers, and music publishers in various genres. Based in the United States, the main pop music award was founded in 1952.

The awards include the BMI Christian Awards, BMI Country Awards, BMI Film and TV Awards, BMI Latin Awards, BMI London Awards, BMI Pop Awards, BMI R&B/Hip-Hop Awards, and the BMI Trailblazers of Gospel Music Honors.

The BMI Student Composer Award—for young composers of classical music—has been won by such composers as Philip Glass (1959), John Adams (1970), Stephen Jaffe (1974), Jonathan Elliott (1985, 1987), and Mason Bates (2003).
