= Tête-à-Tête (Ruth Anderson and Annea Lockwood album) =

Studio album by Ruth Anderson and Annea Lockwood
- Released: April 28, 2023
- Recorded: 1973–1974, 1984, 2021
- Genre: Experimental
- Length: 45:28
- Label: Ergot

Ruth Anderson chronology
Here (2020)	Tête-à-Tête (2023)

Annea Lockwood chronology
Becoming Air / Into the Vanishing Point (2021)	Tête-à-Tête (2023)	Glass World (2023)

Tête-à-Tête is a studio album by American composers Ruth Anderson and Annea Lockwood. It was released by Ergot Records on April 28, 2023. Anderson and Lockwood became a couple shortly upon meeting in 1973 after the former took a sabbatical from her job and needed a replacement. The two would be together for a total of 50 years, wedding in 2005 in Canada following its legalization of same-sex marriage. During their relationship, Anderson composed "Conversations," made as a gift to Lockwood in 1974; and "Resolutions," her last electronic composition, in 1984. Anderson died of lung cancer in November 2019, prompting Lockwood to compose "For Ruth" as an official reply to "Conversations".

Both "Conversations" and "For Ruth" debuted at the 2021 Counterflows Festival in Glasgow. Tête-à-Tête received positive reviews from critics upon its release, with many highlighting its intimate nature and "Conversations" as the album's centerpiece. Several publications featured Tête-à-Tête on their year-end lists. Lockwood played the album in its entirety at the 2024 Rewire Festival.

== Background and production ==
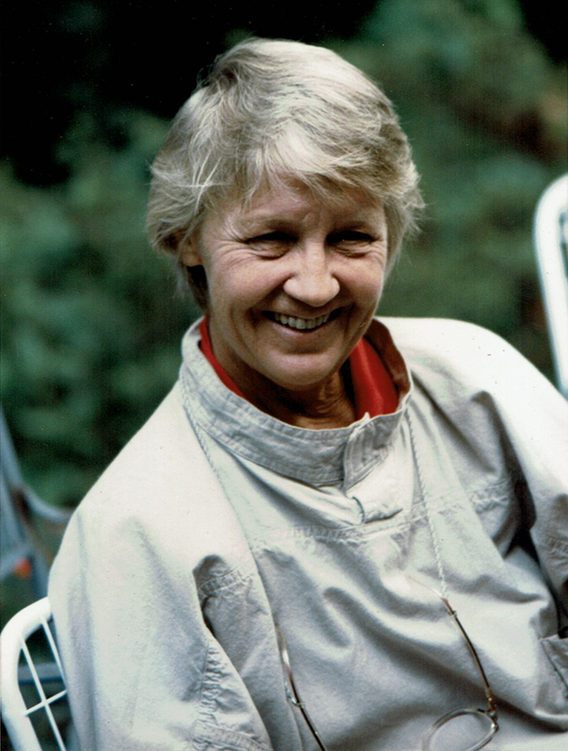
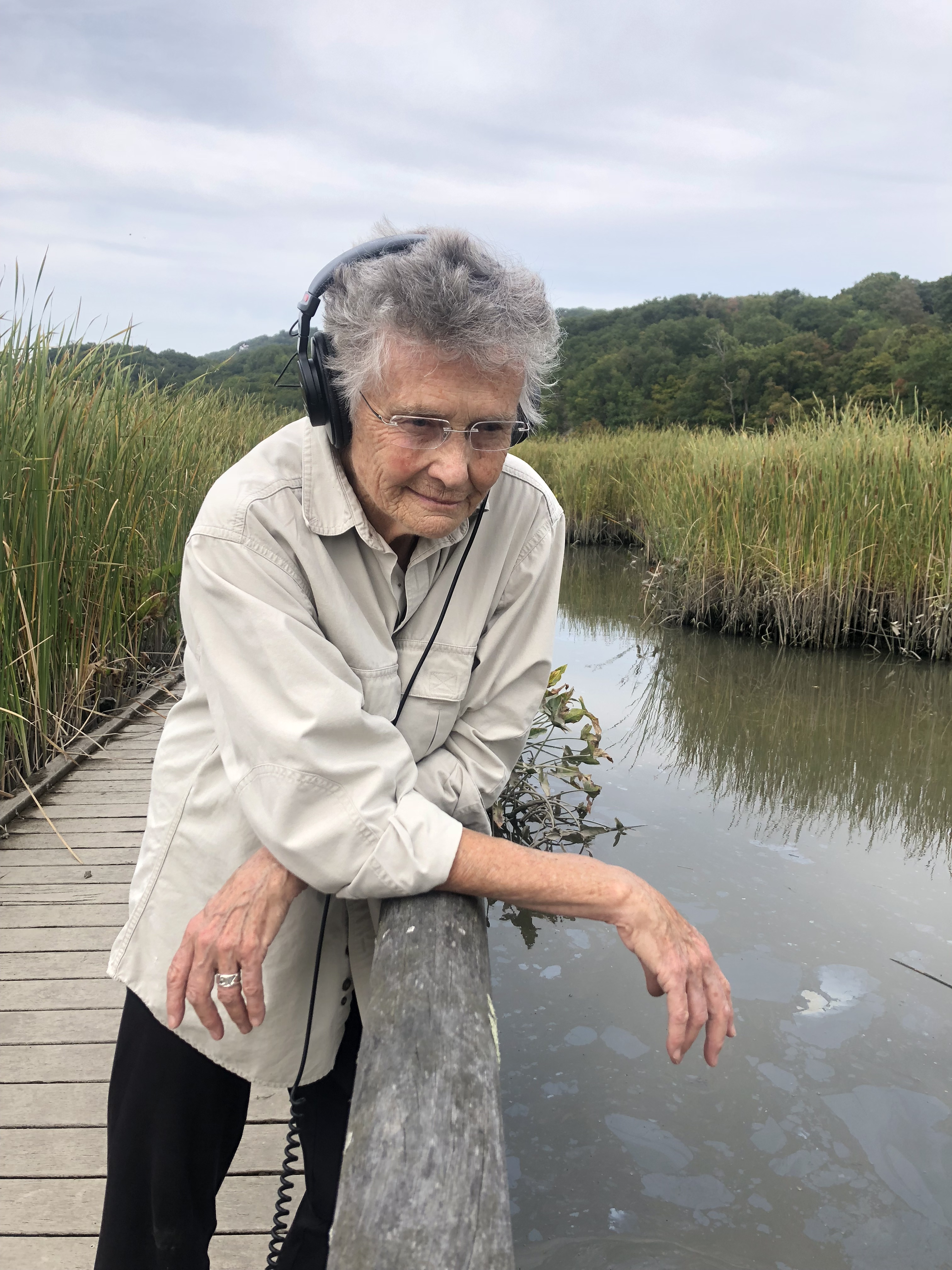
Anderson (left) and Lockwood (right)

In 1973, Ruth Anderson, director of the Electronic Music Studio at Hunter College in New York City, went on a year-long sabbatical to Hancock, New Hampshire. Anderson offered her open position to New Zealand-born Annea Lockwood, following a recommendation by Anderson's friend, composer Pauline Oliveros; Lockwood, then based in London, accepted the offer and moved to the United States. She and Anderson would then meet, and soon after became romantic partners. They married in 2005 in Canada, following the country's legalization of same-sex marriage.

On November 29, 2019, after a 50-year relationship, Anderson died of lung cancer at Calvary Hospital in The Bronx, aged 91. In June 2020, seven months after Anderson's death, Lockwood began creating the composition "For Ruth" by making field recordings in Hancock and Montana. While clearing her shelves, Lockwood discovered "Conversations", a cassette Anderson had made her as a gift. Lockwood then asked mastering engineer and composer Maggie Payne to create a digital transfer of the tape. According to Lockwood, she and Anderson promised each other that they would listen to the tape in their later years, but never did. Both "Conversations" and "For Ruth" debuted at the 2021 Counterflows Festival in Glasgow, where it served as Lockwood's centerpiece for her performance.

== Composition ==
Tête-à-Tête is an experimental album, consisting of two previously-unreleased compositions by Anderson and a newly-recorded piece by Lockwood. The album as a whole represents the relationship between Anderson and Lockwood and was made as a tribute to Anderson; Pat Padua of Spectrum Culture described it as "an intimate document" of the two.

Tête-à-Tête's opening track is the 17-minute drone piece "Resolutions", composed by Anderson. It consists of sine tones that gradually decrease in pitch. Created in 1984, "Resolutions" was the last electronic composition Anderson had completed. The album's second track is the 18-minute "Conversations", a musique concrète composition also by Anderson. While on her sabbatical, Anderson regularly spoke with Lockwood through phone calls. Over a nine month period, Anderson secretly recorded their calls and, in 1974, compiled them into a sound collage as a gift for Lockwood. "Conversations" is interspersed with slow piano interpolations of popular songs, including "Yes Sir, That's My Baby" and "Oh, You Beautiful Doll". The phone calls used in the track primarily consist of non-lexical vocables.

"For Ruth", composed in 2021 by Lockwood, is the closing track on Tête-à-Tête and acts as her homage to Anderson. It consists of various field recordings made at Willard Pond and Sargent Lake near Hancock, and Flathead Lake in Montana. "For Ruth" represents a chronological timeline of Anderson's relationship with Lockwood and its intensity; in Montana, the two had built a home and acts as Anderson's resting place. Sounds used in "For Ruth" include water, birds, and church bells, and the track reuses phone calls recorded for the preceding "Conversations". Towards the end of "For Ruth", Lockwood bids farewell to Anderson through one of their phone conversations – she tells Anderson, "Good night. I love you," to which Anderson replies "Bye-bye, darling." Lockwood considered "Conversations" and "For Ruth" to be the opening and closing pieces, respectively, for her marriage with Anderson.

== Release and reception ==
Professional ratings
Review scores
Source	Rating
Pitchfork	8.0/10
Spectrum Culture	75%

Tête-à-Tête was released by Ergot Records on April 28, 2023. The album received acclaim from critics. Maria Barrios of Bandcamp Daily praised the album as the result of Anderson and Lockwood's "monumental work as composers and educators." She felt that it effectively displayed their relationship and devotion to music. Joshua Minsoo Kim, writing for Pitchfork, noted how the album encourages mindful listening to demonstrate a level of intimacy. Many critics praised the album's tenderness and intimate nature. Padua, writing for Spectrum Culture, applauded Tête-à-Tête for being so intimate to the point that "a listener might feel like they're intruding on something," calling it "part of the fascination." Jennifer Lucy Allan of The Quietus described the album as "gut-wrenchingly personal," and called it "the most moving tribute to a life-changing relationship" she had come across.

"Conversations" was highlighted by several as the album's standout. Robert Ham of Paste praised it for its "blushingly intimate" tune, especially towards the end. Marc Masters, writing for Bandcamp Daily, and Kim described it as euphoric and named it the album's centerpiece. Eric Torres from Pitchfork felt that the album captured "romantic, homespun bliss at its purest." Geeta Dayal of 4Columns described "Conversations" and "For Ruth" as some of the "strangest and most profound pieces of music" she had listened to, but praised the latter for its exceptional immersion. Barrios called "For Ruth" touchingly personal and described Lockwood's field recordings as virtuous. Similarly, Neil Cooper of Scottish Art News felt the song was highly emotional and intimate, labeling it as "a moving call and response." Kim named the album's opener "Resolutions" as mesmerizing.

Tête-à-Tête was placed on several year-end lists for both experimental and all genres. The Wire and The Quietus both ranked Tête-à-Tête as the 12th and 55th best album of 2023, respectively. Stereogum placed the album 8th on their list of best experimental albums of 2023, and Tête-à-Tête appeared on experimental music lists for Bandcamp Daily and Pitchfork. Lockwood played the album at the 2024 Rewire Festival in The Hague, Netherlands; in a column for The Line of Best Fit, Alan Pedder described the performance as being tenderhearted.

Year-end list appearances for Tête-à-Tête
Critic/Publication	List	Rank	Ref.
Bandcamp Daily	The Best Experimental Music of 2023	—N/a	
Pitchfork	The 30 Best Jazz and Experimental Albums of 2023	—N/a	
The Quietus	Quietus Albums of the Year 2023	55	
Stereogum	The 10 Best Experimental Albums of 2023	8	
The Wire	2023 Rewind: Releases of the Year 1–50	12	

== Track listing ==
Tête-à-Tête track listing
No.	Title	Artist	Length
1.	"Resolutions"	Ruth Anderson	17:12
2.	"Conversations"	Ruth Anderson	18:36
3.	"For Ruth"	Annea Lockwood	9:40
Total length:			45:28

== Personnel ==
Credits adapted from Apple Music and the Bandcamp page.

- Ruth Anderson – composer (1–2)
- Annea Lockwood – composer (3)
- Giuseppe Ielasi – mastering
- Maggi Payne – tape transferring
- Kassian Troyer – lacquer cutting
- Bryce Wilner – design
- Annea Lockwood – liner notes
