= OKS =

OKS may refer to:

- OKS Recordings of North America, an experimental music label
- Old King's Scholar, alumni of The King's School, Canterbury
- OKs, a cereal brand formerly produced by Kellogg's

== Organizations ==
- Civic Conservative Party, a political party in Slovakia
- Olympic Committee of Serbia
- Olympic Committee of Slovenia
- Stomil Olsztyn S.A., a Polish football club
- OK Poland Local Government Coalition, a political organization in Poland

== See also ==
- Soyuz 7K-OKS, a version of the Soyuz spacecraft
