= Noah Creshevsky =

American composer (1945–2020)

Noah Creshevsky (January 31, 1945 – December 3, 2020) was a composer and electronic musician born in Rochester, New York. He used the term hyperrealism to describe his work.

== Biography ==
Noah Creshevsky was born Gary Cohen in Rochester, New York, to Joseph and Sylvia Cohen. He changed his surname to Creshevsky in order to honor his maternal grandparents. At the same time he also changed his first name because, he said, "I never felt like a Gary." He studied in the preparatory division of the Eastman School of Music from the age of 6 until 1961, then earned a B.F.A. degree at the State University of New York at Buffalo in 1966, studying with Lukas Foss.

Trained in composition by Nadia Boulanger in Paris and Luciano Berio at the Juilliard School (earning a master's degree in 1968), Creshevsky lived and worked in New York beginning in 1966. There, he founded the New York Improvisation Ensemble. He taught at Brooklyn College of the City University of New York for 31 years, serving as Director of the Brooklyn College Center for Computer Music (BC-CCM) from 1994 to 1999. He also served on the faculties of Juilliard and Hunter College, and was a visiting professor at Princeton University during the 1984 academic year.

Creshevsky began composing electronic music in 1971. His musical vocabulary used bits of words, songs, and instrumental sounds. By fusing opposites—such as music and noise, comprehensible and incomprehensible vocal sources–Creshevsky attempted to make music that sounded both Western and non-Western, ancient and modern, familiar and unfamiliar.

This alliance of opposites is heard both in his text-sound compositions (1973-1986)—Pop Art works in which extreme and unpredictable juxtapositions of iconographic sonic materials establish links between music and society —and in later pieces, in which the integration of electronic and acoustic sources and processes “creates virtual ‘superperformers’ by using the sounds of traditional instruments pushed past the capacities of human performance.” Creshevsky’s most recent compositions are examples of "Hyperrealism", a term he uses to describe an electroacoustic language constructed from sounds found in our shared environment that he handles in ways that are exaggerated or intense.

Collections of Creshevsky's scores and sound recordings are held at the music libraries of Northwestern University. and the New York Public Library for the Performing Arts

Creshevsky, who died of bladder cancer, was interred on Hart Island at his own request. Usually burials on Hart Island are for the homeless or poor and unclaimed bodies. According to his husband David Sachs (a teacher and book editor who lived with Creshevsky for 42 years), Creshevsky intended to protest the trappings and cost of traditional funerals.

== Discography ==
=== CDs ===
Man & Superman (1992) Centaur Records CRC 2126

- Variations (1987)
- Electric String Quartet (1988)
- Memento Mori (1989)
- Electric Partita (1990)
- Talea (1991)

Who (1993) Centaur Records CRC 2476

- Fanfare (1998)
- Sha (1996)
- Twice (1993)
- Who (1995)
- et puis (1998)
- Gone Now (1995)
- Breathless (1997)
- Nude Ascending (1999)

Auxesis Electronic Music by Charles Amirkhanian and Noah Creshevsky (1995) Centaur Records CRC 2194

- Politics as Usual (Amirkhanian)
- Borrowed Time (Creshevsky—1992)
- Private Lives (Creshevsky—1993)
- Coup d'état (Creshevsky—1994)

Hyperrealism (2003) Mutable Music Mutable 17516-2

- Canto di Malavita (2002)
- Jacob’s Ladder (1999)
- Vol-au-vent (2002)
- Hoodlum Priest (2002)
- Novella (2000)
- Ossi di morte (1997)
- Jubilate (2001)
- Born Again (2003)

The Tape Music of Noah Creshevsky, 1971-1992 (2004) EM Records (Japan) EM 1042CD

- Strategic Defense Initiative (1986)
- Highway (1979)
- Circuit (1971)
- Drummer (1985)
- Great Performances (1978)
- Sonata (1980)
- In Other Words (Portrait of John Cage) (1976)
- Cantiga (1992)

To Know and Not to Know (2007) Tzadik Tzadik-8036

- Red Carpet (2007)
- Psalmus XXIII (2003)
- To Know and Not to Know (2005)
- Once (2004)
- Chamber Concerto (1998)
- Jubilate (2001)
- Sequenza (for trombone) (2004)
- Independence Day (1997)
- Free Speech (2006)

Favorite Encores, Music of Noah Creshevsky and If, Bwana, (2008) Pogus Pogus 21049-2

- Mari Kimura Redux (Creshevsky)
- Xyloxings (If, Bwana)
- Shadow of a Doubt (Creshevsky)
- Scraping Scrafide (If, Bwana)
- Intrada (Creshevsky)
- Cicada #4: Version Barnard (If, Bwana)
- Favorite Encores (Creshevsky)

The Twilight of the Gods (2010) Tzadik Tzadik-8069

- Götterdämmerung
- Omaggio
- Three Minute Waltzes
- Brother Tom
- Estancia
- I Wonder Who's Kissing Her Now
- La Belle Dame Sans Merci
- Happy Ending

Rounded With A Sleep (2011) Pogus Pogus 21063-2

- Rounded With A Sleep
- La Sonnambula
- Lisa Barnard Redux
- What If
- Tomomi Adachi Redux II
- The Kindness of Strangers
- In Memoriam

The Four Seasons (2013) Tzadik Tzadik-8097

- i. summer
- ii. interlude 1
- iii. autumn
- iv. interlude 2
- v. winter
- vi. interlude 3
- vii. spring

Hyperrealist Music, 2011-2015 (2015) EM Records (Japan) EM 1140CD

- 1. Pulp Fiction (2014)
- 2. Tomomi Adachi Redux I (2011)
- 3. Quaestio (2014)
- 4. Orchestral Variations (2013)
- 5. Full Fathom Five (2011)
- 6. La Valse (2013)
- 7. You Are Here (2015)

Sleeping Awake (2019) Open Space Open Space CD 37

- Electric String Quartet (1988)
- Passacaglia (2018)
- Sequenza (for trombone) (2004)
- Sleeping Awake (2017)

=== Compilation albums ===
- 60x60 (2004-2005) Vox Novus VN-001
- 60x60 (2003) Capstone Records CPS-8744

=== LPs ===
- Circuit (1971) In Other Words (1976) - Opus One No. 45
- Broadcast (1973) Great Performances (1978) - Opus One No. 47
- Chaconne (1974) Portrait of Rudy Perez (1978) Highway (1979) - Opus One No. 50
- Sonata (1980) - Opus One No. 58
- Celebration (1983) - Opus One No. 101
- Drummer (1985) Strategic Defense Initiative (1986) - Opus One No. 111
- Reanimator (2018) - Orange Milk Records No. 99

=== Dedications ===
- snapshots (for noah creshevsky) (2003) - Marco Oppedisano

== Articles and reviews ==
- "STUFF MUZAK #1: A (VERY) SOFT FOCUS ON HYPERREALIST MUSIC" by Dwight Pavlovic, Decoder Magazine, June 7, 2016
- "A Language We Already Understand: Noah Creshevsky's Hyperrealism" By Dennis Báthory-Kitsz, NewMusicBox, June 13, 2007
- "When drawing from preexisting works, how do you balance legal and moral obligations with the potential to create new art?" by Noah Creshevsky, NewMusicBox November 1, 2004
