= Douglas Geers =

American composer

Douglas Geers is an American composer, and the founder of the Spark Festival.

== Career ==
Geers is an associate professor of music composition and director of the Brooklyn College Center for Computer Music (BC-CCM) at the City University of New York, Brooklyn College (USA). He had been a professor of music at the University of Minnesota (Minneapolis, USA), where he founded the Spark Festival of Electronic Music and Arts and was its Director from 2003-2009. Geers also is a member of the Electric Music Collective and the electroacoustic band, Sønreel.

== Education ==
Geers received a B.A. in English and Music from Xavier University, a M.A. in Music from the University of Cincinnati College-Conservatory of Music and a D.M.A. from Columbia University in 2002. From 2000 to 2001, he completed a one-year research/composition residency at the Norwegian Center for Music in Technology and the Arts in Oslo, Norway. His teachers include Fred Lerdahl, Tristan Murail, Brad Garton, Jonathan Kramer, George Edwards, Allen Sapp (composer), Frederick Bianchi, and Darrell Handel.

== Selected works ==
- Inanna (2009) multimedia theater
- Calling (2008) opera
- Sweep (2008) for PLOrk with violin and percussion
- Laugh Perfumes (2006) violin concerto
- Tremor Transducer (2004) for five instruments and computer
- Memory Dust (2003) for big band and computer
- Gilgamesh (2002) multimedia concerto/theater
- Enkidu (2001) for violin and computer
- Reality House (1998) for chamber septet
- Ripples (1997) electroacoustic music

== Recordings ==
- Love Paint
- Music for Fish
- 60x60 2006
- SEAMUS 20th Anniversary Electroclips
- 60x60 2005
- Defiant (Electric Music Collective)
- Incandescence (Electric Music Collective)
- 60x60
- Sonic Circuits IX
- Music from SEAMUS, volume ten
