= Annea Lockwood =

New Zealand-born American composer (born 1939)

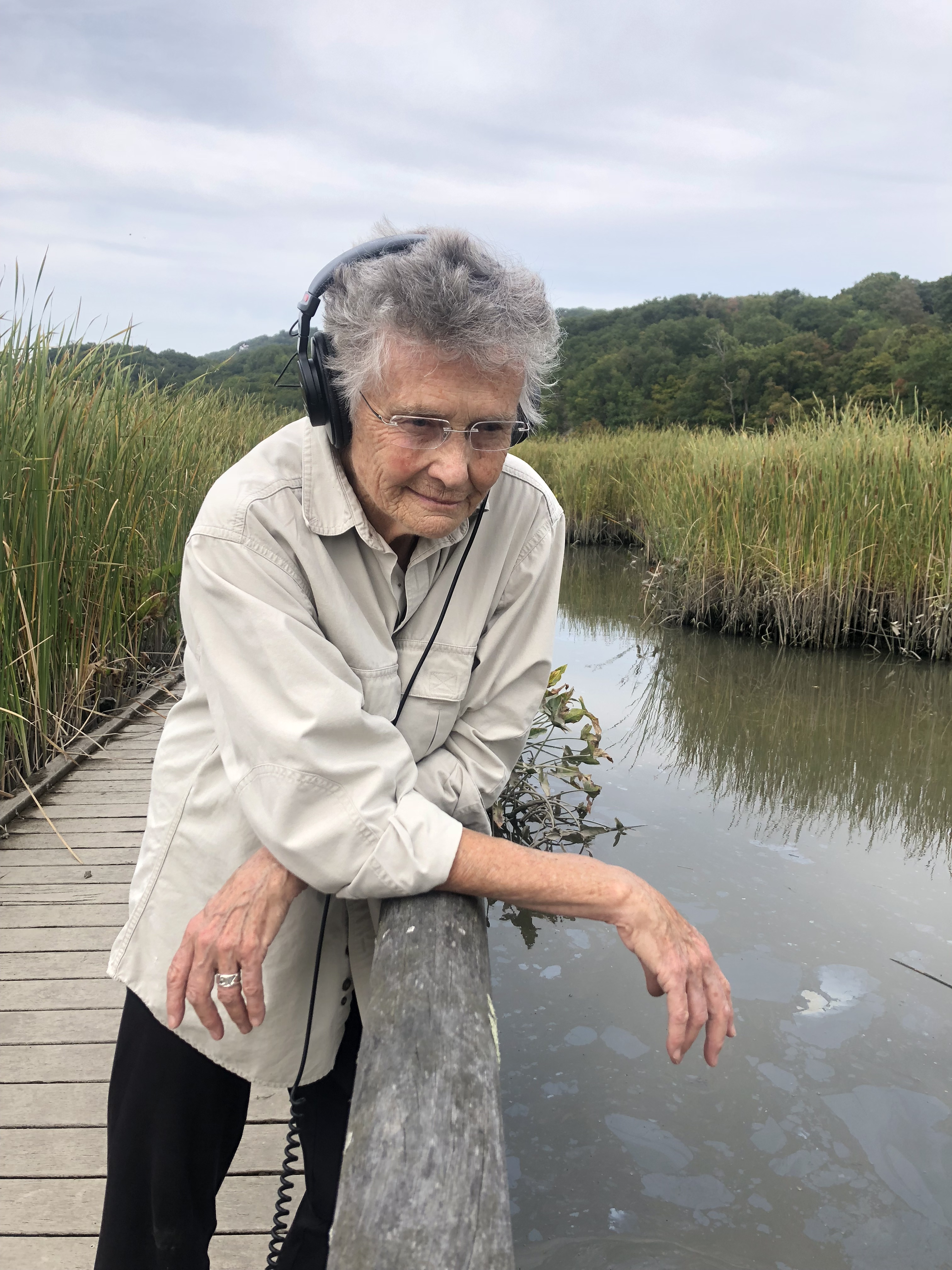
- Annea Lockwood in 2020

Background information
- Born: July 29, 1939 (age 86); Christchurch, New Zealand
- Occupation: Composer

Annea Lockwood (born July 29, 1939) is a New Zealand-born American composer. Her work incorporates microtonal, electroacoustic, and vocal music, as well as field recordings; she has also composed Fluxus-inspired pieces involving intentionally damaging pianos. She taught electronic music at Vassar College in Poughkeepsie, New York, from 1982 until her retirement.

== Early life and education ==
Lockwood studied composition and completed a Bachelor of Music degree with honours from the University of Canterbury in Christchurch. Her composition studies continued with Peter Racine Fricker at the Royal College of Music in London from 1961 to 1963; with Gottfried Michael Koenig at the Darmstädter Ferienkurse from 1963 to 1964; and at the Hochschule für Musik und Tanz Köln. She also studied in the Netherlands. Lockwood settled in London in 1964.

== Career and style ==
During the late 1960s and early 1970s, Lockwood performed and composed around Europe. Her compositions featured non-conventional instruments such as glass tubing used in The Glass Concert (1967). This work was published in the magazine Source: Music of the Avant Garde and later recorded and released by Tangent Records. Her series Piano Transplants utilized burning, drowning, or "planting" pianos in locations across the United Kingdom and United States. In the 1970s, Lockwood began to compose music that could be classified as performance art, as the essence of the compositional ideas made the audience and environment agents in the work. She collaborated with various choreographers, sound poets, and visual artists.

In 1973, Lockwood relocated to New York City after being offered a teaching position at Hunter College. She began working extensively with field recordings, capturing them and building developed compositions around an environmental inspiration, as in A Sound Map of the Hudson River (1982) and World Rhythms (1975). She also built on the archetypes and conversations with significant people, as in Conversations with the Ancestors (1979), composed on conversations with four women in their 80s; and Delta Run (1982) based on a conversation with sculptor Walter Wincha. Three Short Stories and Apotheosis (1985) used what Lockwood named the Soundball, a foam-covered ball made of six small speakers and a radio receiver, to "put sound into the hands of the dancers."

In the 1990s, her pieces were written for acoustic-electric instruments and incorporated multimedia and indigenous instruments. Thousand Year Dreaming (1991) used four didgeridoos and incorporates images of Lascaux into the performance. In 2002, she began working on A Sound Map of the Danube River.

Lockwood's work has been presented at festivals around the world. Her piece Piano Burning has been replicated multiple times, including as the closing track of the 2019 album There Existed an Addiction to Blood by the American experimental hip-hop group Clipping. She has received the Henry Cowell Award (2007) and was featured in the short documentary Annea Lockwood / a Film About Listening (2021) and live documentary 32 Sounds (2022), both directed by Sam Green. Her recordings are currently distributed by Lovely Music, XI, ?What Next?/OO Discs, Rattle Records (NZ), Harmonia Mundi, Earth Ear, New World Records/Composers Recordings, Inc., and Finnadar/Atlantic.

Lockwood is an emeritus professor at Vassar College, where she has worked since 1982. Former students include Jonathan Elliott. She received the SEAMUS Award from the Society for Electro-Acoustic Music in the United States (SEAMUS) in 2020.

== Discography ==
- 1970: The Glass World of Anna Lockwood
- 1977: Tiger Balm Opus One Records 70
- 1977: Women in Electronic Music: New Music for Electronic & Recorded Media
- 1989: A Sound Map of the Hudson River, Lovely Music, Ltd. CD 2081
- 1990: Nautilus on The Aerial: Issue #2
- 1991: Night and Fog on Full Spectrum Voice, Lovely Music, Ltd. CD 3021; features Thomas Buckner, baritone
- 1991: Red Mesa Opus One Records 00152; features Loretta Goldberg, keyboards
- 1993: Thousand Year Dreaming, Nonsequitur/?What Next? WN 0010 & O.O. Discs 0041
- 1994: The Angle of Repose (on Sign of the Times), Lovely Music, Ltd. CD 3022; features Thomas Buckner, baritone
- 1994: Sign Of The Times
- 1996: Ear-Walking Woman
- 1997: The Glass World, Nonsequitur/?What Next? WN 0021 & O.O. Discs
- 1998: World Rhythms (on Sinopah), Experimental Intermedia XI 118; includes Ruth Anderson's I Come Out of Your Sleep
- 1999: Breaking the Surface, Lovely Music, Ltd. CD 2082
- 2003: 60x60, Capstone Records CPS-8744
- 2007: Thousand Year Dreaming/Floating World, Pogus 21045–2
- 2023: Tête-à-Tête (with Ruth Anderson), Ergot Records

== Reviews and articles ==
- 1995, May 23: MUSIC REVIEW; Bang on a Can Uptown Cultivates Crossover by Allan Kozinn, The New York Times
- 1989, December 10: Review/Music; Electronic Components In Work by 3 Composers by John Rockwell, The New York Times
- 1993, April 20: Classical Music in Review by Bernard Holland, The New York Times
- 2000, January 9: It's Sound, It's Art, and Some Call It Music by Kyle Gann, The New York Times
- 2000, July 9: MUSIC; Electronic Music, Always Current by Kyle Gann, The New York Times
- 2001, January 18: Art From a River's Past (and Its Present) by Dinitia Smith, The New York Times
- 2003, March 9: ENVIRONMENT; Inside, An Echo Of a River by James Gorman, The New York Times
- 2004, October 16: MUSIC REVIEW | SOUNDS LIKE NOW, A 'Bring Your Own Improvisation' Party by Allan Kozinn, The New York Times
- 2019, November 8: MUSIC; Burning Pianos and Whispering Rivers: A Composer’s Journey by Kerry O'Brien, The New York Times
- 2023, May 12: Ruth Anderson / Annea Lockwood: Tête-à-tête album review by James Minsoo Kim, Pitchfork
