= An Hour for Piano =

Tom Johnson's An Hour for Piano was written in 1971. The piece began as a series of short, improvisatory sketches in 1967 when Johnson was accompanying a modern dance class at New York University. Johnson gradually expanded these sketches and added transitions between them, writing a piece that is to be played in exactly one hour. Achieving this goal requires an absolutely steady tempo for the duration of the piece, which Johnson has set at quarter note = 59.225 beats per minute. The only recording that is exactly sixty minutes long was released by the Irritable Hedgehog label and performed by R. Andrew Lee.

An Hour for Piano is deceptively simple, with six basic textures that come and go at the composer's whim. There is no order to these textures, and the transitions between them blur significantly the boundaries between them. Kyle Gann writes, "It never deviates from the key of G, though some dissonant motives wash through from time to time. The pedal is held constantly, and 99 percent of the notes are in or just above the treble clef." The effect is one where the past and present become irrelevant and the listener experiences an almost eternal present.

In 1974, Johnson also wrote program notes to accompany the piece. These notes are meant to be read while listening to the work, and they encourage the listener "not to allow the program notes to distract you from concentrating on the music. They are intended to increase your ability to concentrate on the piece, and not to distract from it." These lengthy notes mirror the composition in certain ways, with sentences and entire paragraphs that return frequently and with subtle alterations to the text. The effect is similar to Johnson's landmark article, "What is Minimalism Really About?"

While An Hour for Piano has not enjoyed the same level of recognition that other standard minimalist compositions have, it still "represents many of minimalism's best qualities while avoiding many of its pitfalls. It is an understated watershed of a composition - simple enough to understand on first hearing, complex enough to never fully comprehend, and important enough to usher in a new mode of composition."
