= George Brunner (composer) =

American composer and performer

George Brunner is an American composer and performer born in Philadelphia. He has founded the International Electroacoustic Music Festival at Brooklyn College in 1995 where he has produced renowned composers such as Pauline Oliveros and Noah Creshevsky. He is also the founder of the Brooklyn College Electroacoustic Music Ensemble. Currently, he is the Director of the Music Technology Program for the Conservatory of Music at Brooklyn College and on the faculty of the Brooklyn College Center for Computer Music (BC-CCM).

George Brunner has presented his lecture, "Text Sound: Interlingua, Intermedia, Electronica", at the Spark festival. His works have been performed around the world festivals and concerts including the Spark Festival, the Electronic Music Midwest Festival (EMM), Experimental Intermedia, Compendium International - Bourges (2003), and the 60x60 project in 2003, 2004, 2005, and 2006.

George Brunner is also a sound engineer who has recorded well known composers such as Morton Feldman Joan La Barbara. and Richard Kostelanetz

== Reviews and articles ==
- "Ingenuity and madness?", Malcolm Miller, "Music & Vision Daily", December 24, 2005
- Rockwell, John (May 21, 1990). "Reviews/Music; Bass Works of Good Humor". The New York Times.

== Discography ==
- From Pianalan 60x60 (2004-2005) Vox Novus VN-001
- Within/Without "Chrysopée électronique" Vol.25 : Compendium International 2003 Bourges (LCD 2781131/32)
- Radio Play 60x60 (2003) Capstone Records CPS-8744
