= Dennis Johnson (composer) =

American mathematician and composer (1938–2018)

Dennis Lee Johnson (November 19, 1938 – December 20, 2018) was a mathematician and minimal composer. He is the namesake of the Johnson homomorphism in the study of mapping class groups of surfaces.

Johnson’s early talent for mathematics earned him a full scholarship to the Phillips Exeter Academy, New Hampshire, where he completed high school. He enrolled to study mathematics at the California Institute of Technology in 1956. But after a year he became disillusioned, and although he had studied the piano only casually as a child, he decided to transfer to the University of California, Los Angeles (UCLA), to study music.

Johnson is credited as having composed one of the first truly minimal compositions, November, which was written for solo piano in 1959 and later revised. The creation of November was inspired by Johnson's UCLA college friend La Monte Young's Trio for Strings, written in 1958. November is a pensive piano piece that runs for nearly six hours and predates all other known minimalist works in its use of additive process and diatonic tonality. Part of it was recorded by Johnson in 1962 on audio cassette. November was in return an inspiration for Young's later 1964 The Well-Tuned Piano work. Young gave, from his archive, a cassette copy of November to composer, musicologist and writer Kyle Gann. From it Gann made a new recording of it, as well as producing six pages of the original score. Gann first performed a four-and-a-half-hour version in 2009 with Sarah Cahill and he has produced a new performance score based on the original material that R. Andrew Lee recorded in a five hour version released in 2013 by Irritable Hedgehog Music, after receiving good reviews. In 2017 the Dutch pianist and composer Jeroen van Veen released November as part of his eight-disc Minimal Piano Collection, Vols. XXI–XXVIII.

Johnson gave up music around 1962 and moved into mathematics (working for a time at California Institute of Technology, the private research university in Pasadena) leaving this one fascinating and influential work that features many of the elements that would later become the basic staples of 1960s and early 1970s Minimalism.

Johnson was born in Los Angeles and died aged 80 on December 20, 2018, in Morgan Hill, California, from complications of dementia.
