= Disklavier =

Brand of reproducing piano

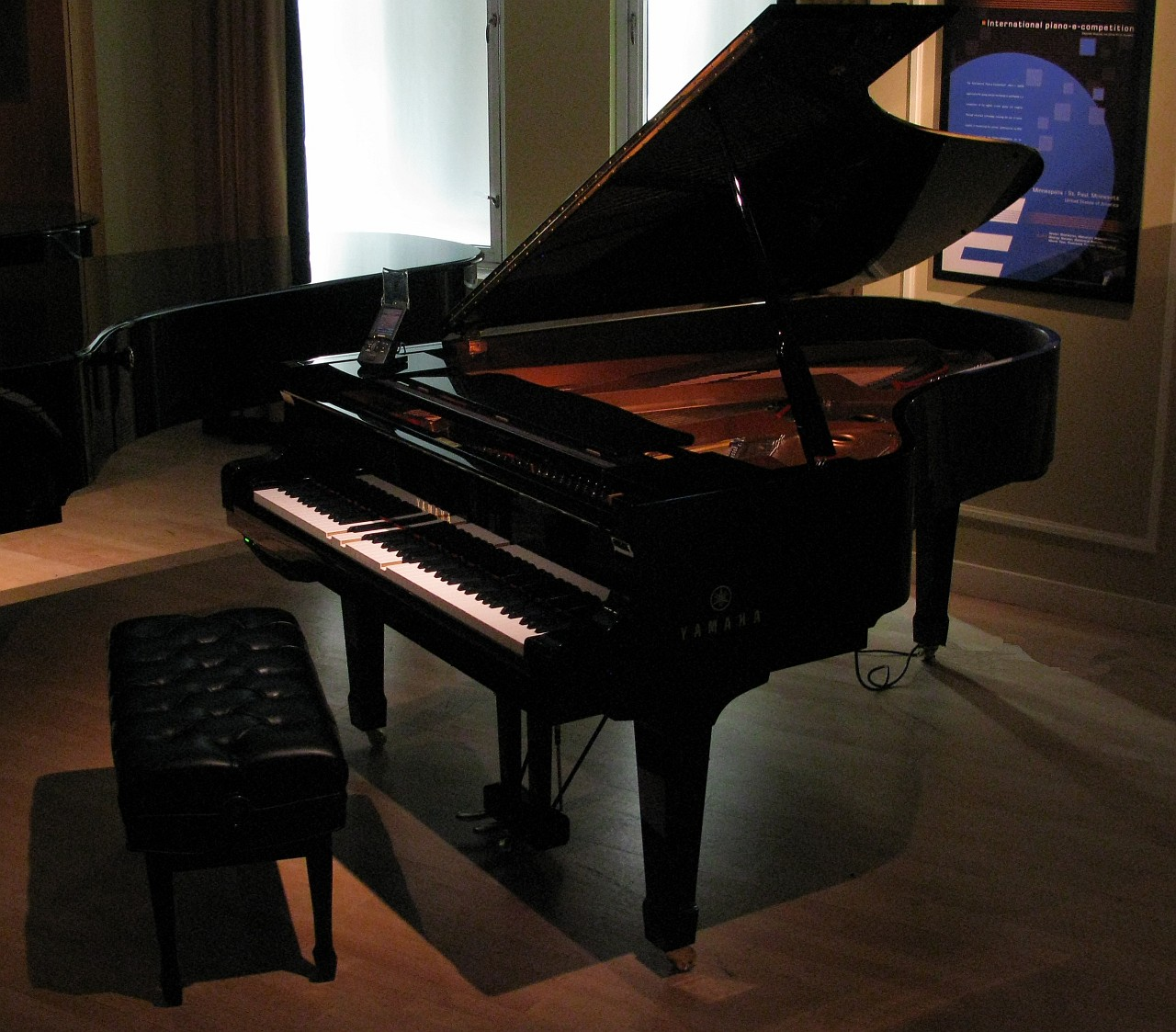
Yamaha Disklavier Pro S6 Grand Piano

Disklavier /ˈdɪskləvɪər/ is a brand of reproducing pianos manufactured by Yamaha Corporation. The first Disklavier was introduced in the United States in 1987.

The typical Disklavier is a real acoustic piano outfitted with electronic sensors for recording and electromechanical solenoids for player piano-style playback. Sensors record the movements of the keys, hammers, and pedals during a performance, and the system saves the performance data as a Standard MIDI File (SMF). On playback, the solenoids move the keys and pedals and thus reproduce the original performance.

Modern Disklaviers typically include an array of electronic features, such as a built-in tone generator for playing back MIDI accompaniment tracks, speakers, MIDI connectivity that supports communication with computing devices and external MIDI instruments, additional ports for audio and SMPTE I/O, and Internet connectivity. Historically, a variety of devices have been used to control or operate the instrument, including buttons on a control box mounted on the piano, infrared handheld controllers, handheld wi-fi controllers, a Java application that runs on a personal computer, and apps that run on iOS-based portable devices. In the 2020s, some Disklavier owners have also adopted third-party mobile applications, such as DiskPiano, to control the instrument via real-time MIDI streaming over Bluetooth MIDI or USB-MIDI connections.

Disklaviers have been manufactured in the form of upright, baby grand, and grand piano styles (including a nine-foot concert grand). Reproducing systems have ranged from relatively simple, playback-only models to the PRO models which record performance data at resolutions that exceed the limits of normal MIDI data. From the late 1990s into the early 2000s, Yamaha also produced a GranTouch series of Disklaviers that were digital pianos with a grand piano action. In addition to recording, the GranTouch instruments were capable of playing back performances with moving keys although the moving keys were not necessary for the electronic reproduction of sound.

== Model history ==
=== Early models ===
Prior to the introduction of the Disklavier in the United States, Yamaha Corporation of Japan debuted an upright reproducing instrument in 1982 called "Piano Player". It featured a record-and-playback system, floppy disk storage of performance data, and the ability to playback multi-track performance files that included instrumental tracks whose sound was reproduced by a tone generator. There was also an upright model sold in Japan in 1985 known as the MX100R.

The first model introduced in the United States was the studio model upright MX100A in 1987 (easiest way to identify this model is the LED Display on the front of the piano is red whilst all later models were changed to green or as in the case of the current E3, a white display). Shortly thereafter, it was slightly modified and renamed MX100B. This early upright was followed by the first grand piano model in 1989. This early grand piano version of the Disklavier lacked an official model designation and has become known as the Wagon Grand by virtue of the fact that the control unit was built into a 30-inch (760 mm) tall cabinet on wheels, this model in Japan does have a model designation of PPG-10R and it has been called DKW10.

A third, early model series was introduced in the early 1990s in small uprights and was known as the MX80 series. Like the MX100A, MX100B, and Wagon Grand, the MX80 recorded on 3.5-inch (89 mm) double-density floppy disks and recorded performances in a Yamaha-proprietary file format called E-SEQ, a forerunner of the subsequent industry-standard file format known as Standard MIDI Files. All of these instruments featured ports for MIDI input and output.

Technical innovations found on these early model instruments included hammer sensors for recording (MX100A, MX100B, and Wagon Grand), recording and playback of incremental pedal data (Wagon Grand), and moving pedals during playback (all models).

=== Mark II, Mark IIXG ===
The next generation of Disklaviers began with the Mark II in 1992. Standard features included hammers sensors for recording, support for recording and playback of incremental pedal data, and support for the emerging industry standard file format called Standard MIDI Files.

Within two years of the introduction of the Mark II, the Mark IIXG system became available which included support for 3.5-inch (89 mm) high density floppy disks, built-in non-volatile memory for song storage, multi-track recording, and an on-board tone generator which supported several sound sets including General MIDI (GM), Roland's General Standard (GS), and Yamaha's XG. Upgrade kits became available to update Mark II pianos to include the Mark IIXG features. This included the DSR1 module which gave wagon grand, MX100A/B and Mark II disklavier owners most of the features of the Mark IIXG however it didn't change the fundamental recording and playback accuracy of the solenoids or sensors of those early systems.

During the Mark II and Mark IIXG era, various models of uprights were introduced that included a silent system. When the silent system was engaged, the hammers were prevented from hitting the strings and the instrument produced no sound acoustically. The player was able to wear a headset and hear themselves play as though they were playing a digital piano with the sound of a nine-foot concert grand. Some Disklavier uprights with this system also contained a Celeste or practice pedal which when engaged brought a rail with a curtain of felt between the hammers and the strings thus significantly reducing the volume of the acoustic piano. This feature could also be used whilst the disklavier system was being used however this feature was a very rare option for pianos with a silent system fitted.

=== Mark III ===
The Mark III system followed in 2000. The Mark III included a variety of underlying technical improvements to the record and playback system. An especially noteworthy improvement was its ability to play back performances at very low volume levels. Additional user features included recording and playback of synchronous audio tracks, playback of specially encoded CD-ROM disks from a built-in CD player, and the SmartKey system that provided a play-along feature in which the user is prompted to press silently wiggling keys. The Mark III also introduced support for video-sync recording and playback based on the generation and reception of MIDI Time Code. Another upgrade known as the DCD1 was available that could provide early Disklavier owners with a CD drive for reading Cd's like the Mk III.

=== Pro ===
In 1999, near the end of the Mark IIXG model series, Yamaha introduced the Disklavier PRO. A key selling feature of this model was the claim of greater recording and playback accuracy than had been possible with previously available models. These instruments recorded not only hammer velocity (as MIDI note-on velocity) but key down velocity and key up velocity (MIDI note-off velocity) as well. The instrument was also capable of recording and reproducing key movements that resulted in no audible sound.

Before the PRO, Disklaviers were limited by design, like all MIDI keyboard instruments, to working within a 0–127 range of values for note-on velocity, note-off velocity, and incremental pedal movement. To break this accuracy limit, Yamaha's Disklavier engineers pioneered a unique use of normally undefined MIDI controllers for the purpose of substantially extending the range of values for note-on/note-off to 0–1023 and for pedal movement to 0–255. In Disklavier lingo, this "extended precision" data was referred to as "XP" data.

The recording and reproduction quality of the PRO have been validated by the International Piano-e-Competition, formerly known as the Minnesota International Piano-e-Competition. In 2002, the Piano-e-Competition used the Disklavier PRO on two continents to enable Yefim Bronfman to participate as a member of the competition jury from Hamamatsu, Japan, 6,000 miles from where the competition was taking place in St. Paul, MN. Following each solo performance, synchronized MIDI and video files were transmitted over the Internet, and Bronfman was able to watch performances on a large screen while the local piano reproduced the playing.

Since that time, the Disklavier PRO has been used by the competition to enable pianists to participate in a screening-round of the competition ("virtual auditions") by submitting a video-synchronized performance recorded on a Disklavier PRO. All rounds of the competition are recorded on the PRO and made available as downloadable files from the competition's website.

The original PRO was the first model Disklavier grand to include the silent system. Ever since the instrument's introduction during the Mark IIXG model era, newer versions of the PRO have been available in subsequent model series and have been known as Mark III PRO, Mark IV PRO, and E3 PRO.

=== Disklavier PRO 2000 ===
In celebration of its 100th year of piano manufacturing, Yamaha debuted a concept piano called the Disklavier PRO 2000. The instrument's unusual physical design featured cherry wood, aluminum chassis material, a clear split lid, and a built-in Windows computer with a touch-screen monitor. Internally, this 7-foot-6-inch (2.29 m) piano with a AAA–c′′′′′ (88 keys) compass was based on the Mark III PRO Disklavier system.

The instrument offered a glimpse into the future of Disklavier and piano manufacturing. This was the first Disklavier to support playback of video-synchronized recordings. There was a performance mode that enabled a player to layer a variety of independently zoned sounds on top of their playing, and the built-in computer offered a program called Home Concert 2000 from TimeWarp Technologies that was capable of displaying music on the screen, tracking the performer, turning the pages automatically, and outputting a coordinated accompaniment.

Only nine of these pianos were built. The suggested retail price was $333,000, which made the instrument the most expensive Disklavier ever produced.

=== Mark IV ===
Introduced in 2004, the Mark IV series of Disklaviers was available in grand pianos only. The Mark IV series overlapped the Mark III model era.

The control system for the Mark IV was built on an embedded Linux operating system, and it offered a wi-fi-based PDA-style controller (PRC100) as well as an optional tablet-style controller. The instrument had an Ethernet port which enabled it to be connected to a local area network. There was also an embedded Java application known as the Virtual PRC which could be accessed and run on Mac and Windows computers that were on the same network as the piano. In January 2011, Yamaha expanded the control features of the instrument by offering a free iOS application that was able to control the instrument over the local network.

Other features of the instrument included an 80-gigabyte hard drive, an unobtrusive console, located under the left side of the keyboard, an expanded array of audio ports, support for USB storage devices, and support for USB MIDI communications. Another enhancement of the Disklavier system was the support for SMPTE time code generation and reception, enabling the recording and playback of video-synchronized performance without additional hardware.

Although firmware updates had been available occasionally for earlier models of Disklavier, the Mark IV's Linux-based system was capable of being updated over the Internet. As of 2014, the Mark IV is using the 4th generation of its operating system.

Along with system updates to the Mark IV, Yamaha expanded the functionality of the instrument via the Internet. In 2006, the 2.0 system update was accompanied by the additional ability to purchase recorded performances using the remote controller of the instrument as well as the opportunity to subscribe to a new cloud-based service called DisklavierRadio. DisklavierRadio (sometimes known as Piano Radio) offers a number of "channels" that can be received as performance data streams that are reproduced by the instrument itself.

In 2013, Yamaha combined the built-in technologies of video-synchronized playback and the streaming capabilities of DisklavierRadio and offered customers an additional service called DisklavierTV. DisklavierTV is powered by Yamaha's RemoteLive technology and enables the reception of broadcasts that include video and audio as well as performance data that drives the playback of the piano itself.

Yamaha has offered a large number of DisklavierTV concerts to its Mark IV and E3 customers, including performances by Elton John and Sarah McLachlan, performances from the Monterey Jazz Festival, Newport Music Festival, and the International Piano-e-Competition. Much of this content is also made available on-demand, allowing customers to receive these concerts whenever they would like.

=== E3 ===
The E3 Disklavier system was introduced in 2009 while the Mark IV system was still in production, and in the United States, both systems were offered at the same time. Although there was some system overlap in several piano models, the E3 system was only available in smaller grand pianos—5 feet 8 inches (1.73 m) and smaller. In 2012, Yamaha ended production of the Mark IV system, and in the U.S., the E3 became available in virtually all Yamaha grand pianos and a studio model upright piano (DU1E3).

During the time that the Mark IV was still in production, the available E3 models had a less sophisticated and less costly record-and-playback system. When the E3 series was expanded to include the larger model Disklaviers, Yamaha added the PRO features to the instruments that are 6 feet 1 inch (1.85 m) and larger. In the US, these larger models are only available with the PRO system, and today, the E3 PRO represents the most advanced Disklavier to date. The control unit for the E3 more closely resembles the control unit of the Mark II, Mark IIXG, and Mark III systems although it is the first Disklavier system that does not include an internal floppy drive. The instrument is controlled by an infrared, handheld remote. Like the Mark IV, the E3 can be connected to a local area network via Ethernet cable and then be controlled by a wireless app running on an iOS device. Like the Mark IV, the E3 enjoys the same cloud-based services such as firmware updates, DisklavierRadio, and DisklavierTV.

In order to bring many older model Disklaviers up to the same or similar feature set as the E3, Yamaha introduced the DKC-850 replacement control unit for Mark IIXG and Mark III Disklaviers in 2010. Outwardly, the control unit looks and functions identically to the E3 control unit and provides access to the same cloud-based services, though it does not upgrade the tone generator and has substantially fewer performance/editing features compared with the original control units. The DKC-850 can also update earlier model Disklaviers by connecting to the old control unit via MIDI cables. In this context, the DKC-850 does not support the reception of streaming performances.

=== Disklavier ENSPIRE ===
In January 2016, Yamaha introduced its seventh-generation Disklavier, the Disklavier ENSPIRE. Replacing the Disklavier E3, the ENSPIRE remains the only fully integrated, factory-installed reproducing piano available that can both natively play and record a piano performance.

== Specialized uses ==
In 2006, Matthew Teeter and Chris Dobrian, researchers at the University of California, Irvine, developed third-party Disklavier software controller running on Windows, Mac and Linux operating systems, which replicated the functionality provided by the PDA/Tablet PC remotes. The software and its source code were made freely available. In November 2007, Kevin Goroway used that example code to create DKVBrowser which is an open source project. This software is also multiplatform, and has provided features that are not available on the proprietary interfaces provided by Yamaha, such as wildcard searching.

The software running on the Disklavier Mark IV and Mark IV PRO onboard Linux control computer continues to undergo development and the manufacturer makes firmware updates available to users.

As with other MIDI instruments, one potential benefit of the readily edited MIDI data output by a Disklavier is in the professional recording domain, where a recorded performance could be edited, allowing the correction of minor errors after a take.

== Artistic uses ==
At the end of the 80's, the researcher and composer Jean-Claude Risset, from the Laboratoire de mécanique et d'acoustique de Marseille, became interested in the Disklavier for his research and compositions. He composed Duet For One Pianist in 1989, a set of pieces for piano, where the notes played by the pianist are processed by an algorithm before being sent back to the Disklavier in real time. With his team, including doctor and pianist Simon Bolzinger, he developed DKompose, a library for interactive composition with DiskKlavier in the Max/MSP environment. The library includes elementary operations used in Risset's pieces such as note symmetry, note delay, and arpeggiation.

In his 2015 album Music For Choking Disklavier, musician and composer Hans Tammen focuses on the Disklavier's own sonic qualities, namely the sounds of the mechanics. To do this, he uses notes with such low dynamics that the piano hammer does not strike the string, leaving only the sounds of the piano's mechanics and motors to be perceived. He voluntarily recorded his album by placing microphones at the level of the hammers, activated by the motors. He says that the title of the album "Choking Disklavier" comes from the fact that the MIDI signal processor could stop for a few seconds due to the overload of incoming data.

Texan composer Kyle Gann composed several pieces for the Disklavier. On the one hand, this allows him to compose rhythms that are unplayable for a pianist, but it also allows him to compose microtonal music on the piano, as in Hyperchromatica, released in 2018, where he uses three Disklaviers tuned to intervals smaller than a semitone. This allows him to compose on 243 piano notes instead of 88, controlling the three pianos via MIDI protocol.

In 2018, pianist Dan Tepfer released Natural Machines, a video album posted on YouTube. Dan Tepfer processes MIDI data in real time as he plays the Disklavier, creating a duet between pianist and machine. In the manner of Jean-Claude Risset, what he plays can for example be repeated as in a mirror game or perform unplayable tremolo. His performances are accompanied by abstract visualization programs, evoking the algorithmic principles used in his performances.

== Educational and professional applications ==
The Disklavier has been used extensively in music education, including colleges, universities, conservatories, community music schools, K-12 institutions, and private studios. Applications include:

- record/playback of student performances which enable a student to listen critically to their own playing
- interactive play-along with pre-recorded, pedagogical accompaniment files
- practice of piano concerto repertoire using score-following software, such as Home Concert Xtreme, developed by TimeWarp Technologies
- use of the instrument as a MIDI input device with compositional software
- algorithmic compositions that involve interactivity between performer and computer using software such as Max/MSP from Cycling '74
- multimedia performance using VJ-style software such as Arkaos Grand VJ from Arkaos
- piano accompaniments for singers and instrumentalists

In recognition of its contributions to the field of piano pedagogy, the Music Teachers National Conference and the Frances Clark Institute awarded the Disklavier the MTNA Frances Clark Keyboard Pedagogy Award in 2006.

In 1997, Yamaha undertook a successful, large-scale experiment that connected MIDI instruments together over the Internet, enabling Ryuichi Sakamoto to transmit a keyboard performance to thousands of locations simultaneously. The next year, Yamaha announced a new technology called MidLive RS that developed this concept further, incorporating MIDI data into the RealSystem G2 video/audio SDK provided by RealNetworks. This technology enabled a Disklavier performance in one part of the world to be accurately reproduced in near real time on a similar instrument elsewhere in the world.

Although those early efforts did not directly result in a commercial product, Yamaha continued to explore real-time transmission of Disklavier performances over the Internet. In 2007, Yamaha introduced "Remote Lesson" at the Winter NAMM show. Since then, educators at schools all over the U.S. have undertaken long distance lessons and master classes using the Remote Lesson technology.

Remote Lesson is a feature that is available exclusively in Mark IV and E3 pianos and is available to select educators and institutions. Similar capability is available in a software program called Internet MIDI that was developed by TimeWarp Technologies. Internet MIDI will connect Disklaviers with other Disklaviers as well as with other MIDI keyboard instruments.

When Disklavier pianos are connected over the Internet, there is some amount of delay that is introduced by virtue of the routing of Internet communications as well as the normal buffering of real-time data. In addition, the instrument itself introduces a mechanical delay of about a quarter of a second between the time that MIDI data is received and the moment when the hammers audibly impact the strings.

Although the delay is generally too great for the purpose of performing a traditional piano duet, the delay is adjustable to match the delay that is experienced during a video conference, using software such as Skype. In that context, the back-and-forth playing that takes place during a typical lesson is not impeded by the delay.
