= David Morneau =

American composer (born 1975)

David Morneau (born May 2, 1975) is an American composer. He is most noted for his work with the 60x365 project. in which Morneau blogged a 60-second composition once a day for an entire year. The 365 miniature compositions include ambient tracks, found sound, instrumental performances, and loops and sample-based pieces. One of the inspirations of 60x365 was Boris Willis's Dance-A-Day project where Willis podcast a single dance every day for a year. Another inspiration (including the title) is 60x60, another miniature project in which Morneau's work was also part of several 60x60 mixes including the Crimson Mix, Order of Magnitude Mix, 2009 International Mix, 2008 International Mix, Evolution Mix (part II) 2007 International Mix, 2007 Midwest Mix, and 2006 Midwest Mix.

David Morneau and Robert Voisey make up the electronic music duo Elevator Machine Room (EMR).

== Discography ==
- Love Songs; Composer Concordance Records, released November 2013
- The Putney Project (Volume I); Irritable Hedgehog, released 2013
- Broken Memory; Immigrant Breast Nest, IBN009, released 6 August 2013
- a/break machinations; Immigrant Breast Nest, IBN009, released November 2009
- Here I'll Play It Again , 60x60 (2006-2007); Vox Novus, VN-002, released 2008
