= Scott Unrein =

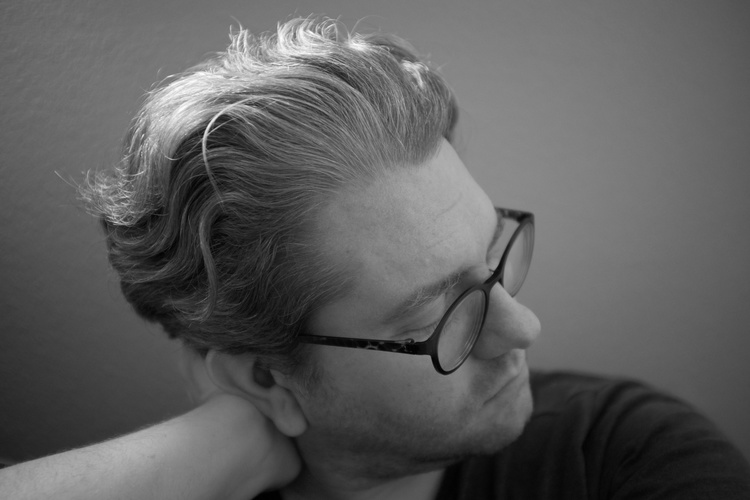
- Scott Unrein in 2018

Background information
- Born: 13 November 1976 (age 49); Portland, Oregon
- Genres: minimalism, postminimalism, Film score, classical, experimental, electronica, ambient
- Occupations: musician, composer, teacher, record producer
- Instruments: french horn, piano, guitar, vocal
- Years active: Early 2000s–present
- Labels: Irritable Hedgehog, redbirdsong workshop
- Website: scottunrein.org

Scott Unrein (born November 13, 1976) is an American composer and performer of electronic and acoustic music.

== History ==
=== Early life and education ===
Unrein was born in Portland, Oregon, United States. He was raised in Salem, Oregon, and attended South Salem High School graduating in 1995.

He attended University of Puget Sound where he studied music and theatre. He then attended University of Oregon graduating with a master's in composition. In 2004, Unrein moved to Kansas City, MO where he attended school at the University of Missouri and pursued a doctorate in composition. While there, he taught music at University of Missouri and Kansas City Kansas Community College.

=== Career ===
His pieces, often for small groups and unusual instrument combinations are slow and quiet, using modular cells of process-driven music. He uses a modified western graphic notation to create ambiguous and complex counterpoint between instruments and instrument groups. Often included under the category of postminimalist and ambient West Coast-based composers, composer and music critic Kyle Gann compared his music favorably to composer Harold Budd.

From 2006 to 2011, he produced and hosted a podcast, NonPop, a radio-like program (74 total episodes) covering new music and new releases of studio albums.

He has released several albums of music and has announced upcoming projects for film and television.

== Discography ==
=== Solo ===
- bird-drawn in the sky of light, (2024) Irritable Hedgehog Music
- A Rising Space, (2018) redbirdsong workshop
- down the sky they sing, (2020) redbirdsong workshop

=== collaborations ===
- The Putney Cascade on The Putney Project, Vol. 1, (2012) Irritable Hedgehog Music
- Nacre on Nat Evans: The Tortoise, (2015) independent release

=== Film work ===
Year	Title	Director	Notes
2023	Half Sisters	Devin Tau	Composer
2020	Sister/Brother	Brian Padian	Composer

=== Television ===
Year	Title	Studio	Episodes	Notes
2019-2023	Microagressions	Northern Flicker Films, Amazon Prime Video	12	Composer
