= OKS Recordings of North America =

OKS Recordings of North America is an experimental music label specializing in small releases of noise, electronic, improvised and musique concrète. The label began in 2006 by co-owners multimedia artist Bill Byrne and filmmaker Jonah Goldstein. The artists on the label include The Painful Leg Injuries, The Harmful Free Radicals, El Plan De Aguavodka, Marco Oppedisano, David Lee Myers (aka Arcane Device), BIOS, Barry Seroff, Alex Spalding, and the Unevenness of the Moon's Surface.

The label's launch officially occurred in January 2006, with three podcasts that featured a new weekly track by the artists El Plan De Aguavodka (John Ibarra), The Painful Leg Injuries (label co-owner, Bill Byrne and his wife, cellist Suzanne) and The Unevenness of the Moon's Surface (label co-owner Jonah Goldstein). The Painful Leg Injuries and El Plan De Aguavodka's Podcasts are still running but The Unevenness of the Moon's Surface ended his podcast at the end of 2006.

In 2007 experimental guitarist and composer Marco Oppedisano, wild-jam band Little Ricky's House of Chankletas, joined the label. Also the BIOS project began in 2007 a collaboration between Marco Oppedisano, John Ibarra and Bill Byrne. Also in 2007, the label aired three episodes of a podcast by Jez Stephens before a mutually amicable end of the series. Little Ricky's House of Chankletas also started a podcast in late 2007, that was canceled in spring 2008 when Barry Seroff left the band. Soon after the Barry Seroff Podcast began. Also in late 2007 the label premiered a podcast by noise musician Alex Spalding. As of May 2010, OKS Recordings of North America officially discontinued the weekly podcast series and as of 2015, is now defunct.
