= Boris Willis =

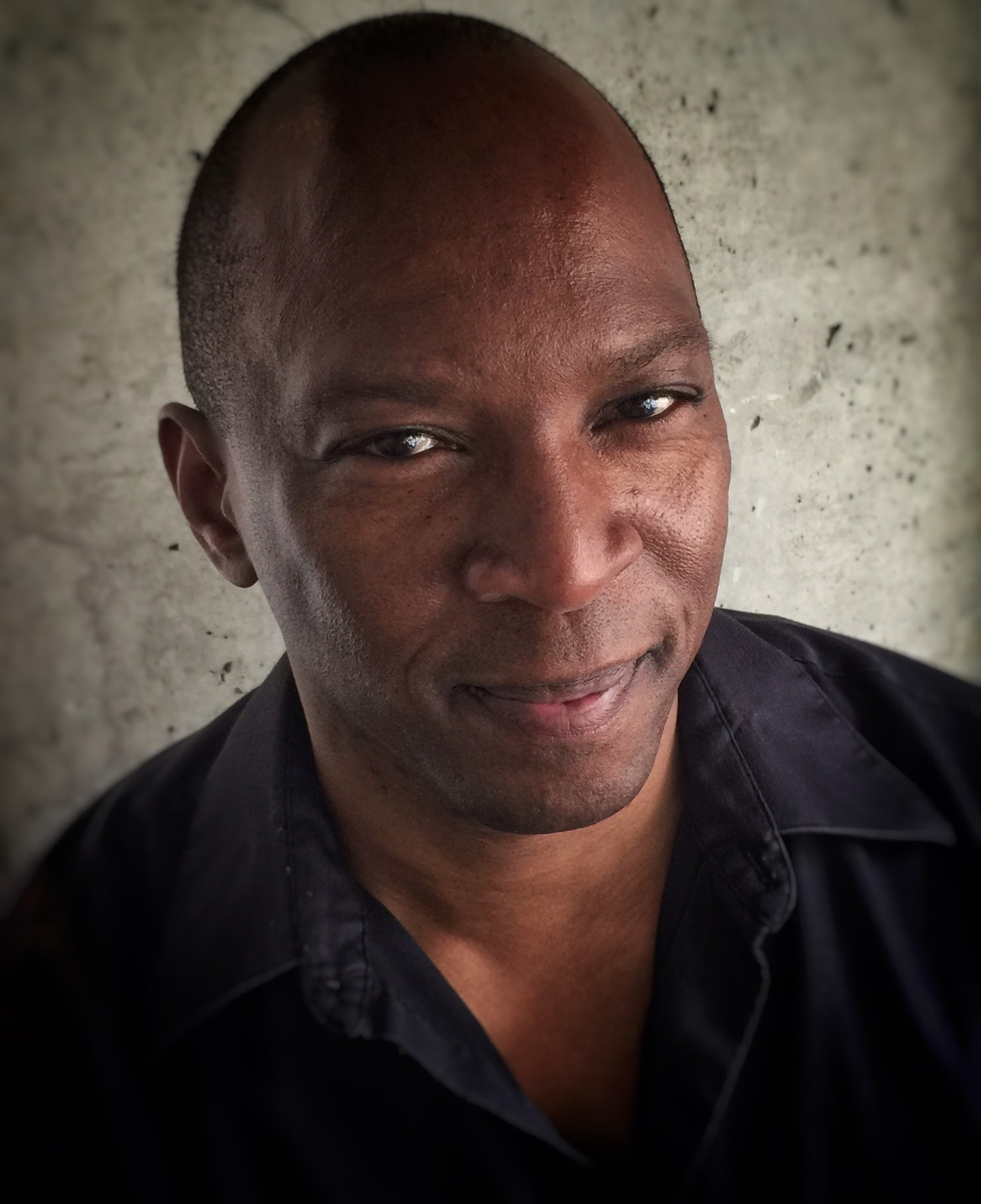
Boris Willis

Boris Willis (born October 9, 1967) is Chief Artistic Officer of Boris Willis Moves and Associate Professor of Computer Game Design at George Mason University. Willis' work has been presented both nationally and internationally. He is the recipient of the 2003 Kennedy Center Local Dance Commission and 2004 Virginia Commission for the Arts Fellowship in Choreography. He founded the dance troupe "Boris Willis Moves" in 2003. Willis is most commonly known for his work, Dance-A-Day, in which he creates a piece every day by dancing in public places and posting video to his Dance-A-Day blog.

Willis has also performed with Liz Lerman/Dance Exchange, Streb, Edgeworks Dance Theater and City Dance Ensemble. His video work has been presented with frequent collaborator Sharon Mansur and Anatomical Scenario/ Anna and the Annadroids.
