= Jonathan Elliott =

American composer and teacher

- Born: 1962 (age 63–64); Philadelphia
- Education: Vassar College and University of Chicago
- Occupations: Composer and teacher

Jonathan Elliott is an American composer and teacher. Born in Philadelphia in 1962, Elliott grew up in Bucks County, Pennsylvania, studying piano from the age of six. He went on to study composition at Vassar College, where his teachers included Annea Lockwood and the pianist Todd Crow; Elliott subsequently received his PhD from the University of Chicago, where he studied with Ralph Shapey and Shulamit Ran. He received Broadcast Music, Inc. Student Composer awards in 1985 (Night Prayer) and 1987 (Epiphany).

Elliott is currently composer in residence at Saint Ann's School, in Brooklyn, New York, where he has taught since 1988. He previously taught at Chicago and Vassar. He has received fellowships from Yaddo (1991,1992,1996), the Ragdale Foundation, the New York State Council on the Arts, and the MacDowell Colony (1989, 1990), and has been in residence at the University of Florida. He has received commissions from Koch International Classics, the American Composers Forum, PS122, the Monadnock Music Festival, the American Liszt Society, Music With A View, and Electric Earth Concerts.

Elliott's compositions have been performed at venues and institutions such as the Aspen Music Festival, Columbia University, Temple University, the Strathmore Center for the Performing Arts, the Chicago Public Library Cultural Center, PS122, the World Saxophone Congress, the Metropolitan Museum of Art, the World Bank Theater, UC Davis, Shanghai Conservatory of Music, the Sydney Conservatorium of Music, the University of Hartford Hartt School, Penn State Hazleton, Symphony Space, University of the Witwatersrand, Montclair State University, Bridgewater State University, Museum of Art, Seoul National University, the Sydney Conservatorium of Music, the University of Illinois at Urbana–Champaign, and the University of St Andrews. His works are recorded on Koch International Classics and Centaur.

== Selected works ==
=== Orchestral ===
- In Silence (1989)
- Tableaux (1991)

=== Chamber ===
- Peacock Fantasia (2018) – flute, viola, piano
- Quartet for Saxophones (2010)
- Then (2009)
- Hommage a B.B. (1997) - soprano, alto flute, viola
- Field Music: Spiral (1997) - flute, viola, harp
- Night Prayer (1985) soprano, flute, clarinet, violin, cello, piano and two percussionists

=== Instrumental duo ===
- Friss/Szellem (2012) – alto saxophone and guitar
- Five (2010) – flute and piano
- Field Music Ash (2005) – alto saxophone and cello
- Friss (2001) – flute and guitar
- Odd Preludes (2000) – alto saxophone and piano
- Epiphany (1986) - alto saxophone and piano

=== Solo ===
- Six Preludes (2004) - piano solo
- Piano Sonata (1988) - piano solo
