= Ruth Anderson (composer) =

American composer (1928–2019)

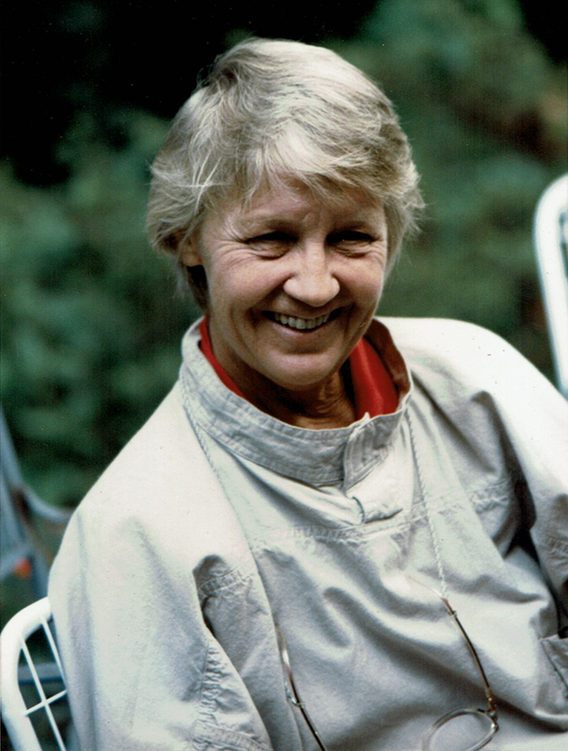
- Portrait of Ruth Anderson by Manny Albam
- Born: Evelyn Ruth Anderson; March 21, 1928; Kalispell, Montana, United States
- Died: November 29, 2019 (aged 91); Bronx, New York
- Occupations: Orchestrator, composer, teacher
- Known for: Electronic music

Evelyn Ruth Anderson (March 21, 1928 – November 29, 2019) was an American composer, orchestrator, teacher, and flutist.

== Biography ==
Evelyn Ruth Anderson was born March 21, 1928, in Kalispell, Montana. She was a composer of orchestral and electronic music. Her extensive education spanned two decades, and was spent at eight different institutions. Throughout this time, Anderson was the recipient of a multitude of awards and grants, including two Fulbright awards (1958–60) to study composition with Darius Milhaud and Nadia Boulanger in Paris. After completing her education, Anderson spent time as a freelance composer, orchestrator, and choral arranger for NBC-TV, and later for Lincoln Center Theater.

=== Post-secondary education ===
- 1949 — Bachelor of Arts, magna cum laude, University of Washington
- 1951 — Master of Arts, University of Washington
- 1958–60 — studied with Darius Milhaud and with Nadia Boulanger at The American School at Fontainebleau
- 1962–63 — Princeton University Graduate School (one of the first four women admitted)
- 1965, 1966, 1969 — Columbia–Princeton Electronic Music Center (today, the Computer Music Center)

She was a "respected electronic composer" whose works have been released on the Opus One label, Charles Amirkhanian's "pioneering" LP anthology New Music for Electronic and Recorded Media (1977), New World/CRI, Arch Records, and Experimental Intermedia (XI). Further work was released on Arc Light in 2020.

== Compositions ==
Anderson composed for a wealth of instruments and ensembles, including orchestra and electronic music. Her sound poem I Come Out of Your Sleep (revised and recorded on Sinopah 1997 XI) is constructed from whispered phonemes extracted from Louise Bogan's poem "Little Lobelia." According to the composer "a very soft dynamic level is an integral component of this piece. It is important to listen to it in the way it was composed, near the threshold of hearing." Her collage piece SUM (State of the Union Message) is included on the Lesbian American Composers collection (1973 Opus One, reissued 1998 CRI: 780). SUM and DUMP (1970), also a sonic collage, are her best known pieces. She called her study of Zen, begun in 1990, "a natural extension of my music," and cited as influential, especially on her interest in music and healing, composers Pauline Oliveros and Annea Lockwood.

Anderson received degrees in flute and composition at the University of Washington and later studied with Darius Milhaud and Nadia Boulanger in the 1950s and with Vladimir Ussachevsky and Pril Smiley in the 1960s at the Columbia-Princeton Electronic Music Center. She wrote that after her exposure to tape manipulation she became open to the potential of, "all sounds...as material for music". She joined the staff at Hunter College (CUNY) in 1966 and created the Electronic Music Studio there, retiring in 1988.

Just before her death in November 2019, Anderson approved the test pressings for an LP of her work, entitled Here and released by Arc Light Editions in February 2020. Included are: "I Come Out of Your Sleep"; "SUM" (which uses TV advertisement samples to mimic a speech by President Richard Nixon); "Pregnant Dream" (a collaboration with poet May Swenson); "Points" (constructed entirely from sine-waves); and the electro-acoustic "So What".

Anderson composed dozens of pieces for a variety of groups; below are some selections of her works.

Title	Composition Date	Instrumentation
Impression IV	1950	Soprano, flute, and string quartet
Sonata	1951	Flute and piano
Sonatina	1951	Flute and piano
Motet, Psalm XIII	1952	Mixed choir
Prelude and Allegro	1952	Woodwind quintet
Symphony for Small Orchestra	1952	Orchestra
Three Children's Songs	1952	Soprano and piano
Prelude and Rondo (dance score)	1956	Flute and strings
Song to My Father	1959	Women's voices and piano
Richard Cory	1960	Women's voices and piano
Wheel on the Chimney	1965	Slide film score and orchestra
The Pregnant Dream	1968	Tape
DUMP	1970	Tape
So What	1971	Tape
SUM (State of the Union Message)	1973	Tape
Conversations	1974	Tape
Points	1974	Tape
Sappho	1975	Tape
Tunable Hopscotch	1975	Installation/Game
I Come Out of Your Sleep	1979, revised 1997	Tape
Centering	1979	Interactive biofeedback: four "observers" with galvanic skin resistance oscillators, and dancer
Time and Tempo	1984	Biofeedback installation
