= David Gunn (composer) =

American composer

David Gunn is an American composer most notedly known for founding Kalvos & Damian New Music Bazaar. His performances on the Kalvos and Damian show are indictive to his unorthodox and quirky composition aesthetic which he is known for. Gunn was also selected for the 60x60 project in 2005 and 2006.

== Discography ==
- 60x60 (2004-2005) Vox Novus VN-001
- 60x60 (2003) Capstone Records CPS-8744
- Somewhere East of Topeka Albany Records TROY535
