= Amnon Wolman =

American classical composer

Amnon Wolman (Hebrew: אמנון וולמן; born 1955) an Israeli-American musician. He holds a doctorate degree in music composition. His catalogue of compositions includes works involving computer generated and processed sounds, symphonic works, vocal and chamber pieces for different ensembles, film music, and music for theater and dance. His recently premiered pieces include "Picnic Site" used for a choreography by Trisha Brown and Steve Paxton for the Lyon Biannale; "End Divided Road" for Flute and electronics for Mario Carolli at the TRAIETTORIE Festival in Parma, Italy; "Cruising Prohibited when Lights Flashing" for the Gay Gotham Chorus at the Greenwich House, New York; and "and her mind moves upon silence", for harpsichord and electronic sounds, for Vivienne Spiteri in Toronto, Ontario, Canada.

== Career ==
His scores are published by the Israel Music Institute and the Israel Music Center. Before Joining the faculty at Brooklyn College he taught at Northwestern University, Tel Aviv University, Stanford University and the University of California, Berkeley. At Brooklyn College he was a member of the composition faculty and Director of the Brooklyn College Center for Computer Music (BC-CCM).

Wolman's film music was featured at the London, Sydney, Los Angeles (1981, 2001), the San Francisco Film Festivals ('93) Berlin Film Festival ('81), Pop Sustainability Film Festival, Seattle Underground Film Festival], Chicago Underground Film Festival (gold medal), CineVegas, Columbus International Film Festival (2000) (bronze medal) and at the Chicago Film Festival ('82, '92).

== Awards ==
His list of awards includes the Queens' 2000 International Competition at the Queen's College, Oxford and an Honorary Mention at the Musica Nova Competition in Prague, Czech Republic. He was also a finalist at the first Ars Electronica, Linz, finalist at the Karl Sczuka Prize, and awarded the First Prize at the NewComp International Competition '88. He received grants from the Eastman Foundation, Arts International, the Dutch Government, America-Israel Culture Foundation, the Rockefeller Foundation, the Djerassi Foundation, Meet the Composer, and the MacDowell and Yaddo Foundations. He was commissioned for Heinz Holliger, Charles Neidich, Ursula Oppens, Harry Sparnaay, Benny Sluchin, Ensemble Modern, and the Israel Chamber Orchestra among others.
