= Tom Johnson (composer) =

American composer (1939–2024)

- Johnson, c. 2000
- Born: November 18, 1939; Greeley, Colorado, US
- Died: December 31, 2024 (aged 85); Paris, France
- Education: Yale University
- Occupations: Composer; Music critic
- Employer: The Village Voice (1971–1983)
- Spouses: Kathy Duncan (divorced); Esther Ferrer (m. 1986)

Thomas Floyd Johnson (November 18, 1939 – December 31, 2024) was an American composer and music critic associated with minimalism. After a religious upbringing in Colorado, he studied at Yale with Allen Forte and in New York City with Morton Feldman. There he covered the work of several noted composers, bringing them to wider attention in The Village Voice.

He found inspiration in the ideas of ancient and early modern mathematicians and philosophers, and collaborated with contemporary mathematicians, while incorporating theatrical and visual elements in his work. Johnson often sought to engage audiences by explaining or narrating the processes of his music in or as part of the musical experience. He relocated to Paris in 1983, where he remarried in 1986 and lived until his death. His works include An Hour for Piano, The Four-Note Opera, Riemannoper, and the Bonhoeffer Oratorio.

== Background and education ==
Tom Johnson was born in Greeley, Colorado, on November 18, 1939, where he received a religious education at a Methodist church, which influenced his work. He earned two degrees from Yale, a B.A. (1961) and the M.Mus. (1967), His theory professor was Allen Forte who introduced him to American contemporary music. He also studied privately with Morton Feldman in New York City. He was influenced also by John Cage, whom he met there through Feldman.

== Career ==
From 1971 to 1983, Johnson was a music critic for The Village Voice, writing about several noted Downtown new music composers, including La Monte Young, Steve Reich, Terry Riley, Philip Glass, Alvin Lucier and Laurie Anderson; thus bringing them to wider attention. An anthology of these articles was published in 1989 by Het Apollohuis under the title The Voice of New Music. Johnson was the first to apply the term 'minimal' to music in his September 7, 1972 Village Voice article "La Monte Young, Steve Reich, Terry Riley, Philip Glass", however, the term 'minimal' had been used in minimal art since the mid-1960s. Through his music journalism, he met composers Steve Reich and Philip Glass, among others and his writings were instrumental in the emergence of composers including Gavin Bryars, Brian Eno, Luc Ferrari, Phill Niblock, and Éliane Radigue.

During this period he also composed four of his best known works: An Hour for Piano (1971), The Four-Note Opera (1972), Failing (1975) and Nine Bells (1979). In his humorous opera The Four-Note Opera, he uses only four notes. The singers play themselves, announcing what they and others do. The chorus proclaims "There are three choruses in this opera. This is the first one. The second one will be almost like this one, but somewhat shorter [...]". The visual also plays a role in Nine Bells (1979), a piece written for nine bells suspended in a three by three square, with one bell in the center. The player moves around this square, hitting bells along the way, following paths that are quite varied but always systematic.

Johnson considered himself a minimalist composer. His minimalism is of a formalist type, depending mostly on logical sequences, as in the 21 Rational Melodies (1982), where he explored procedures such as accumulation, counting, and isorhythm.

After 15 years in New York, he moved to Paris in 1983 where he lived with his wife, the artist Esther Ferrer. He composed the Riemannoper (Riemann Opera), deriving a humorous libretto from Hugo Riemann's music dictionary. It was premiered in Bremen, and was staged more than 20 times afterwards.

He developed more complex techniques using mathematical notions. This began with the collection of Music for 88 (1988), where he applied ideas of Eratosthenes, Euler, Mersenne, and Blaise Pascal. Later he collaborated with living mathematicians, particularly Jean-Paul Allouche, Emmanuel Amiot, Jeff Dinitz, and Franck Jedrzejewski. With them he explored the notions of self-similar melodies (Loops for orchestra, 1998), tiling patterns (Tilework, 2003), and block designs (Block Design for Piano, 2005), along with homometric pairs (Intervals, 2013).

Johnson introduced text and visual images to produce a theatrical atmosphere close to performance art. The librettos for his operas, which he almost always wrote himself, describe what takes place in the music in an objective manner, somewhat reminiscent of Pirandello. Words intervene in many of his works, sometimes by a narrator who explains how the music is made, as in Eggs and Baskets (1987) and Narayana's Cows (1989). From 1988 to 1992, Johnson worked on the Bonhoeffer Oratorio for two choruses, soloists and orchestra, using exclusively texts of the German pastor and theologian Dietrich Bonhoeffer, sermons and texts denouncing Nazism. He commented: "I had a mission, a testimony to convey, a message, which my music doesn't generally have".

The association of text and music led Johnson to write numerous radio pieces, most often for René Farabet (France Culture) and for Klaus Schöning (WDR). In Galileo (1999–2005), bells swing like pendulums in tempos determined by the length of their strings, permitting the composer to make music following the laws of the pendulum, as formulated by Galileo Galilei in the 17th century. Johnson also ran a series of broadcasts for the British FM Resonance called Music by my Friends. He founded two publishing companies for the publication of his works: Les Éditions 75 in France and Two-Eighteen Press in the US.

After 2000, the work of Johnson was less concerned with theatricality and turned more toward musical form and mathematics. From about 2004 to 2010 he worked with what he called "rational harmonies" in pieces like 360 Chords for orchestra (2005) and Twelve (2008) for piano. Rhythm plays an important role in pieces such as Vermont Rhythms (2008), Munich Rhythms (2010), and Dutch Rhythms (2018). He also wrote pieces for jugglers (Three Notes for Three Jugglers, 2011; Dropping Balls, 2011), and completed several more ambitious projects (Seven Septets, 2007–2017; Counting to Seven, 2013; Plucking, 2015). His better known works include An Hour for Piano, The Four-Note Opera, Riemannoper, and the Bonhoeffer Oratorio.

== Personal life and death ==
After a marriage to Kathy Duncan ended in divorce, Johnson married Esther Ferrer in 1986. They collaborated on artistic projects.

Johnson died from complications of a stroke and emphysema at his home in Paris on December 31, 2024, aged 85.

== Publications ==
- The Voice of New Music. New York City 1972–1982, a collection of articles originally publishes in the Village Voice, Het Apollohuis, Eindhoven 1989, ISBN 978-90-71638-09-1.
- Self-Similar Melodies. Editions 75, Paris 1996, ISBN 978-2-907200-01-1
- Looking at Numbers, with Franck Jedrzejewski, Birkhäuser, Basel, 2013 ISBN 978-3-0348-0553-7
- Finding Music. Writings/Schriften 1961–2018 (EN/DE), Cologne: Edition MusikTexte, 2019, ISBN 978-3-9813319-5-0
- Other Harmony beyond tonal and atonal. Editions 75, Paris 2014, ISBN 978-2-907200-02-8
