= Brooklyn College Center for Computer Music =

The Brooklyn College Center for Computer Music (BC-CCM) located at Brooklyn College of the City University of New York (CUNY), is a community of artists and researchers that began in the 1970s asone of the first computer music centers at a public university in the United States.

Its mission is to explore the possibilities of technology in relation to the creation of music, sound art, sound design, and multimedia arts through techniques of music composition using digital tools and instruments, theories and implementation of sound processing and sound synthesis, designing and creation of new digital music and multi-media performance instruments, audio production, history and aesthetics of experimental music and sound art, and creative collaboration.

The BC-CCM also sponsors residencies of visiting composers and media creators.

== History ==
The Brooklyn College Center for Computer Music began when composer Robert Starer, then a faculty member at the Conservatory of Music at Brooklyn College, proposed the creation of an electronic music studio in the mid-1970s. Jacob Druckman and Noah Creshevsky were the studio’s first co-directors and the equipment consisted largely of Moog analog synthesizers.

Charles Dodge took over as director in 1978 and was responsible for the studio's designation as the Center for Computer Music within Brooklyn College. Dodge secured an initial donation of equipment from Bell Laboratories, and then proceeded to acquire large grants from the United States Office of Education, the National Endowment for the Arts, the City University of New York Faculty Research and Award Program, and the Rockefeller Foundation, and donations from private individuals to fund BC-CCM work.

Noah Creshevsky assumed the directorship of the BC-CCM after Charles Dodge stepped down in the early 1990s and George Brunner became Technical Director. At this time CCM began to host an International Electro-Acoustic Music Festival and concert series offering performances of music, video, film, and live electronic works by musicians from around the world and hosted residencies for many composers of national and international stature, including John Cage, Lejaren Hiller, Laurie Spiegel, Larry Austin, Robert Dick, Bob Ostertag, Morton Subotnick, Pauline Oliveros, Jon Appleton, Noah Creshevsky, Jean Claude Risset, and Lars Gunnar Bodin.

When Creshevsky retired in 2000, George Brunner took over as Acting Director until Amnon Wolman was named Director in 2003. Douglas Cohen served as Acting Director while Wolman was on an extended leave, and Douglas Geers joined the faculty as Director of the BC-CCM in fall of 2009.
