= Charles Dodge (composer) =

American composer

Charles Malcolm Dodge (born June 5, 1942 in Ames, Iowa) is an American composer best known for his electronic music, specifically his computer music. He is a former student of Darius Milhaud and Gunther Schuller.

== Education and teaching career ==
Dodge earned a Bachelor of Arts from the University of Iowa in 1964, studying composition with Richard Hervig. He studied with Jack Beeson, Chou Wen-chung, Otto Luening, and Vladimir Ussachevsky during a Master of Arts (1966) and Doctor of Arts (1970) from Columbia University. There he was active in the Columbia-Princeton Electronic Music Center. At Princeton University (1969–1970), he studied computer music with Godfrey Winham.

Dodge became a leading innovator in computer music composition, as distinct from the analog electronic composition norm through the 1970s. He taught at Columbia (1970–1977), then founded the Brooklyn College Center for Computer Music in 1977 at Brooklyn College (City University of New York), serving as Professor of Music. He was also Professor of Composition at the CUNY Graduate Center. As BC-CCM Director, he secured its designation as an official Brooklyn College Center in 1978 and elevated it to world-class status in computer music.

In the early 1990s, Dodge left for Dartmouth College, serving 18 years as Visiting Professor until retiring in May 2009. He co-authored the highly praised book Computer Music: Synthesis, Composition, and Performance (ISBN 0-02-864682-7).

In recent years he is best known, with his wife Katharine, as co-owner of the Putney Mountain Winery in Putney, Vermont, which has grown annually since its 1998 founding.

== Music ==
Dodge created many works in the field of computer music. Earth's Magnetic Field (1970) mapped magnetic field data to musical sounds. Speech Songs (1974) analyzed and resynthesized human voices. Any Resemblance is Purely Coincidental (1978) combines live piano performance with a digitally manipulated recording of Enrico Caruso singing Ruggero Leoncavallo's aria "Vesti la giubba". Other works include The Waves, for voice and computer music, and Profile.

== Discography ==
Columbia-Princeton Electronic Music Center 1961–1973, New World Records, 1998.

- "Earth's Magnetic Field" (originally released in a longer version on Nonesuch/Elektra 71250 in 1970)

Computer Music, Nonesuch/Elektra 71245, 1970

- "Changes"

Synthesized Voices, CRI SD 348, 1976.

- "In Celebration"
- "Speech Songs"
- "The Story Of Our Lives"

Electro Acoustic Music 1, Neuma, 1990.

- "Profile"

Any Resemblance is Purely Coincidental, New Albion, 1994.

- "Any Resemblance is Purely Coincidental"
- "Speech Songs"
- "The Waves"
- "Viola Elegy'"

The Composer in the Computer Age III, CDCM Series Volume 18, Centaur, 2006?.

- "In Celebration"

== See also ==
- Joseph H. Bearns Prize
