= Kyle Gann =

American composer and music critic (born 1955)

Background information
- Born: Kyle Eugene Gann; November 21, 1955 (age 70); Dallas, Texas
- Occupations: Music professor, music critic, composer

Kyle Eugene Gann (born November 21, 1955, in Dallas, Texas) is an American composer, professor of music, critic, analyst, and musicologist who has worked primarily in the New York City area. As a music critic for The Village Voice from 1986 to 2005, he has supported progressive music, including such "downtown" movements as postminimalism and totalism.

Gann was born in 1955 and raised in a musical family. He began composing at the age of 13. After graduating in 1973 from Dallas's Skyline High School, he attended Oberlin Conservatory of Music, where he obtained a B.Mus. in 1977, and Northwestern University, where he received his M.Mus. and D.Mus. in 1981 and 1983, respectively. As well as studying composition with Randolph Coleman at Oberlin, he also studied Renaissance counterpoint with Greg Proctor at the University of Texas at Austin. He studied composition primarily with Ben Johnston (1984–86) and Peter Gena (1977–81), and briefly with Morton Feldman (1975). In 1981–82 he worked for the New Music America festival.

Gann has also worked on Dennis Johnson's once lost minimal composition November, which was written for solo piano in 1959 and later revised. The creation of November was inspired by Johnson's UCLA college friend La Monte Young's Trio for Strings, written in 1958. Johnson recorded part of it in 1962 on audio cassette. November was in turn an inspiration for Young's 1964 The Well-Tuned Piano. Young gave, from his archive, a cassette copy of November to Gann, who made a new recording of it and produced six pages of the original score. Gann first performed a four-and-a-half-hour version in 2009 with Sarah Cahill, and has produced a new performance score based on the original material that R. Andrew Lee recorded in a five-hour version released in 2013 by Irritable Hedgehog Music, after receiving good reviews. In 2017, the Dutch pianist and composer Jeroen van Veen released November as part of his eight-disc Minimal Piano Collection, Vols. XXI–XXVIII.

Gann also worked as a journalist at the Chicago Reader, Tribune, Sun-Times, and New York Times. In 1986, he was hired as a music critic at The Village Voice, where he wrote a weekly column until 1997, and then less frequently until 2005. Gann taught part-time at Bucknell University from 1989 to 1997. Since 1997, he has taught music theory, history, and composition at Bard College. In October 2026, Bard College placed Gann on administrative leave after an alumna alleged he sexually assaulted her in 1998.

Gann married Nancy Cook (the managing director of Bard College's Richard B. Fisher Center for the Performing Arts) c. 1982, and is the father of Bernard Gann (b. 1984), a guitarist formerly with the New York "transcendental black metal" band Liturgy.

== As composer ==
Gann's work as a composer can be classified generally into three categories:

- microtonal works in just intonation, involving electronics;
- rhythmically complex works for Disklavier (computer-driven acoustic piano); and
- piano and ensemble music whose rhythmic complexity tends to be milder and within a single tempo framework.

Most of his music has expressed the concept of repeating loops, ostinati, or isorhythms of different lengths going out of phase with each other; the idea leads to simultaneous layers of different, mutually prime tempo relationships in his Disklavier and electronic works, and is used in a less obvious structural way in his live-ensemble music. This concept can be traced back to suggestions in the rhythmic chapter of Henry Cowell's book New Musical Resources. Gann has also said that he found inspiration in his studies of astrology, into which he was drawn by the writings of composer/astrologer Dane Rudhyar.

Another thread in his work has been the influence, both rhythmic and melodic, of Native American music, particularly that of the Hopi, Zuni, and other Southwest Pueblo tribes. Gann first learned about this music from reading a musical analysis of a Zuni buffalo dance published in the book Sonic Design by Robert Cogan and Pozzi Escot. According to Gann, "It was going back and forth between different tempos: triplet, quarter, dotted quarter, and quarters. So I started collecting American Indian music. [It] solved a rhythmic problem for me, because I was really interested in music with different tempos."

Starting in 1984 with his political piece The Black Hills Belong to the Sioux, Gann adopted a method of switching between different tempos (usually between quarter-notes, dotted eighths, triplet quarters, and other values) as a more performable alternative to the simultaneous layers at contrasting tempos that he had sought earlier under the influence of Charles Ives. Other composers had arrived at a similar technique via other routes, coalescing into a New York style of the 1980s and '90s called Totalism.

A common Gann strategy is to set a rhythmic process in motion and use harmony (mostly triadic or seventh-chord-based, whether microtonal or conventional) to inflect the form and focus the listener's attention. Gann's microtonal music proceeds according to Harry Partch's technique of tonality flux, linking chords through tiny (less than a half-step) increments of voice-leading. In 2000, Gann studied jazz harmony with John Esposito.

== Selected bibliography ==
Gann's books include:

American Music in the 20th Century (1997), ISBN 0-02-864655-X
The Music of Conlon Nancarrow (1995), ISBN 0-521-46534-6
Music Downtown: Writings from the Village Voice (2006), ISBN 0-520-22982-7
No Such Thing As Silence: John Cage's 4'33" (2010), ISBN 0-300-13699-4
Robert Ashley (2012), ISBN 9780252094569
Charles Ives's Concord: Essays after a Sonata (2017), ISBN 9780252040856
The Arithmetic of Listening: Tuning Theory and History for the Impractical Musician (2019), ISBN 9780252084416

== Major musical works ==
- Hyperchromatica (2012; 2015-17; 2020-2021)
- Busted Grooves (2017)
- Space Cat (2017)
- Andromeda Memories (2016-17)
- Futility Row (2015)
- Pavane for a Dead Planet (2016)
- Orbital Resonance (2015)
- Star Dance (2015-16)
- The Planets (Astrological Studies: Sun, Moon, Venus, Mars, Jupiter, Mercury, Saturn, Uranus, Neptune, Pluto) for Relâche: flute, oboe, alto saxophone, bassoon, viola, contrabass, synthesizer, and percussion (tom-toms, cymbals, and vibraphone)(1994–2008)
- Composure for four electric guitars (2008)
- Olana for vibraphone (2007)
- Kierkegaard, Walking for flute, clarinet, violin, cello (2007)
- Sunken City (Concerto for piano and winds, in homage to New Orleans) for solo piano with flute, alto sax, tenor sax, baritone sax, three trumpets, horn, three trombones, and electric bass (2007)
- Fugitive Objects for keyboard sampler (2007)
- On Reading Emerson for piano (2006)
- Implausible Sketches for piano four hands (2006)
- my father moved through dooms of love for chorus, violin, and piano (2005-6)
- The Day Revisited for flute, clarinet, keyboard sampler, synthesizer, and fretless bass (2005)
- Unquiet Night for Disklavier (computer-driven acoustic piano) (2004)
- Scenario for female voice and soundfile/orchestra (2003-4)
- Private Dances for piano (2000/04)
- The Watermelon Cargo, microtonal chamber opera for six singers, three synthesizers, flute, fretless bass, and drummer (2002-3)
- Love Scene for string quartet (2003)
- Petty Larceny for Disklavier (computer-driven acoustic piano) (2003)
- Tango da Chiesa for Disklavier (computer-driven acoustic piano) (2003)
- Cinderella's Bad Magic, microtonal chamber opera for six singers, three synthesizers, flute, and fretless bass (2001-2)
- Transcendental Sonnets for chorus and orchestra (2001-2)
- New World Coming for solo bassoon with flute (or oboe), violin (or viola), and piano (2001)
- Hovenweep for flute, clarinet, violin, viola, cello (2000)
- Time Does Not Exist for piano (2000)
- "Last Chance" Sonata for clarinet and piano (1999)
- Custer and Sitting Bull for speaker, synthesizer, and soundfile (1996–99)
- The Disappearance of All Holy Things from this Once So Promising World for orchestra (1998)
- Snake Dance No. 2 for five percussionists (1994)
- Desert Sonata for piano (1994)
- Chicago Spiral for flute, clarinet, saxophone (or three flutes), violin, viola, cello, synthesizer, and drums (1990–91)
- Cyclic Aphorisms for violin and piano (1987)
- I'itoi Variations for two pianos (1985)
- Baptism for two flutes, synthesizer, and two drums (1983)
- Long Night for three pianos (1980–81)
