= Conservatory of Music at Brooklyn College =

Coordinates: 40.63196°N 73.95272°W

The Conservatory of Music at Brooklyn College (also known as Brooklyn College Conservatory) is the music school of Brooklyn College of the City University of New York (CUNY). It is located on the 26-acre (110,000 m^{2}) Brooklyn College campus in Flatbush, Brooklyn, New York City.

The Conservatory offers undergraduate, graduate, and post-graduate degrees in instrumental and vocal performance, jazz, conducting, composition, music education, music technology, and musicology. Students study with a faculty of distinguished performers, musicologists, theorists, and composers, in addition to a roster of notable guest artists and lecturers.

The conservatory is home to the Brooklyn College Center for Computer Music (BC-CCM) and the H. Wiley Hitchcock Institute for Studies in American Music.

Many members of the faculty also teach at The Juilliard School or the Manhattan School of Music.

== See also ==
- List of concert halls
