= Max Schubel =

American classical composer

Max W. Schubel (April 11, 1932 – February 10, 2010) was an American composer of contemporary classical music. He is best known for being the founder and owner of Opus One records, a company he established in 1966 to record new music by lesser-known and emerging composers of avant-garde and contemporary classical music. He graduated from New York University in 1953.

Schubel maintained homes in Napanoch, Town of Wawarsing, Ulster County, New York (living there from November through April) and Piscataquis County, Maine (living there from May 1 through October).
