= NewMusicBox =

Online music magazine

- Website type: Online magazine
- Available in: English
- Owner: New Music USA
- Creator: Frank J. Oteri
- Editor: Frank J. Oteri
- Website: www.newmusicbox.org
- Commercial: No
- Launched: May 1, 1999; 27 years ago

NewMusicBox is an e-zine launched by the American Music Center on May 1, 1999. The magazine includes interviews and articles concerning American contemporary music, composers, improvisers, and musicians.

A few interviews include renowned American composers: John Luther Adams, Milton Babbitt, Steve Reich, John Eaton, Annea Lockwood, Frederic Rzewski, George Crumb, Meredith Monk, Elliott Carter, La Monte Young, David Del Tredici, Terry Riley, Tod Machover, Alvin Lucier, Pauline Oliveros, and Peter Schickele.

In 1999, NewMusicBox was awarded ASCAP's Deems Taylor Award. This was the first time an Internet site was awarded the prize. Since inception, founding editor Frank J. Oteri and contributing writers, have received several awards for their articles on NewMusicBox. In March 2000, the San Francisco Chronicle's Joshua Kosman hailed NewMusicBox as, "The Web's smartest and snazziest resource for news, features, reviews and interviews on contemporary classical music."

In 2002, NewMusicJukeBox was launched to complement NewMusicBox. This made scores and sound files available via the Internet creating a virtual listening room which cross references the music to their database of articles and information on American Contemporary Music. NewMusicJukeBox was subsequently renamed AMC Online Library and incorporated into the American Music Center's redesigned website.

NewMusicBox's 10th anniversary in May 2009 has been noted by Alex Ross, Drew McManus, and others.

The website has not been updated since December 2024.
