= 60x60 =

Collection of acousmatic sound art works

- Genre: Electronic music
- Location: Worldwide
- Years active: 2003-present
- Founders: Robert Voisey
- Website: 60x60 Official Website

60x60 is a collection of 60 electroacoustic or acousmatic works from 60 different composers/artists, each work 60 seconds or less in duration. 60x60 project showcases sixty new works, each sixty seconds or less, by sixty composers in a continuous sixty-minute concert, for a one-hour cross-section of contemporary music. The 60x60 project was conceived and developed by the new music consortium, Vox Novus and its founder, Robert Voisey.

60x60 was designed to showcase the diversity of the contemporary music and has succeeded in presenting thousands of composers in hundreds of performances around the world since 2003. The 60x60 project puts out a call for submissions for recorded media 60 seconds or less in length (also known as signature works.) 60 one-minute works are selected from the submissions. The 60 works are then ordered to create a one-hour music mix. The 60x60 mix is then synchronized with an analog clock where the beginning of each new minute brings the beginning of a new musical work by a different artist. The 60x60 mix is then presented in several venues throughout the world. Later in the performance season, 60x60 collaborates with artists of different disciplines to create multimedia performances with dance, video, and/or fine arts.

== Performance, participants and purpose ==
The performance of 60x60 consists of the 60 works played over loudspeakers in succession without pause for 1 hour. It is played in conjunction with a synchronized analog clock. Works less than 60 seconds are artistically placed within a minute time frame; the rest of the minute is filled with silence until the next minute begins.

60x60's primary focus is to create an artistic representation of the electronic music being created in society today and to present that music to a large audience, "to represent diverse composers from all walks of life" Each 60x60 performance mix contains a wide variety of musical styles and aesthetics. "Founder Robert Voisey said the 60-centric format – inspired by other intermission-free performances in New York – is designed to retain audiences' attention. And through "60x60," he hopes to expose newcomers to electronic music."

More than 2000 composers have been included in the project. A few notable composers in the 60x60 project include: Liana Alexandra, Ernst Bacon, Dennis Bathory-Kitsz, Eve Beglarian, Stephen Betts, Colin Black, James Brody, George Brunner, Warren Burt, Monique Buzzarté, Christian Calon, David Campbell, Robert Carl, Gustav Ciamaga, fr:Paul Clouvel, Noah Creshevsky, Francis Dhomont, Robert Dick, Emma Lou Diemer, Moritz Eggert, Arne Eigenfeldt, Karlheinz Essl, Carlo Forlivesi, David Gamper, J. Ryan Garber, Robert Gluck, Daniel Goode, David Gunn, James Harley, David Evan Jones, Richard Kostelanetz, Gintas K, Joan La Barbara, Le Tuan Hung, Mary Jane Leach, Elainie Lillios, John Link, Guy Livingston, Annea Lockwood, Chris Mann, Al Margolis, Mike McFerron, Diana McIntosh, Christian McLeer, David Morneau, John Oliver, Pauline Oliveros, Marco Oppedisano, Cezary Ostrowski, Frank J. Oteri, Robert W. Parker, Maggi Payne, Sarah Peebles, Anne van Schothorst, Daria Semegen, Alex Shapiro, Judith Shatin, Alice Shields, Juan Maria Solare, Laurie Spiegel, Allen Strange, Robert Scott Thompson, Barry Truax, Eldad Tsabary, Robert Voisey, Jane Wang, Rodney Waschka II, and Hildegard Westerkamp

60x60 is a project in which promotes both established and emerging composers and artists alike. 60x60 is a platform for the contemporary composer to promote his or her career and expose their style and aesthetic to audiences around the world. Some of the emerging composers include: John Akins, Christopher Ariza, Jason Bolte Scott Brickman Mikel Butler, Russel Cannon, Maurilio Cacciatore, Dan Sedgwick, Marji Gere, Nicholas Chase Brad Decker, Kevin Lewis Noah Meites, Mason Leiberman, Michael Pounds, Garry Wickliffe, Greg Yasinitsky Bruce Hamilton Aaron Krister Johnson, Mark Eden, Robert Fleisher, Tova Kardonne Mason Leiberman. Molly Crain, Joey Perkins, Nadia Smith, Maurilio Cacciatore, Greg Hoepfner, Erdem Helvacıoğlu Michael Wittgraf Lynn Job, Melissa Grey, Adam Sovkoplas, Brad Decker, Nivedita ShivRaj, Chris Flores, Aaron Word, Ricardo Arias, Moises Linares., William Price, Alan Shockley Bettie Ross, Yoko Honda, Lucrecia Ugena, Jennifer Merkowitz, Mary H. Simoni, and Stephen Lias.

A complete list of composers who participated in the 60x60 project can be found on the 60x60 website

The 60x60 project is more than just a single performance. It is a venue where a large community of composers and sound artists come together to present their music. Each year after the call for works a Radio Request Extravaganza is held. This is a radio show where any work submitted to the project may be requested for airplay. Afterwards, a selection panels finds 60 works for the 60x60 International mix for that year; when 60 composers of a particular region or style are found an alternate mix is created to represent them. When this happens the project presents the alternate mix as well as the international mix in its concert season. After the project has presented the audio mixes, usually presented with an analog clock, 60x60 collaborates with an artist in a different media. A second performance season is held promoting the multimedia collaboration. In conjunction to the performances of the project a CD is made each year to represent the submissions sent to the project.

60x60 has been presented in various types of venues throughout the world from concert halls to classrooms; from contemporary museums to art galleries; from projections on building walls to installations in storefront windows; from large public atriums to bars and nightclubs. 60x60 uses "guerrilla" production tactics to bring it to the broadest audience possible. Some notable venues include: the World Financial Center Winter Garden Atrium, Stratford Circus, The Sheldon the Essl Museum, Museum of Contemporary Art in Chicago, the Kemper Museum, the Weisman Art Museum, storefront window at chashama, and Galapagos Art Space. 2010 sees the European debut of 60x60 Dance in London at Stratford Circus.

Other performances include: A*Devantgarde festival, Arts NOW Series, Athena Festival, eArts at Mansfield University, Electronic Music Midwest (EMM) festival, International Electroacoustic Music Festival, EuCuE Free Play: Listening chamber, The Fresno New Music Festival, Kentucky New Music Festival, New Music Days festival, Outside the Box New Music Festival, Spark Festival, Oklahoma Panhandle State University Birmingham New Music Festival, Dance Parade, Sedbergh Music Festival, Minifest Transylvania University's Studio 300: Digital Art and Music Festival, International Sound Art Festival Berlin 2010, and eArts 2010: Sound & Vision. Toronto Electroacoustic Symposium (TES), 2009 Conference of the Texas Chapter of The National Association of Composers

60x60 has been presented in all forms of media throughout the world including Television, radio, and Internet.

== Multimedia collaboration ==
"Robert Voisey collected and culled 60 musical arrangements from many more submissions, all to inspire the performers and stimulate the audience." -Minute to Win It, Alison Sieloff

Embracing its vision to reach a diverse audience 60x60 has collaborated with artists outside the acoustic medium to create multimedia performances. 60x60 has collaborated with experimental film makers, photographers, improvisational videographers, sculptors, choreographers and dancers. Some of the artists the project has worked with include Viv Moore, Hettie Barnhill, Stephanie Bernard, Andy Haspenpflug, Justine Linnehan, Sabrina Pena Young, Adriana Pegorer, Erin Bomboy, Amiti Perry, Patrick Liddell, Zlatko Ćosić, Jeramy Zimmerman, Gisela Gamper, Shimpei Takeda, and Nick Zedd.

=== 60x60 Dance ===
60x60 Dance is a collaboration pairing the 60 audio works with 60 different dances. Exactly like the audio performances, the 60 dances are performed continuously back to back for an hour synchronized with an analog clock. While the music of 60x60 Dance can be from any of the 60x60 mixes, the dancers and choreographers are pooled from the local area where the performance is being held. This creates a "grassroots" touring show which is community based utilizing the dancers from the immediate region. 60x60 Dance has had performances at churches, performance art spaces, art galleries, dance clubs, theaters, The Sheldon, and the World Financial Center Winter Garden Atrium where it was described by The New York Times as a "masterpiece of organization"

- The first 60x60 Dance collaboration started in 2007 with a performance in Jan Hus Church and was directed with the choreographer Jeramy Zimmerman of in collaboration with Robert Voisey.
- In 2009, 60x60 Dance had its debuts in Ohio, Kansas City, St. Louis, and Montreal.
- Choreographer Amiti Perry organized 60x60 Dance to Columbus, Ohio at the Wall Street dance club. This was the first time 60x60 Dance was performed outside of New York City. Some of the artists included Columbus Movement Movement, (cm2 – pronounced "cm squared")
- In Kansas City, Kansas and St. Louis, Missouri, Amiti Perry and Erin Bomboy organized dancers and debuted 60x60 dance in those cities in conjunction with Robert Voisey at Vox Novus. In Kansas City 60x60 Dance was held the Electronic Music Midwest Festival and the St. Louis performance was held at the MadArt Art Gallery in co-production with the New Music Circle. The Dance company MADCO supplied many of the choreographers for that performance.
- In 2010, Erin Bomboy known as one of "the brightest stars in the dance firmament" will return to St Louis for the second year in a row to bring 60x60 Dance to The Sheldon for the American Arts Experience co-produced with HEARDing Cats Collective underwritten by The Fox Performing Arts Charitable Foundation. This performance of 60x60 Dance was recorded by HEC-TV (Public Television in St Louis) and is archived on their website. One of the 60 choreographers included in the St Louis performance was St Louis native Hettie Barnhill a Broadway dancer in the show Fela!.
- 2010 sees the European debut of 60x60 Dance in London on the July 24, 2010. Part of London's Open Weekend and the Create 10 Festival, 60x60 Dance cannot be better placed than at Stratford Circus in Stratford – the heart of the developing London Olympic City, 60x60 Dance is fitting to celebrate the official two year countdown towards London 2012. East London Dance is joining forces with Vox Novus, Artistic Director Robert Voisey, Dance Co-ordinator Adriana Pegorer and Producer Silke Arnold to introduce 60x60 Dance to London audiences. Over 200 choreographers from across the globe submitted to be selected for the London event including Tony Adigum, Colette Brandenburg, Chris Mathews and James Hewison.
- 60x60 Dance also debuted in Toronto in 2010 at the Music Gallery. The 60 dances created by 60 choreographers was organized by Vivien Moore and co-produced by Tova Kardonne and Robert Voisey. The performance was hailed as "miraculous" and "thoroughly enjoyable" by Paula Citron. In a year review of 2010 Paula Citron honored 60x60 with the Genre Fusion Award
- 60x60 Dance returns for its second year in the Dance Festival at Dance Parade. with Dance Coordinators Hettie Barnhill and Justine Linnehan Dance Parade is a yearly citywide dance parade and dance festival in New York city whose mission is to promote dance as an expressive and unifying art form by showcasing all forms of dance. The 2011 performance of the 60x60 Dance will be specifically showcase aerial dance.
- 60x60 Dance returned to The Sheldon in St Louis for the third time to be part of the annual American Arts Experience with Dance Coordinator Hettie Barnhill "It's the perfect mixture of improv and structure with the marriage of movement and music," Barnhill said.
- 60x60 Dance has been performed annually at Slippery Rock University since 2011. Organized by Andy Haspenpflug he comments, "60x60" is more than just a collection of short works played in succession, each work is a different piece, but they are put together by artists to create a macro composition for audiences to enjoy." He also comments in greater explanation, "One of the things I like best about it is it gives people a chance to really express themselves," said Hasenpflug. "They don't have to stick to one genre or a way of doing things that we say. They can essentially do whatever they want although I really try to harp on the fact that it has to be their best quality." Victoria Homschek, a senior dual major in dance and theatre from Aliquippa who performed at 60x60 Dance describes the performance, "I like to tell people to come and ride the wave of the show, ... There are going to be some pieces that are funny, or sad, or you have no idea what's going on, but that's all the fun of it, just seeing all of our creative minds put together."
- In 2014, 60x60 Dance Toronto performs at the Enwave Theater for NextSteps
- For 2015 60x60 Dance created a special Anniversary Mix to celebrate the 15th year of Vox Novus. This mix was presented for a return performance to the Winter Garden at Brookfield Place and premiered in Texas at A&M University. 60x60 Dance also continued a yearly collaborations at Slippery Rock and Concordia University in Montreal.

60x60 Dance embraces the same philosophy for its dance performances as it does with its music productions. It is specifically designed to promote and expose to audiences around the world to many different choreographers and dancers with the vast wealth of vary styles and aesthetics that present day dance has to offer. A few of the choreographers who have participated in 60x60 Dance include: Germaul Barnes, Hettie Barnhill, Rob Bettmann, Mary Cochran, Ginger Cox, Tina Croll, Erin Jennings, Jason Dietz Marchant, Vivien Moore, Adriana Pegorer, Amiti Perry, Sasha Soreff, Jessica Stack, Alicia Walsh, Rachel Wynne, Jeramy Zimmerman as well as dance companies: ExtrACTION Dance Theatre, Columbus Movement Movement, Midwest Dance Theater, First Dance Saint Louis, Kari James Dance Network, Stardance, aTrek Dance Collective, and Ashleyliane Dance.

=== 60x60 Video ===
60x60 Video is an hour of video which is synchronized to the audio mixes of 60x60. 60x60 Video has collaborated with video artists, experimental filmmakers, and VJ's to pair the 60 different audio compositions with video.

- In 2012 Zlatko Cosic, Patrick Liddell, and Sabrina Pena Young returned to collaborate with 60x60 to take 20 minutes each of the 60x60 (2012) presenters mix and create video in a joined effort.
- Zlatko Cosic also curated a film with many film students from the Digital Studio at Washington University in St. Louis using the 60x60 EMM Mix (EMM standing for Electronic Music Midwest)
- Sabrina Pena Young created video to the first Athena mix that she herself was the audio coordinator for and debuted.
- In 2010, PiSSOFFART presented for the Sanguine mix, "DAiLY CUT's" created by Pedro Pinheiro using 60 days of his video captures from casual locations at Barcelona (Spain) and Marraquech (Marocco). The video promoter was Daniel Dominguez Teruel and the screening premiere was at B-Movie Hamburg (Germany).
- Patrick Liddell returns to 60x60 to create video for 7 different 2010 mixes of the 60x60 project: the UnTwelve mix, Burgundy Mix, Crimson Mix, Magenta Mix, Sanguine mix, Scarlet mix, and the Vermillion mix. Liddell's collaboration with 60x60 has been screened at Bellingham's Minifest, and the 2010 Outsound New Music Summit where Jason Victor Serinus Special to The Examiner said, "Expect it to stretch whatever boundaries you may not have thought you had."
- Also Gene Gort (media artist) and Ken Steen (composer/sound artist) New Media New Music New England created What If? 60x60x60 a video an online collaboration that randomly pairs 60 second audio works to 60 second videos. What if? 60x60x60 is a spin-off multimedia project inspired by the 60x60 project.
- In 2009 The 60x60 project collaborated with Patrick Liddel to create the one-hour video.
- The video collaboration between Zlatko Cosic and 60x60 has been performed and screened all over the world and has been described as "an exemplary job of forming a sonic tapestry comprised of extremely diverse material by extremely diverse composers. Sensitive video accompaniment by Zlatko Cosic also helped organize the concert into a more coherent whole." The video performances have taken many forms from traditional screenings at Alternative Film & Video Festival, XMV at Collective: Unconscious, to dynamic VJ performances where video was mixed live at Electronic Music Midwest Festival, Webster University, St. Louis and St. Louis Community College at Forest Park, St. Louis to a large video installation projected on the dance building at the Spark Festival to French TV on Elektra
- In 2005, Shimpei Takeda, a Japanese photographer and experimental videographer collaborated with 60x60
- 60x60 began its video collaborations in 2004 with experimental filmmaker Nick Zedd which was performed in a series at One Arm Red and also had a screening in a New York City dance club called, The Lobby.

=== 60x60 Images ===
60x60 Images is a 60x60 multimedia collaboration based on fine art works that are 60 centimeters in length and 60 centimeters in width and then paired with a 60-second audio work in an art installation or performance. the project first started in Teatro Nuovo Giovanni in Udine, Italy with an idea by Vittorio Vella, and Francesca Agostinelli and Taukay Edizioni Musicali The project has since been reproduced in Mexico and in Cincinnati, Ohio.

== Radio Request Extravaganza ==
In the beginning of each 60x60 concert season, the project holds a Radio Request Extravaganza. This is an all request radio show where composers and their fans call into the hosting radio station request works that have been submitted to the 60x60 project that year. Different new music radio programs and radio stations host the Extravaganza. In the past the 60x60 Radio Request Extravaganza has been hosted on Relevant Tones hosted by Seth Boustead on WFMT in Chicago, Afternoon New Music on WKCR New York, New York; Martian Gardens Radio Show on WMUA Amherst, Massachusetts; Kalvos & Damian New Music Bazaar on WGDR Plainfield, Vermont; Foldover, on WOBC-FM Oberlin, Ohio; and Sculpted Word on WBAR in New York, New York.

For the 10th Annual 60x60, Jim Cross on What's Next? on WGDR hosted a 10-hour marathon of the 60x60 Radio Requset Extravaganza

== Alternate Mixes ==
The project uses grassroots ideology to grow and promote its mission to expose electroacoustic music. When the project receives more than 60 compositions of a particular theme or from a particular region, the project creates a themed mix to be represent that subsection of its submissions. The project has created many different mixes besides its main "International Mix" which is a representative selection of the entire submissions made to the project for that year. Alternate Mixes created by the 60x60 project include: the Athena Mix, the Canada Mix, the UnTwelve Mix, the Presenters Mix, the Pacific Rim Mix, Midwest Minutes Mix, New York Minutes Mix, UK Mix, Munich Mix, Environmental Mix, the Order of Magnitude Mix (a special 10-hour installation mix of 60x60 containing 600 one-minute works, each by a different composer, and was named the Most Composers Programmed In A Single Show by The Universal Record Database), the 60x60 Surround Sound Mix utilizing 5.1 Surround Sound and the 2010 ICMC RED Mixes.

=== 360 degrees of 60x60 ===
360 degrees of 60x60 was a special project of 60x60 created specifically for the International Computer Music Conference at Stony Brook University in 2010. ICMC 2010 was dubbed the "RED" edition as an acronym for research, education, and discovery and the 60x60 mixes were named shades of red to commemorate it. The "RED" Mixes are a special 60x60 project containing 6 different mixes with 360 different one-minute audio pieces by different composers. Each of the 6 different 1 hour 60x60 mixes are named a shade of red titling the mix: including the Burgundy Mix, Crimson Mix, Magenta Mix, Sanguine Mix, Scarlet Mix, and the Vermilion Mix. The 60x60 "RED" mixes have received close to 100 performances in around the world. Patrick Liddell created video for all 6 hours of 360 degrees of 60x60.

=== Athena Mix ===
The Athena mix was created in 2011 and it contains works only from women composers. The mix was named after the Athena Festival and was "macro-composed" by Sabrina Peña Young The first all women 60x60 mix contained the notable composers: Eve Beglarian, Joan Labarbara, Annea Lockwood, Pauline Oliveros, Maggi Payne, Alice Shields, Daria Semegen, and Laurie Spiegel. "The 60×60 Athena Mix accomplishes much in its showcase of talented women from a global perspective. The 60×60 Athena Mix is a creative way to celebrate International Women's Day, a day set aside to celebrate the accomplishments and achievement of women around the world."

In 2012 Sabrina Peña Young coordinated another Athena Mix of all women composers to contribute to the 60x60 projects decade celebration. The concert performed on International Women's Day on Friday 8 March 2013 at Harris Museum & Art Gallery in Lancashire, United Kingdom.

=== Canada Mix ===
The 60x60 Canada mix contains works from composers from and currently living in Canada. The 60x60 Canada mix started in 2008 with Eldad Tsabary as the macro-composer/music coordinator and co-producer. Two Canadian mixes were created in 2008: a concert version which was premiered at Concordia University as part of the ÉuCuE performance series and a "SONUS Gallery" mix that was published in the CEC's (Canadian Electroacoustic Community) electronic journal of electroacoustics, eContact! The 60x60 (2011) Canada Mix was presented at the 5th Toronto Electroacoustic Symposium (TES) a co-presentation of the Canadian Electroacoustic Community (CEC) and New Adventures in Sound Art (NAISA).

=== Environmental Mix ===
The 60x60 (2012) Environmental mix is the first 60x60 mix to include work entirely with the theme of nature and the environment both rural and urban. Composers from over a dozen countries are represented, and pieces including everything from field recordings from unique locations to sounds from outer space, from insect and animal sounds (yes, birds and bees, and also various pets) to urban noises, to expressions of the feelings people have for the places they inhabit, to many aquatic sounds, will be heard. This mix received its premiere in California March 2012 as part of the project's decade celebration. Robert Voisey is the audio coordinator for the 60x60 (2012) Environmental Mix.

=== The UnTwelve Mix ===
The 60x60 Untwelve Mix contains 60 second audio works with tonal systems that go beyond the traditional tonality in Western music and twelve tone music. Started in 2010 in collaboration with UnTwelve, the UnTwelve mix captures the work of composers in the same format as the classic 60x60 concert, however, the emphasis is on pieces whose pitch content is of interest in that it goes beyond the bounds of the traditional 12-tone equal tempered system. Aaron Krister Johnson is the "macro-composer" or music coordinator of the 60x60 UnTwelve Mix and co-produced the mix with Robert Voisey at Vox Novus. was The UnTwelve mix had a proto-premiere in Istanbul, Turkey, on April 14, and the official premiere was April 27, 2010, at the Museum of Contemporary Art in Chicago. It has since had performances in Kansas City, Missouri (July 23, 2010), Charlestown, Massachusetts (June 9, 2010) and is slated to have a performance at Slippery Rock University, Slippery Rock, PA, on October 7, 2010, and a Chicago repeat performance on October 20, 2010, with video art by Patrick Liddell. The 60x60 UnTwelve Mix also has had several performances in Boston at Mobius, "Signs of Our 60 Times 60 II"

=== The 5.1 Surround Sound Mix ===
60x60 in collaboration with Harvestworks, curator Hans Tammen created the first 60x60 mix utilizing 5.1 Surround Sound premiered at the Harvestworks studios in New York City. Receiving 160 submissions the 60x60 Surround Sound Mix exemplifies the variety possible with the 5.1 speaker configuration, "this exhibit is about multichannel sound, we chose a few works that are exemplary in terms of spatialization of sounds, while most others employ these means in a more subtle way. Everything you can do beyond stereo with 5.1 channels is there: 5.1, 5.0, 4.1 and 4.0. There is even a 3.1 work, it does spatialization solely with the center and rear speakers." -Curator Hans Tammen

=== Wave Farm Mix ===
In 2014, Vox Novus and Wave Farm collaborated to put out a call for works to create the Wave Farm mix. This mix was broadcast several times on Wave Farm's WGXC 90.7-FM, available for download, and featured in a series of listening events.

== Macro vs Micro ==
=== Micro ===
60x60 is a collection of miniatures or "signature" works from 60 different composers/sound artists. Each work is 60 seconds (or less) in length and are sequenced in order to fit neatly within each minute of the hour; each new minute is a different piece from a different artist.

60x60 ensures that no individual piece of music lasts too long--you'd be hard pressed to find someone who couldn't sit through one minute of music that didn't appeal to them.

60x60 creates a challenge for the composer/sound artist to express themselves in one minute.

Voisey states, "A minute can be plenty of time to express a whole gamut of imaginative sounds and movements, or it can be a challenge, forcing the artist to isolate what is most important in his/her work."

=== Macro ===
60x60 is much more than a collection of short works played one after another. The entire hour of 60 on-minute works is specifically curated or composed as a one-hour-long "macro-composition" containing the 60 works. All 60x60 mixes are put together by artists to create an artistic hour for audiences to enjoy.

60×60 involves macro-composition, which Voisey describes as, "the act of creating a musical work incorporating several fully formed ideas or complete works." And just as "ballet, operas, and movies are all perfect examples of many artists contributing to a greater artistic whole orchestrated by the 'macro-artist',"

As the creator and leader of 60x60, Robert Voisey has created and "macro-composed" the most mixes and is responsible for the "main" annual 60x60 International mix since 2003. He has put together several other 60x60 mixes including: Pacific Rim mixes, Midwest mixes, 2006 New York Minutes Mix, Munich Mix, Electronic Music Midwest Mix, Evolution Mixes, the UK Mix, the Burgundy Mix, the Magenta Mix, the Sanguine Mix and the Scarlet Mix.

Several other composers have put together different mixes. Eldad Tsabary has been responsible for putting together the Canadian Mixes as well as the Vermillion mix and the Order of Magnitude Mix. Aaron Krister Johnson was responsible for the UnTwelve Mix and the Crimson Mix. Sabina Pena Young was responsible for putting together the Athena mix. Robert Ratcliffe for the Presenters Mix. Melissa Grey for the 2012 New York Minutes Mix. James Finnerty for the 2012 Canadian Mix. Thomas Gerwin for the 2012 Voice Mix.

== Past, present and future ==
There is a history of electroacoustic "shorts." In 1982, Elliott Sharp created an album of shorts called "State of the Union" to accompany an issue of Zone Magazine. In the mid-1980s when the Association pour la création et recherches en électroacoustique de Québec (Acreq) launched an annual competition for "Electroclips", most pieces being between one and three minutes in duration. In the late 1980s, Jean-François Denis and Claude Schryer of Montreal, commissioned 25 three-minute pieces for the "25 instantanés électroacoustiques", Électro Clips, published by empreinted DIGITALes in 1990, IMED 9004. In 1998, Larry Polansky created "The Frog Peak Collaborations Project" a double album of shorts based on an audio sound file from Chris Mann.

In the tradition of projects before it 60x60 has inspired several electroacoustic miniature projects such as David Morneau's 60x365, where he blogged a 60-second composition once every day for a year.

The miniature form continues in many other projects such as Jon Nelson's 50/50 project and Paul Kopetz' 'Towards a Shining Light 50 for 50' project resulting in 3 performances, in Australia, the Netherlands, and the US, in 2023.

== History ==
=== 2016 ===
- 60x60 Dance collaboration with the Departments of Contemporary Dance, Music and Theatre - Faculty of Fine Arts, Concordia University, Montreal, Quebec, Canada. Mix by Eldad Tsabary and Travis West.

=== 2015 ===
- 60x60 Dance at the Winter Garden at Brookfield Place presented by Arts Brookfield and Vox Novus
- 60x60 Dance collaboration with the Departments of Contemporary Dance, Music and Theatre - Faculty of Fine Arts, Concordia University, Montreal, Quebec, Canada. Mix by Eldad Tsabary.

=== 2014 ===
- 60x60 Dance Toronto in Enwave Theater for NextSteps in Toronto Canada
- 60x60 Surround Sound Mix - first 60x60 mix utilizing 5.1 surround sound at Harvestworks in New York City
- 60x60 Dance collaboration with the Departments of Contemporary Dance, Music and Theatre - Faculty of Fine Arts, Concordia University, Montreal, Quebec, Canada. Mix by James Finnerty and Eldad Tsabary.

=== 2013 ===
- 60x60 Dance performance in Toronto, Ontario, Canada
- 60x60 Video Collaboration with Zlatko Cosic, Patrick Liddell, and Sabrina Pena Young on the 2012 Presenters Mix
- 60x60 Dance collaboration with the Departments of Contemporary Dance, Music and Theatre - Faculty of Fine Arts, Concordia University, Montreal, Quebec, Canada. Mix by Eldad Tsabary.

=== 2012 ===
- 60x60 Dance Collaboration with Heather Trommer-Beardslee and Jay Batzner
- Creation of the Composer Concordance Mix
- Creation of the second 60x60 UK Mix
- Creation of the second 60x60 New York Minutes Mix
- Creation of the first 60x60 Voice Mix
- Creation of the first 60x60 Presenters Mix
- Creation of the first 60x60 EMM Mix
- 60x60 Dance collaboration with Andrew Hasenpflug and Slippery Rock University
- Creation of the 5th annual 60x60 Canada Mix
- 60x60 Radio Request Extravaganza on WGDR 91.1 with Jim Cross
- 10th call for works celebrating a decade of contemporary composition
- 60x60 Video Collaboration with Sabrina Pena Young
- 60x60 premiers in Vancouver, British Columbia, Canada; Lawton, Oklahoma;

=== 2011 ===
- 60x60 Dance collaboration with Hettie Barnhill at the Sheldon Concert Hall for the American Arts Experience in St Louis, Missouri presented by Vox Novus and HEARDing Cats Collective sponsored by the Fox Performing Arts Charitable Foundation
- 60x60 Dance collaboration at Slippery Rock, Pennsylvania
- 60x60 Dance collaboration with Justine Linnehan and Hettie Barnhill
- Creation of the 60x60 (Athena Mix)
- 60x60 premiers in Singapore; San Diego, California; Camden, New Jersey; Cincinnati, Ohio; Huddersfield, United Kingdom; Teatro Español, Argentina; Humburg, Germany

=== 2010 ===
- A record setting 60x60 Dance and multimedia performance at the FOFA gallery of Concordia University in Montreal during the Congress 2010 event. The 10-hour-long show set a world record for most composers (600) programmed in a single show
- 60x60 Dance performance at the Sheldon Concert Hall for the American Arts Experience in St Louis, Missouri presented by Vox Novus and HEARDing Cats Collective sponsored by the Fox Performing Arts Charitable Foundation
- 60x60 Dance performance at Stratford Circus, London, England, for its European debut in partnership with East London Dance and Vox Novus
- 60x60 Dance performance in Dance Parade at Tompkins Square, New York City
- 60x60 Dance performance at the Music Gallery in Toronto, Ontario, Canada Awarded the Genre Fusion Award from Paula Citron
- 60x60 Dance collaboration with Andy Hasenpflug and Slippery Rock University
- 60x60 Dance (Order of Magnitude Mix) – Montreal, Quebec Canada
- 60x60 Dance Collaboration with Stephanie Bernard
- 60x60 Dance collaboration with Caterina Bartha and Erin Bomboy
- 60x60 Dance Collaboration with Linda Pehrson and Composer Concordance
- 60x60 Premieres in Miami, Florida; Goodwell, Oklahoma; Green Bay, Wisconsin; Lancaster, United Kingdom; Carrboro, North Carolina; São Paulo, Brazil; Stanford, California; Berlin, Germany; Slippery Rock, Pennsylvania; Fylkingen, Stockholm, Sweden; Buenos Aires, Argentina; Muncie, Indiana; Rio de Janeiro, Brazil; Taipei, Taiwan; Wellington, New Zealand; Hadley, Massachusetts; Lodève, France; Wolverhampton, England; Murray, Kentucky; Sedbergh, United Kingdom; Providence, Rhode Island; Maribor, Slovenia; Latina, Italy; Udine, Italy; Leipzig, Germany, Hartford, Connecticut; San Luis Potosí, México; Essen, Germany; Ibaraki, Japan; Tokyo, Japan

=== 2009 ===
- Debut of 60x60 Dance in St Louis, Missouri at Mad Art Gallery
- Debut of 60x60 Dance in Kansas City, Kansas at the Electronic Music Midwest Festival
- Debut of 60x60 Dance in Columbus, Ohio the first dance show outside of New York City
- Collaboration with videographer Patrick Liddell for 60x60 Video
- Collaboration with choreographer Amiti Perry for 60x60 Dance
- 60x60 premiers in Regina, Canada; Nacogdoches, Texas; Seattle, Washington; Columbus, Ohio; Memphis, Tennessee; San Francisco, California

=== 2008 ===
- Collaboration with choreographer Jeramy Zimmerman for 60x60 Dance.
- Debut of the 60x60 Dance with 60x60 (2008 International Mix) debuts at World Financial Center Winter Garden.
- Debut of the 60x60 Dance with 60x60 (Evolution Mix) debuts at Galapagos Art Space in Brooklyn, New York.
- 60x60 Canada Mix created with Artistic Director Eldad Tsabary
- 60x60 (2007/2008) Pacific Rim Mix debuted in Wellington, New Zealand
- 60x60 Premieres in Belgrade, Serbia; México; Nova Scotia, Canada; Toronto, Ontario, Canada; New Zealand; Pittsburgh, Pennsylvania; Oxford, England; Strasbourg, France
- 60x60 debut at Nuit Blanch (Toronto)
- 60x60 Video collaboration with Zlatko Cosic

=== 2007 ===
- Collaboration with video jockey and filmmaker Zlatko Ćosić Illinois Wesleyan University, Bloomington, Illinois
- Collaboration with video jockey and filmmaker Zlatko Ćosić premiered at the 9th Electronic Music Midwest in Kansas City, Kansas
- Creation of 60x60 Dance with Jeramy Zimmerman a collaboration of 60 dances with 60 audio pieces.
- Munich Mix created – Theme Mix on Oppression and Totalitarianism premiered at the A*Devantgarde festival in Munich, Germany
- 60x60 (2006 / Midwest Mix) performed at Illinois Wesleyan University, Bloomington, Illinois
- 60x60 Radio Request Extravaganza, Afternoon New Music, WKCR New York, New York
- First 60x60 Dance collaboration with Jeramy Zimmerman – New York City
- 60x60 premieres in Wayne, New Jersey; Allendale, Michigan; Denton, Texas; Lexington, Kentucky; Oberlin, Ohio; Bremen, Germany; Munich, Germany; Leeds, England; Galway City, Ireland; Raleigh, North Carolina; Cambridge, Massachusetts; Montreal, Quebec; Orlando, Florida

=== 2006 ===
- UK Mix created – including works from the United Kingdom premiered at the Amadeus Centre in London, England
- New York Minute Mix created – Including works from New York premiered at Collective: Unconscious in New York, New York
- 60x60 Radio Request Extravaganza, Afternoon New Music, WKCR New York, New York
- 60x60 Radio Request Extravaganza, on Foldover, WOBC-FM Oberlin, Ohio
- 60x60 premiere in Gävle, Sweden; Sydney, Australia; Bainbridge Island, Washington

=== 2005 ===
- Midwest Minutes Mix created – including works from the American heartland at 7th EMM (Electronic Music Midwest) festival and Music Bytes at Lewis University
- 60x60 (2005 International Mix) Premiere in London, United Kingdom
- 60x60 Radio Request Extravaganza, on Martian Gardens Radio Show, WMUA Amherst, Massachusetts
- 60x60 Radio Request Extravaganza, on Kalvos & Damian New Music Bazaar, WGDR Plainfield, Vermont
- Multimedia Collaboration with experimental photographer and videographer Shimpei Takeda premiered at Collective: Unconscious in New York City, New York
- 60x60 premiered in Klosterneuburg, Austria; West Hartford, Connecticut; London, United Kingdom; Lille, France; Kansas City, Kansas; Romeo, Illinois; Presque Isle, Maine; and Minneapolis, Minnesota.
- 60x60 (2003) CD Release on Capstone Records
- First 60x60 video screening in Weisman Museum

=== 2004 ===
- Pacific Rim Mix created – including the works from artists living in the Pacific Rim premiered in Los Angeles, California
- Radio Request Extravaganza, on Sculpted Word Radio Show, WBAR New York, New York
- May 13, 2004 – First performance of 60x60 in a dance club – New York City
- Collaboration with underground film maker Nick Zedd premiered at One Arm Red, in Brooklyn, New York
- 60x60 premiered in Los Angeles, California; St. Louis, Missouri; Birmingham, Alabama; Cedar City, Utah; and Istanbul, Turkey.

=== 2003 ===
- Project inception & world premiere of the project in New York City – November 3, 2003

== Listing of performances ==
60x60 Events and Performances

== Discography ==
- 60x60 (2006–2007) Vox Novus VN-002
- 60x60 (2004–2005) Vox Novus VN-001 – Album Nominated for Just Plain Folks Award (2009)
- 60x60 (2003) Capstone Records CPS-8744

== Awards ==
- 60x60 Order of Magnitude Mix was named Most Composers Programmed In A Single Show by The Universal Record Database for containing 600 one-minute works, each by a different composer
- 60x60 Dance - Toronto - Genre Fusion Award - 2010
- 60x60 (2004–2005) CD - Second Place for Experimental Album - Just Plain Folks Awards

== Articles and reviews ==
- 60 Performers, 60 Minutes, 60 Seconds - The Rocket Published by Morgan Miller, Date: September 29, 2021
- Biddeford student participating in Slippery Rock University's 60×60 concert - Journal Tribune Posted September 27, 2018 Updated November 9, 2019
- The Dance Enthusiast Hits the Streets: 60x60 By Erin Bomboy The Dance Enthusiast, November 2, 2015
- Event to showcase 60 one-minute performances By Karuna Kankani The Battalion Life-arts on Monday, October 26, 2015
- A mile a minute with 60×60 Dance Toronto October 10, 2014 / Anupa Mistry / NextSteps
- Almost surreal atmosphere Gefle Dagblad, Gävle - July 8, 2013 09:00
- Open Your Ears to 60×60 by Sabrina Peña Young Easy Ear Training March 6, 2013
- Vox Novus 60x60: Contemporary Composition for the 21st Century by Sabrina Peña Young, New Music Resource, January 12, 2013
- 60x60 at UTC WUTC By Rabbit Zielke Published January 24, 2013 at 10:08 AM EST
- A very different chamber concert by Donald Munroe Fresno Beehive January 28, 2013
- Interview on WBAI 99.5 FM (Talkback with Mark Laiosa) Thursday December 27, 2012 4:00 PM
- CMU students to present 60 dance pieces in concert By MINDY NORTON, The Morning Sun Wednesday, December 5, 2012
- 60×60 The Presenters Mix 2012 Patricia Walsh - TheTwo Hats, December 2, 2012
- Sixty Songs in Sixty Minutes Daily 49er News Radio, November 29, 2012
- Arts Now Series: 60 x 60 By Karen E. Moorman, September 18, 2012, Classical Voice in North Carolina, Raleigh, North Carolina
- Minute to Win It. Alison Sieloff, Riverfront Times – September 2011
- 60x60: netsuke for the musical mind Richard Arnest Sounding Board, Spring 2011
- Year in Review: Dance Teamwork and guts, stumbles and bums By Paula Citron, Globe and Mail Update, December 26, 2010
- 60x60 Dance Toronto Reviewed by Paula Citron, 96.3 FM
- NIU's Electroacoustic School of Music host mixes in 60 seconds Jerene-Elise, Northern Star – November 2, 2010
- Concert to present 'Bits and Pieces of Electro-Acoustic Music from Everywhere,' including NIU NIU Today
- Got a minute? Dance! Calvin Wilson. Post-Dispatch, Friday, October 1, 2010
- 60x60 Dance at The Sheldon in St Louis on HEC-TV – Interviews of cast and producers plus entire show.
- Interview with Hettie Barnhill on KPLR
- LONDON 2012: TWO YEARS TO GO 60x60 Dance Time Out London July 22–28, 2010
- The 60-second dance fest, Lyndsey Winship, Time Out London, July 22–28, 2010
- Sixty seconds to make an impact University of Bedfordshire July 21, 2010
- 60 dances in 60 minutesBig Dance Wednesday July 21, 2010
- 60x60 Dance Big Dance
- 60x60 Dance Maximaliste!, Réjean Beaucage, Musique May 27, 2010 *http://www.columbiachronicle.com/arts_and_culture/article_9057c869-7d55-503d-b313-edb52437977f.html Microtonality in 60 seconds Brianna Wellen, The Columbia Chronicle published May 3, 2010
- '60x60 Dance' Is an Hour-Long Whirlwind of Performances Carl Glassman, The Tribeca Trib published December 8, 2009
- 60x60: A Family Reunion Eileen Elizabeth, iDANZ, published November 24, 2009
- November 6, 2009 – New Music Circle Steve Potter, Cityscape NPR St. Louis Public Radio published November 6, 2009
- SundayArts News Thirteen November 1, 2009
- Minute hand to sweep performers on, offstage Amy Saunders The Columbus Dispatch published Saturday, October 3, 2009
- Performance art for the sound-bite culture Lyndsey Teter, The Other Paper Published: Thursday, October 1, 2009
- Omtumlande internationell timme By Camilla Dal, Gefle Dagblad
- Rob Voisey: 60x60 Dance By Suzanne Thorpe, Electronic Music Foundation, December 21, 2008
- An Express Without Any Delays By ROSLYN SULCAS, The New York Times, November 17, 2008
- Interview with Robert Voisey and Jeramy Zimmerman By Anne Fiero, WKCR, New York, New York, November 13, 2008
- Just a Minute By Susan Yung, Thirteen WNET, SundayArts, November 11, 2008
- Live Stage: 60x60 Dance – New York, Helen Thorington Networked Music Review
- "SFA composers receive honors" Sylvia Bierschenk, Stephen F. Austin State University, News Releases, November 4, 2008
- Arts Now! 60 X 60 2008 by Karen Moorman "Classical Voice in North Carolina", November 2008
- Rob Voisey on 60x60 byEvan, Computer Music Blog, October 18, 2008
- :"60x60: Wellington welcomes New Music's fastest-ticking clock" Tobias Fischer, Tokafi published 2008-09-01
- "Nouveautés en bref" – Réjean Beaucage, Circuit Volume 18 Numéro 1 (2008)
- Podcast Episode Summary Upbeat with Eva Radich Radio New Zealand, Friday, June 13, 2008
- 60x60 Video Collaboration with Zlatko Cosic Elektramusic, le magazine des musiques expérimentales June 12, 2008
- 60x60 2006–2007 Review by Stephen Eddins, All Music
- "Gone in 60 Minutes: Electronic Compositions Showcased at NC State University" – Alexandra Jones, "Classical Voice in North Carolina", October 1, 2007.
- "Time and Motion" – Anne Cammon, "Fly Global Music Culture", May 26, 2007
- "In Concert, 60 Times the Fun" – Sophia Yan, "Oberlin Review", April 27, 2007.
- "60x60 Project presents 60 composers in 60 minutes"- Rachel Slade, "North Texas Daily" February 28, 2007
- "Sound Sampler" – Greg Haymes, "Times Union", February 9, 2006.
- "Ingenuity and madness?" – Malcolm Miller, "Music & Vision Daily" December 24, 2005
- "From Irish Eyes to Short Attention Spans" -Frank J. Oteri & John Schaefer, Soundcheck (WNYC), New York, March 17, 2005
- "Got a Minute? A Few Words on Music in 60 Seconds or Less" -Robert Voisey with additional reporting by Frank J. Oteri, "NewMusicBox" May 1, 2004

=== Further reading ===
- Tsabary, Eldad. "[Sonus Gallery] 60x60 Canada 2008–09." eContact! 11.2 — Figures canadiennes (2) / Canadian Figures (2) (July 2009). Montréal: CEC.

== See also ==
- List of electronic music festivals
