= Hettie Vyrine Barnhill =

American dancer

Hettie Vyrine Barnhill, is a choreographer-dancer raised in St Louis, Missouri. She started her dance career at the age of 3 at The Pelagie Green Wren Dance Studio. Barnhill made her Broadway debut in Fela!, a musical based on events in the life of groundbreaking Nigerian composer and activist Fela Anikulapo Kuti. Barnhill is a member of Sigma Gamma Rho sorority, one of the nine African-American sororities.

Hettie Barnhill also participated in the 60x60 project's 60x60 Dance at the World Financial Center Winter Garden Atrium and at The Sheldon in her hometown St Louis, Missouri. In 2011, Hettie Barnhill became the dance coordinator for 60x60 Dance performances at Dance Parade in New York City and at The Sheldon in St Louis, Missouri. - "It's the perfect mixture of improv and structure with the marriage of movement and music," Barnhill said.

In 2011 the NAACP honored Hettie Barnhill for her work as a singer, dancer, actress and choreographer. The award honors her achievement in arts and culture. Barnhill describes it as particularly meaningful because the entertainment business often focuses on looks, not character. "(That world) can be very superficial, and it can be taxing on your spirit," she said. "I know that's what I do, and I love it, but this award kind of makes it worth all the hardships that come with being an artist."
