= D. E. Jones =

D. E. Jones may refer to:

- David Evan Jones (missionary), Welsh missionary
- Denny Jones, Oregon rancher and politician
- David Evan Jones (composer), American composer

== See also ==
- Jones (surname)
