= Wildish =

Wildish is a surname. Notable people with the surname include:

- D. B. H. Wildish (1914–2017), vice admiral in the Royal Navy and centenarian
- Katharine Wildish (born 1959), American ballerina
