= Patrick Liddell =

American classical composer

Patrick Liddell is a composer and video artist living in Oakland, California. He earned his Doctor of Music from Northwestern University in 2009. His thesis is titled "Arrow To The Sun: Postmodernism As Compositional Tool", which outlines the contextual processes in postmodernist art, as well as includes a detailed description of the compositional, theoretical, and contextual framework for all his output. The music from "Arrow To The Sun" was the basis for Liddell's first solo studio release.

== Career ==
He has worked as a member of many ensembles within many genres, including The Zvooks (ska, reggae, Chicago/Germany), Function Ensemble (progressive rock, Melbourne/Chicago), Maurice (math rock, Chicago), The University of Chicago Gamelan, aperiodic (art music, Chicago), The University of California, Berkeley Gamelan (Javanese, Sari Raras), Gamelan Encinal (new music, Mills College, Oakland, CA), Gamelan Sekar Jaya (Balinese, Berkeley, CA), Steady Eddy And The Shakers (soul and funk covers, San Francisco), and ANiMA Art And Music (electronic, Seattle).

Liddell has regularly performed live and improvised video as a guest with countless groups in Chicago and the San Francisco Bay Area, as well as his own video/music/art under the moniker ontologist. He designed Macintosh video software for this purpose, called ONTOplayer, which he released from Canzona Software in 2009. His own music is an eclectic blend of 'art' and 'popular' styles, with direct references to jazz, soul, reggae, Renaissance, electronic, ethnic, progressive rock, Minimalism, video game, and film music. He has also designed and released Cantor's Comb: The Card Game, an original 64-card game featuring the music from the four albums in the cycle, on Canzona Games, in late 2020.

Liddell is most known for his video art experiment on YouTube "Video Room 1000", an homage to Alvin Lucier.

He is also known for his audio work and video collaborations with Vox Novus's 60x60. In 2009, he created a video collaboration for the 60x60 2009 International Mix. In 2010 he created 360 one-minute videos in a collaboration for the project's 6 different hour-long "RED" mixes, with subsequent performances throughout the United States and internationally. The screening of this collaboration at the San Francisco Outsound Festival was hailed by Jason Victor Serinus, Special to The Examiner, "Expect it to stretch whatever boundaries you may not have thought you had."

Liddell has taught music composition and theory at DePaul University., and until 2023 worked at The Quarry Lane School in Dublin, California, as music director and coordinator of visual and performing arts, also teaching International Baccalaureate courses in performance and composition.

== Discography ==
- Arrow To The Sun (dissertation thesis, CD/DVD release, 2009)
- The Book Of Lists (First of Cantor's Comb album cycle, CD, 2011)
- Exit (Second of Cantor's Comb cycle, CD, 2014)
- Pauli's Dreams (Third of Cantor's Comb cycle, vinyl, 2017)
- Cantor's Comb (Fourth and final of Cantor's Comb cycle, double vinyl, 2021)
- Cantor's Jams (Remix album of Cantor's Comb cycle, online release, 2022)

== Articles ==
- What Happens To A YouTube Video Uploaded 1,000 Times Huffington Post
- "What Happens to a YouTube Video After 1,000 Uploads?". Mashable. June 3, 2010. Video
- What Does a Video Look Like After 1000 YouTube Uploads? Gawker
- Musician Uploads Video of Himself to YouTube 1000 Times by Matthew Zuras -Switched – June 4, 2010
- ontologist - "Now I'm Gone" The Music Butcher, review—November 27, 2018
