= Athena Festival =

Biennial music festival in Murray, Kentucky, U.S.

The Athena Festival is a biennial event celebrating women in music. The festival is sponsored by the Department of Music at Murray State University in Murray, Kentucky. The Athena festival strives to promote women composers and inspire young women with their musical aspirations

In 2011, The Athena festival helped create the first all women 60x60 mix named after the festival. The 60x60 Athena Mix was curated and coordinated by Sabrina Peña Young.

The theme of the 2013 Athena Festival is "Breaking Barriers—Finding Her Own Voice."

== Featured Scholars and Composers ==
- 1999 Karin Pendle and Barbara Harbach-George
- 2001 Adrienne Fried Block and Barbara Honn
- 2003 Judith Tick, Peggy Seeger, and Sara Carina Graf
- 2005 Nancy B. Reichand and Lori Laitman
- 2007 Helen Walker-Hill
- 2009 Judith Lang Zaimont
- 2013 Gwyneth Walker
