= Zlatko Ćosić =

- Born: 1972; Banja Luka, Yugoslavia
- Known for: Video Art, Experimental Video, Documentary Film, Performance, Video installation, Photography, Audio Visual Performance, VJing, Projection Mapping
- Website: www.zlatkocosic.com

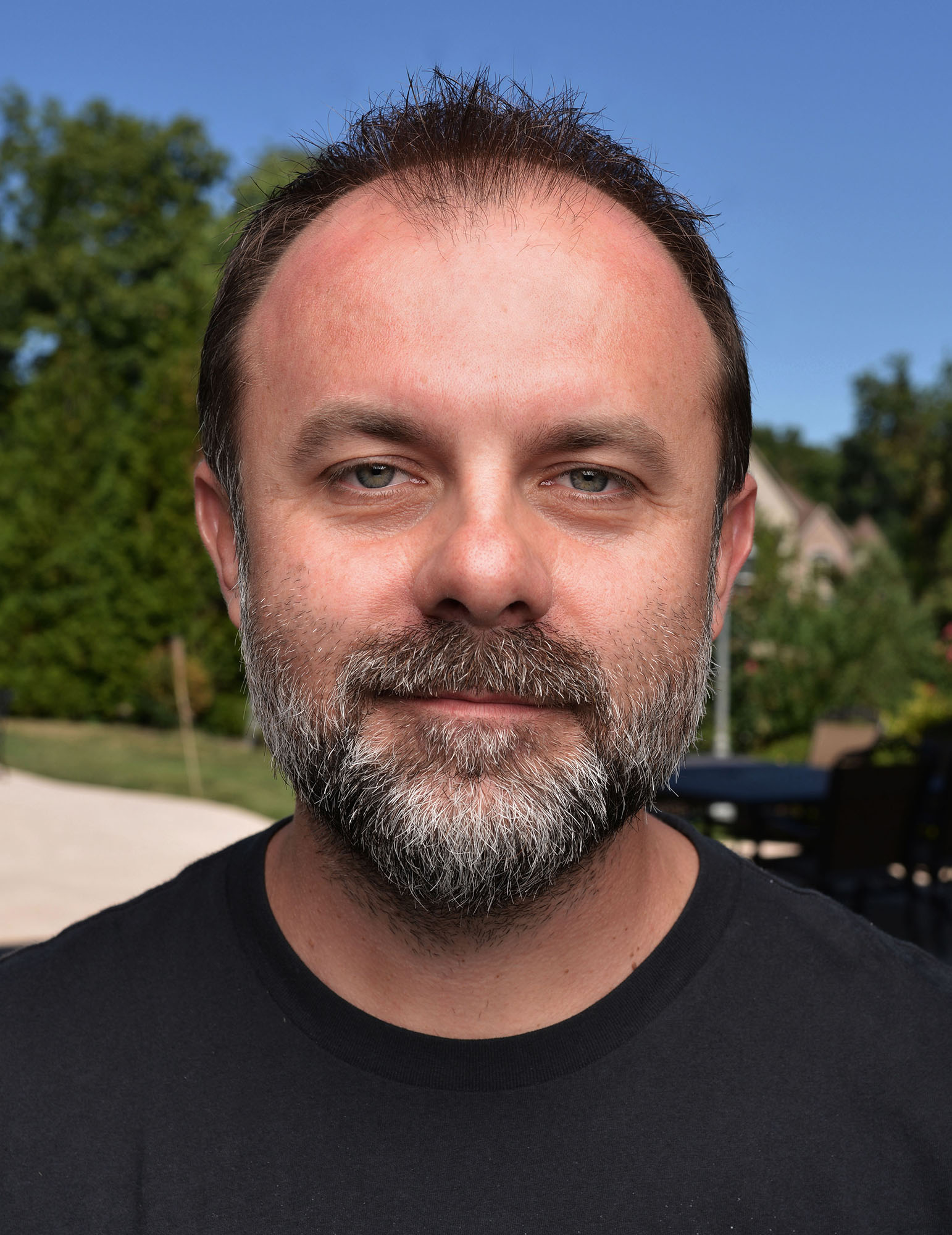

Zlatko Ćosić is a video artist born in Banja Luka, Yugoslavia whose work includes short films, video installations, theater and architectural projections, and audio-visual performances. Ćosić's experience as a refugee influenced and shaped the content of his early artistic practice. His work began with the challenges of immigration and shifting identities, evolving to socio-political issues related to injustice, consumerism, and climate crisis. Ćosić's artwork has been shown in over fifty countries in exhibitions such as the Contemporary Art Museum St. Louis, Ann Arbor Film Festival, Video Vortex XI at Kochi-Muziris Biennale, ZKM Center for Art and Media Karlsruhe, St. Louis International Film Festival, Torrance Art Museum, Alchemy Film & Moving Image Festival, /si:n/ Video Art and Performance Biennale, Institut Für Alles Mögliche, the Pulitzer Arts Foundation, Kunstverein Kärnten, Art Speaks Out at 2022 United Nations Climate Change Conference, and the Research Pavilion at the 57th Venice Biennale. Ćosić has received grants and fellowships including the Regional Arts Commission Artist Fellowship, a Kranzberg Grant for a video installation at Laumeier Sculpture Park, and the WaveMaker Grant, Locust Projects, supported by the Andy Warhol Foundation.

Since 1997, he lives and works in St. Louis.

== Work ==
Ćosić's video Horizons has been an official selection at film festivals in the United States, Australia, Denmark, France, Germany, and Poland and was a prize winner at the 2010 St. Louis Filmmakers Showcase, the 2010 Macon Film Festival, and the 2010 Sunscreen Film Festival. Ćosić's video Elans won the Pulitzer's Film Competition in St. Louis and it was finalist at the Digital Graffiti festival in Florida. His video Spaces was screened in numerous film festivals in North America and Europe and won an award at the St. Louis International Film Festival. Ćosić's video Story 1: Scenes 1-9 won Best Experimental Film and his video Descend won Best Sound at the St. Louis Filmmakers Showcase. His video installation Un-Pollute won Jury Prize, Networked Disruptions exhibition at Finger Lakes Environmental Film Festival. He collaborated with the 60x60 Project creating 200 videos, which have been presented at the Spark Festival, TNA TV in France, EMM Festival, LOOP Videoart Festival, Printemps Musical d'Annecy, Kulturkiosken Gallery, Stimultania Art Gallery and at other venues in France, Spain, Sweden, Serbia and USA. He presented his work and collaborated with St. Louis Symphony Orchestra, New Music Circle and HEARding Cats Collective. Ćosić's solo exhibition Still Adjusting at Gallery 210 was reviewed in the June 2014 issue of Art in America.

Ćosić's artwork has been exhibited at the Contemporary Art Museum, Kemper Art Museum, Regional Arts Commission, Gallery 210, Cecille R. Hunt Gallery, Sheldon Art Galleries, Des Lee Gallery, Arcade Gallery, and Laumeier Sculpture Park, all in St. Louis; UCM Gallery of Art & Design, Warrensburg, MO; Project 4 Gallery, Washington DC; Hunter Time Square Gallery, New York; Harold Golen Gallery, Miami; PUBLIC Gallery, Louisville; Kulturprojekte, Berlin; Kulturkiosken Gallery, Gävle, Sweden; Atelje 26, Students' City Cultural Center, Belgrade, Serbia; Pinnacles Gallery, Townsville, Australia; Academy of Fine Arts, Sarajevo, Bosnia and Herzegovina; JCIC Vilnius & Kedainiai Regional Museum, Lithuania; Patarei "The Battery" Prison, Tallinn, Estonia; Torrance Art Museum, Los Angeles; Stimultania Art Gallery, Strasbourg, France; HIEDRA Gallery, Buenos Aires, Argentina; and neo:gallery 23, Bolton, UK.

Ćosić's videos also have screened at Saint Louis Art Museum; Alchemy Film and Moving Image Festival, Scotland; St. Louis International Film Festival; USA Film Festival; Belgrade Alternative Film and Video Festival; Picture This Film Festival; Byron Bay International Film Festival; Herning International Short Film Festival; Festival Franco-Anglais De Poésie; Performance & Intermedia Festival, Poland; dokumentART Festival; Lightselect Teofilo, P4 Kuntshouse; PÖFF's Sleepwalkers Film Festival; Les Instants Vidéo Festival, Marseille; Torun Short Film Festival; CologneOFF: Latvia, Lebanon, Mexico and India; Atlanta Underground Film Festival; Vegas Independent Film Festival; Festival Internacional De Videoarte, Argentina; Espacio AVAart Gallery, Spain; Institut Für Alles Möglische, Berlin; XX.9.12 FABRIKArte, Venice; Zeta Gallery, Albania; East Art Gallery, Iran; Holdudvar Gallery, Hungary; Vizii Festival, National Historical and Architectural Museum, Ukraine; Crosstalk Video Art Festival, Hungary; VIDEOPLAY, Peras De Olmo - Ars Continua, Buenos Aires; Regional Museum of History of Colima, Mexico; Now&After, International Video Art Festival, Moscow Museum of Modern Art; The Format, Contemporary Culture Gallery, Italy; Greensboro Dance Film Festival; Dance Film Festival UK, London; Qorikancha Museum, Peru; Forever Now, Faux Mo, Australia; Dança em Foco, International Festival of Video and Dance, Brazil; Carnival of e-Creativity, India; La Casa Encendida, Spain; Octubre Centre de Cultura Contemporània, Spain; Palais de Glace, Argentina; Montana Film Festival; Lucca Film Festival, Italy; CINEMAMBIENTE, Italy; FIVAC, Cuba; Digital Image, Espacio Enter Canarias, Spain; Zentrum für Kunst und Medien Karlsruhe, Germany; Syracuse International Film and Media Festival, Italy; DesArts//DesCinés, Dance & Cinema Festival, France; Watch Out! Tetovo Film Festival, Macedonia; OtherMovie Lugano Film Festival, Switzerland; Artspace, Israel; Chaktomuk Short Film Festival, Cambodia; Viva Film Festival, Bosnia and Herzegovina; Addis Video Art Festival, Ethiopia; Quinzena de Dança de Almada, International Dance Festival, Portugal; Ţǎrii Crişurilor Museum, Romania; Sydney World Film Festival, Australia; STRANGLOSCOPE, Experimental Film, Audio & Performance Festival, Brazil; Noisefloor, Experimental Music and Moving Image Festival, UK; VIDEOMEDEJA, International Video Festival, Serbia; nodoCCS Video Art Festival, Venezuela; IBRIDA, Intermediate Arts Festival, Italy; Palestine Biennale /si:n/, Ramallah and Gaza, Palestine, 2019; Ann Arbor Film Festival, USA; and The Inaugural International Autonomous Biennale, The Research Pavilion, 57th Venice Biennale, Italy.

== Articles & Reviews ==
- "Mesh", Contemporary Art Museum St. Louis, 2017-2018
- "Movement In Harmony", Alyssa Knowling and Marcus Stabenow, AAH Storyteller, November 2018
- "Zlatko Ćosić's struggle between cultures and identity influences his art", Don Marsh/Mary Edwards, St. Louis Public Radio/NPR, October 13, 2017
- "Webster’s Zlatko Ćosić Portrays Nature Through Motion Painting", Yue Zhang, The Journal, November 16, 2016
- "Sounding the Bell: Zlatko Ćosić's "South Slavic Requiem", Stefene Russell, St. Louis Magazine, September 17, 2015
- "Video artist Zlatko Ćosić celebrates harmony, commemorates conflict in simultaneous exhibits", Steve Potter/Áine O’Connor, St. Louis Public Radio/NPR, October 16, 2015
- "Review of "Still Adjusting" exhibition at Gallery 210", Jessica Baran, Art in America, July 7, 2014
- "What’s in a Name", exhibition essay, Dana Turkovic, Curator of Exhibitions, Laumeier Sculpture Park, January, 2014
- "Seven Questions with Video Artist Zlatko Ćosić", Thomas Crone, St. Louis Magazine, January 23, 2014
- "St. Louis Artist Zlatko Ćosić On His Exhibition 'Still Adjusting', Steve Potter/Camille Phillips, St. Louis Public Radio/NPR, January 17, 2014
- Marquis, Cate (February 3, 2014). "Still Adjusting' at Gallery 210 explores artist Zlatko Cosic's experiences in U.S and Yugoslavia". The Current. Archived from the original on March 5, 2016.
- "‘Zlatko Cosic: Still Adjusting Closing Saturday", Bailey Dolenc, Gallery 210, UMSL, March 18, 2014
- "Bosnian native cooks food that reminds him of home", Pat Eby, STLtoday.com / St. Louis Post-Dispatch, February 6, 2008
- "The Projectionist" by Stefene Russell, St Louis Magazine, August 2007
- "A Bewildering International Hour" by Camilla Dal, Gefle Dagblad, Gävle, Sweden, March 25, 2009
- "Omtumlande internationell timme" by Camilla Dal, Gefle Dagblad, Gävle, Sweden, March 25, 2009
- "Drive By" by Mark Jenkins, Washington Post, February 4, 2011
- "Urban life, construction sites serve as muse for new Project 4 art exhibit" by Madeline Wolfson, The Eagle, February 14, 2011
- "Obećanja, Obećanja [Promises, Promises]" by Nisad Selimović, Oslobođenje, Sarajevo, May 30, 2012
