= Katharine Wildish =

Ballet dancer from the United States

Katharine "Kat" Wildish
- Born: 21 September 1959 (age 67); Tampa, Florida, U.S.
- Years active: 1974–2007
- Dancing career
- Former groups: New York City Ballet; Metropolitan Opera Ballet; American Ballet Theatre; Fokine Ballet
- Website: http://www.katwildish.com/

Katharine "Kat" Wildish (born 21 September 1959) is a ballerina from Tampa, Florida, U.S. She danced with the New York City Ballet (1981–1983), American Ballet Theatre (1985–1987), and performed as a guest artist for a number of companies worldwide before retiring from stage work in 2007.

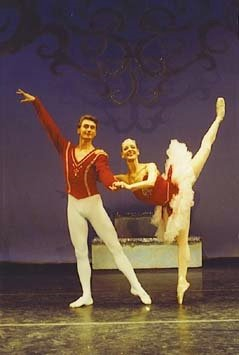
Kat Wildish and Slawomir Wozniak dancing The Nutcracker with the Fokine Ballet

Wildish is a Master Teacher of Ballet, certified from primary through Level 7 (the highest) of the ABT National Training Curriculum, and a proponent of dance education and performance for adults.

Wildish has also functioned as a director, producer, and choreographer.

== Early life and education ==
Katharine "Kat" Wildish was born in Tampa, Florida, U.S. At the age of 15, she toured the southern United States as a member of Ballet Gala. On a two-year full scholarship from the Ford Foundation, she was trained at the School of American Ballet. Wildish studied Vaganova, Cecchetti, Balanchine, and many other styles. "She was schooled in all of ballet’s great pedagogical traditions: Vaganova technique at Milan’s La Scala under the direction of Rudolf Nureyev, and studies with her personal coach, former Kirov ballerina Kaleria Fedicheva; Cechetti tutelage from her mentor and friend Dick Andros; and Balanchine style from her time at SAB."

== Career ==
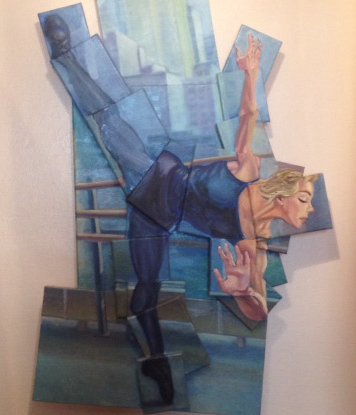
Kat Wildish, painting by Scott Rose

=== New York City Ballet ===
Wildish danced with the New York City Ballet from 1981 to 1983, where she performed a variety of Balanchine pieces. She was hand-picked to perform in Adagio Lamentoso, one of his last works.

=== American Ballet Theatre ===
Wildish danced with American Ballet Theatre (ABT) from 1985 to 1987. Under artistic direction of Mikhail Baryshnikov, she performed in traditional works. Sir Kenneth MacMillan, in his version of Sleeping Beauty for ABT, created the role of the "knitting lady" for Wildish.

=== Guest appearances ===
Wildish performed as a guest artist with a number of prominent companies, including The Metropolitan Opera Ballet, Zurich Ballet, Eglevsky Ballet, Bernhard Ballet, Connecticut Ballet, Louisville Ballet, The American Dance Machine, Dances Patrelle, Fokine Ballet (as the Sugar Plum Fairy), and the Eglevsky Ballet.

=== Critical review ===
Wildish was described by The New York Times as "a strong dancer with an adorably comic, wide-eyed presence," "a delightful young colt of a dancer," and "vivacious."

== Teacher and advisor ==
Wildish is a Certified Teacher of Primary through Level 7 (the highest) of the American Ballet Theatre National Training Curriculum. She participated in ABT's project of establishing uniform country-wide standards of instruction. She has trained and mentored other teachers, notably for the Dance Educators of America, and as a member of the U.S. Faculty of Education of the United Kingdom's Royal Academy of Dance.

An outspoken advocate for non-professional adult dance education and performance, Wildish states, "Once you get out of school, you know, adults just have class. What else do they have... unless the teacher organizes an opportunity?" In the span of a 40+ year career, Wildish has served as a faculty member of the Broadway Dance Center, Alvin Ailey Extension, and Peridance. She continues to teach in the New York City metropolitan area.

== Director, producer, choreographer ==
=== Performing in New York Showcase ===
Following her retirement in 2007, Wildish founded a dance variety show called the "Performing in New York Showcase," for which she functions as Producer and artistic director. This event is intended to give adult students an opportunity to perform, and a variety of dance companies are invited to participate. As part of this effort, Wildish also choreographs and stages an act danced by students from her classes.

=== New York City Festival of Dance Schools ===
Wildish produced the first annual NYC Festival of Dance Schools in 2011. This event showcases the top talent from prominent studios from New York City and surrounding areas.

=== New York City Dance Parade ===
Wildish served as the Grand Marshall of the New York City Dance parade in 2011.

=== Other work ===
"Awake" (1986) by Jonathan James was choreographed in collaboration with Wildish.

== Private life ==
Wildish is married to Arthur Coopchick, and resides in New York City.
