= Jeramy Zimmerman =

Jeramy Zimmerman is a founder and the director of CatScratch Theatre. CatScratch Theatre was founded in Washington DC in 2000 by Zimmerman, Krissie Marty, Jessica Hirst and Lisa Hetzel.

A native of Kansas City, she currently lives in Kansas City. She is an alumna of Stephens College in Columbia, MO and of Tisch School of the Arts in New York.

Zimmerman collaborated with the 60x60 project in 2006 and 2008. This collaboration has been named 60x60 Dance.

== Articles and reviews ==
- An Express Without Any Delays By ROSLYN SULCAS, New York Times, November 17, 2008
- Stephan Paschalides "60x60 Dance" TRENDTREKKING, October 27, 2008
- Deborah Jowitt "September Songs" Village Voice, September 12, 2005
