= Cleo Parker Robinson =

American dancer and choreographer (born 1948)

- Born: July 17, 1948 (age 78); Denver, Colorado, U.S.
- Education: The University of Denver
- Occupation: Modern dance choreographer
- Website: CleoParkerDance.org

Cleo Parker Robinson (born July 17, 1948 in Denver, Colorado) is an American dancer and choreographer. She is most known for being the founder, namesake and executive creative director of the Cleo Parker Robinson Dance Ensemble. She was inducted into the Colorado Women's Hall of Fame in 1989, and named to the National Council on the Arts by President Bill Clinton in 1999. In 2005 she also received a Kennedy Center Medal of Honor during the Center's "Masters of African American Choreographers" series.

== Early life ==
Parker Robinson is the daughter of an African-American actor and a white musician. She faced extreme prejudice while growing up in 1950s Denver. At the age of 10 she nearly died in Dallas when a segregated hospital refused to admit her for a kidney condition quickly enough to prevent heart failure. Doctors expected her to be bedridden the rest of her life. She overcame the condition and threw herself into dancing in order to overcome the pain from the physical condition and emotional challenges of dealing with racism. By age 15 she was already teaching University level dance classes at the University of Colorado. She graduated from Colorado Women's College, now a part of the University of Denver.

== Cleo Parker Robinson Dance Ensemble ==
She is most noted for founding the Cleo Parker Robinson Dance Ensemble in 1970. The ensemble is widely respected and recognized. It has toured internationally, performed at the Lincoln Center and received coverage and positive reviews from the New York Times, Washington Post, and LA Times Representative Mark Udall gave tribute to the ensemble on the floor of the US House of Representatives in 2005 to honor its 35th anniversary.

Notable performers with the ensemble have included Nejla Y. Yatkin, Cornelius Carter, Germaul Barnes and Leni Williams. They have also worked with costume designer Mary Jane Marcasiano.

One of her more notable artistic creations is "Lush Life," a jazz, poetry and dance collaboration she created together with Maya Angelou.

== Awards ==
Cleo Parker Robinson's awards include:

- 1974, Colorado Governor's Award for Excellence
- 1979, Denver Mayor's Award
- 1989, Inducted into the Colorado Women's Hall of Fame
- 1991, Honorary Doctorate of Fine Arts, University of Denver
- 1994, Inducted into the Blacks in Colorado Hall of Fame
- 2002, Chancellor's Distinguished Professor, University of California, Irvine
- 2003, Honorary Doctorate of Humane Letters, Colorado College
- 2005, Kennedy Center Medal of Honor
- 2007, Legend of Dance in Colorado, University of Denver
- 2008, Honorary Doctorate of Public Service, Regis University
- 2008, Civil Rights Award, Anti-Defamation League Western Chapter
- 2011, Denver & Colorado Tourism Hall of Fame
- 2017, Dance/USA Honor Award
- 2021, Honorary Doctor of Humane Letters, University of Colorado at Boulder, "For Extraordinary Contributions to Dance and the Arts Overall"
- 2026, Award of Merit for Achievement in the Performing Arts from Association of Performing Arts Professionals (APAP)
