= Allen Strange =

American composer

Allen Strange (June 26, 1943 – February 20, 2008) was an American composer. He authored two books, Electronic Music: Systems, Techniques, and Controls (first published in the 1970s) and Programming and Meta-Programming the Electro-Organism. He co-wrote The Contemporary Violin: Extended Performance Techniques with his wife, Patricia.

== Career ==
Strange was born in Calexico, California. He studied composition with Donal Michalsky at the California State University, Fullerton. He received his MA in 1967. He later studied composition with Robert Erickson, Harry Partch, and Ken Gaburo, and electronic media with Pauline Oliveros at the University of California, San Diego during 1967–68 and 1970–71.

In 1970, Strange became a professor of music and the director of the electronic music studios at San Jose State University.

He received grants from the San Jose State University Foundation for research into electronic music. Other grant support came from the American Music Center, Yamaha Corporation and the BIAHC Foundation. He attended John Chowning's music seminar at the Stanford University Artificial Intelligence Center. Strange was one of the leading authorities on analogue electronic music; his book Electronic Music: Systems, Techniques, and Controls is now a classic text. He also wrote Programming and Meta-Programming the Electro-Organism, the operations manual for the Buchla Music Easel and documented the 200 Series synthesizers made by Buchla. He co-founded two performance groups: Biome (1967–1972), in order to make use of the EMS Synthi; and, with Don Buchla in 1974, the Electric Weasel Ensemble. He was president of the International Computer Music Association from 1993 to 1998, and appeared as a guest artist-lecturer throughout the world. With his wife, Patricia, they published The Contemporary Violin: Extended Performance Techniques (Scarecrow Press).

Strange composed for live electronic instrumental ensembles, for live and taped electronics with voices and acoustic instruments, and for the theater; most of his works for acoustic instruments require extended performance techniques. He was particularly interested in linear tuning systems (as in The Hairbreadth Ring Screamers, 1969, and Second Book of Angels, 1979), spatial distribution of sound (Heart of Gold, 1982, and Velocity Studies, 1983), the isolation of timbre as a musical parameter, and composing for groups of like instruments or voices. Elements of vaudeville, rock-and-roll, country-and-western music, and the guitar techniques of Les Paul are found in his works. His theater pieces employ various media including film, video, and lighting effects; he produced a series of such works in collaboration with the playwright and director Robert Jenkins, of which the most important are Jack and the Beanstalk (1979) and The Ghost Hour (1981), an audio drama. His later projects include works for solo and small ensembles (Three Short Stories, 2005), continuation of the Goddess Trilogy for solo violin (Goddess, 2003), works for electronic media with and without acoustic instruments (Quinault Cathedral, 2004 and Velocity Studies V: NGate, 2007), compositions for various chamber ensembles (Songs in Black, 2005, Another Fine Mess, 2006), works for orchestra (Bainbridge Sketches, 2006 and Brief Visits to Imaginary Places, 2007) and a complete evening of settings of poems by Eugene Field, The Cautionary Tales of Eugene Field, 2006–07).

Strange retired from academia in 2002 and moved to Bainbridge Island, Washington to pursue a full-time career composing, concertizing with his wife, and working with his jazz trio, Cuvée. He died on February 20, 2008, in Seattle, Washington.

== Literary publications ==
- Electronic Music: Systems, Techniques, and Controls (1972)
- Programming and Meta-Programming the Electro-Organism (1974)
- The Contemporary Violin: Extended Performance Techniques By Patricia Strange and Allen Strange. Scarecrow Press, Inc. (2001)

== Discography ==
- Velocity Study No. 3: Rip - The Electro-Acoustic Piano vol. 1, Thinking outLOUD Records
- Ghost Strings
- Ghost Tracks
- White Lady - MetaSynthia 3.2
- Return to Misty Magic Land - 60x60 (2004–2005) Vox Novus VN-001
- Shadow Boxer - 60x60 (2003) Capstone Records CPS-8744
- Moon + Moon C.R.E.A.M. CD 1001,
- Sleeping Beauty - Consortium to Distribute Computer Music Series Volume 18, Centaur Recordings
- Shaman - Consortium to Distribute Computer Music Series Volume 26, Centaur Recordings
- Music for Guitar and Tape - Consortium to Distribute Computer Music Series Volume 17, Centaur Recordings
- Velocity Studies IV: - International Computer Music Conference 1992 Compact Disc, Executive Producer, ICMC'92
- Flutter for alto saxophone and prerecorded media, Capstone Records
- Uncle Erhard - Audiozine Recordings
- Dangerous Nights a collection of recorded stories with Robert Jenkins, Strange and Jenkins Productions.
- The Thirty-Seventh Letter - Frogs Hollow Recordings.
- Velocity Study V: NGate on "Flamethrower" New Music for Trumpet/Flugelhorn and Interactive Electronics (Stephen Ruppenthal, performer), Ravello Records
- Misty Magic Land on "Flamethrower" New Music for Trumpet/Flugelhorn and Interactive Electronics (Stephen Ruppenthal, performer), Ravello Records

== Interviews ==
- Interview on Camel Audio

== Articles and Reviews ==
- Toronto Metropolitan University: TMU Professor Raises Nearly $270,000 To Reprint Music Theory Textbook By Iednewsdesk On Oct 27, 2022
- Electric Company (archived) By Mary Ann Cook, Los Gatos Weekly Times
- The Contemporary Violin: Extended Performance Techniques (review) by Michael Steinberg, Project MUSE - Volume 59, Number 2, December 2002, pp. 352–354
- Allen Strange, 64, electro-music guru By Patrick May, Mercury News, Published 26 February 2008
- Remembering Allen By Gary Singh, Metro Silicon Valley, Published 27 February 2008
- New musical milestone Annual CSUS festival turns 25; many composers will be in town to present their works and discuss them The Sacramento Bee, Published on November 3, 2002
- HE CHOOSES A STRANGE WAY TO ACCEPT AN AWARD PAUL HERTELENDY, Mercury News Music Writer, Published on April 29, 1989, Page 2C, San Jose Mercury News (CA)
