= Sabrina Peña Young =

21st-century American classical composer

Sabrina Peña Young is an American composer and percussionist.

== Early life ==
Young grew up in South Florida, the daughter of Dominican and Cuban parents. She spent her early years performing in orchestras, alternative bands, and avant-garde ensembles. Young started playing percussion at the age of 10. Young is a third-generation musician. Her grandmother was a professional opera singer in Cuba. Her mother was an amateur pianist, and father was an engineer. Her sister also became a musician and played piano. Both practiced long hours as children. Young's childhood home emphasized music, practice, and hard work.

== Career ==
While at the University of South Florida in 2000, Young joined SYCOM (Systems Complex for the Recording and Performing Arts). In college she studied under Dr. Clare Shore and Paul Reller. She worked at Atlantic Productions under Emmy-winning director Charles Lyman as a student at University of South Florida in Tampa.

Young received the American Music Centers CAP grant for the multimedia percussion work World Order #5 in 2008. Young is a prolific author on new music, and published in SAI Panpipes, Percussive Notes, Notations 21, the IAWM Journal, the SEAMUS Music Journal, the Kapralova Society Journal, and other music publications.

Her futuristic multimedia oratorio Creation won the New Genre Award from the International Alliance for Women in Music in 2011. Collaborations included writing the film score for Emmy-winning animator Rob Cabrera, the interactive opera The Village with UK composer Lee Scott, and the director Sean Fleck's Americana. In 2015 Young published her debut novel Libertaria: Genesis as an addendum to her online work Libertaria: The Virtual Opera.

Her multimedia works have been performed at the Beijing Conservatory, the International Computer Music Conference, Project Greenlight, the Athena Festival, the New York International Independent Film Festival, Art Basel Miami, Turkey's Cinema for Peace, and Pulsefield International Exhibition of Sound Art. Young is a member of the New York Women Composer's Association, the International Alliance for Women in Music, and the Buffalo Movie and Video Makers.

In 2021 Young's Libertaria Cycle was released as part of the Grammy-Nominated classical album series Sonidos Cubanos. The album included work by Tania Leon, Ileana Perez Velazquez, Orlando Jacinto Garcia, and Sergio Barroso. In 2022 Young joined the Board of the International Alliance for Women in Music.

== Film and media ==
Young has been in forty film productions as composer, director, writer, or crew. In 2005 Young's World Order #2 was premiered at Gürşat Özdamar's Cinema for Peace in Turkey, where 100 filmmakers presented 100 short films on "Peace". World Order #2 was the second in a series of new media and musical works about war and its effects on society.

An advocate for women composers, Young curated 2011 and 2012 Athena 60x60 Mix with Vox Novus director Robert Voisey. The 60x60 Athena mix contains 60 one-minute works form 60 different female composers. Her video for the 2011 60x60 Athena mix to creates a multimedia performance containing 60 one-minute audio works from women composers accompanied with video.

Young's work Creation won the New Genre Prize from the 2011 International Alliance for Women in Music Search for New Music.

In 2013 Young released Libertaria: The Virtual Opera, a 55-minute machinima movie with original script, soundtrack and animated visuals created by Young. The title "Virtual Opera" refers to the fact that there were no real-world rehearsals and the cast contributed their recordings from around the world via the internet. The movie can be viewed online, and there is an accompanying soundtrack recording and novelisation available. Libertaria:The Virtual Opera was screened at New York City's Opera America in 2015. The score of Libertaria:The Virtual Opera is a combination of traditional musical theater/opera, electroacoustic music, and jazz. Critics have called the production "groundbreaking" and "Wagner 2.0." The opera cast included Joe Cameron, Perry R. Cook, Gracia Gillund, Jennifer Hermansky, Matthew Meadows, Kate Sikora, Gretchen Suarez-Pena and Yvette Teel.

Young presented a TEDx Talk at TedxBuffalo in 2014 in Buffalo, New York, on "Singing geneticists and EPIC cyberspace machinima operas." In 2014 Young presented Libertaria at the Women Composers Festival at Hartford, speaking on virtual opera production and internet collaboration. and the WNY Women in Arts Festival in Buffalo, New York.

In 2015 Young produced the music documentary The Opera Heard Round the World: Internet Collaboration and the 21st Century Composer. Young produced films Welcome to Space Force and The Cure, which premiered in Buffalo, New York, in 2018. Welcome to Space Force premiered at the Buffalo Dreams Fantastic Film Festival. Young directed student film Noel's Spaceship premiered at the Buffalo International Film Festival in 2019.

In 2019, Young's animated short film Spiritus had its world premiere at the Buffalo Dreams Fantastic Film Festival. The festival presented Young with the Lois Weber Award which recognizes the accomplishments of women who have distinguished themselves in the art of filmmaking.

== Film scores ==
Young wrote the film scores for Little Green People, Spiritus, Monica, Not Another Monster Movie, The Present and the Passed, Murder Zone, and Americana. Emmy-winning director Rob Cabrera animated, produced, and directed a young Bailee Madison in the award-winning animated short Monica. Monica premiered in 2012. Young produced music for Kalup Linzy's Conversations wit de Churen II: All My Churen.

== Music works ==
=== Percussion works ===
Young composed Fluidity for marimba and video, Folds of the Mind for mixed chamber ensemble and percussion, Agape for marimba quartet in 2001, and Cancion for marimba in 1999. The Heartland Marimba Quartet presented music by American composers including Sabrina Pena Young's work Agape March 9, 2017.

=== Other instrumental works ===
Young composed Fate Laughs at Me for bassoon, Danza de la Muerta: Gebroken Clown for string orchestra, Downward Spiral for Strings, Airborn Sand for flute solo, Asphixivision for string quartet, A Glass of Water Lights the World for solo cello in 2003, and Horizon for full orchestra in 2001. In 2022 Young's string quartet Asphixivision was premiered at Zimmerman's Cafe featuring the work of South Florida classical composers.

=== Vocal works ===
Young composed the multimedia choral work The Creation Oratorio in 2010, and wrote "Light" for soprano and piano in 2012. Young's "Libertaria Song Cycle" was premiered at the third New Music Miami Festival concert, featuring the music of FIU alumni February 6, 2019. Young's Libertaria Song Cycle was published as part of the Cintas Foundation Sonidos Cubanos 2 Cuban music anthology in 2021.

=== Electroacoustic works ===
Enigma and Innermost Thoughts of the Distorted Psyche (2004) use complex computer-generated soundscapes and moving visual abstraction. US vs Them (2006), was written for the Kansas State University Percussion Ensemble. The Millikin University Percussion Ensemble premiered Young's work virelaan for percussion ensemble and multimedia at the Albert Taylor Theater in 2008 for their Special Annual Halloween Concert. In 2008 Young released her debut electroacoustic album Origins.

Sabrina Pena Young's works "Creation" for percussion ensemble, women's choir and mixed media and her work "Virelaan" percussion ensemble and mixed media were premiered by the Millikin Chamber Percussion Ensemble in 2009. American Recall was inspired by an automated voicemail from a prominent grocery chain about maggots found in Similac baby formula. "American Recall" (2009) is a short commentary on consumerism (tape). "American Recall" was part of the 2014 New Horizons Festival at the TSU Art Gallery, curated by Robert Martin. Looking Glass (2009) was part of the first annual Soundcrawl Nashville event. Young's album A Futuristic Music Anthology: The Electroacoustic Mind of Sabrina Peña Young came out in 2014. In 2016 Young's "Martian Morning Edition" arranged an electroacoustic version of the NPR Morning Edition music theme. NPR interviewed Young on her process, "You hear the original soundtrack but backwards, almost like some sort of bizarre echo from a different universe or something that's just trying to get through."

== Writing ==
Sabrina Peña Young writes music instruction, practice and activism but also writes fiction, poetry and children's books.

- "Women in Sound Art: 7 Musical Micro-Portraits" by Sabrina Pena Young, TERZ Magazine (2012)
- Composer Boot Camp 101: 50 Exercises for Educators, Students and Music Professionals (Volume 1) (2016)
- Filmmaking Crash Course: 30 Exercises for Educators, Students, and Filmmakers (2018)
- The Feminine Musique: Multimedia and Women Today and "On Writing for Multimedia" (2021)
- "Through Her Eyes: The Composer's Voice" by Sabrina Pena Young
- Songwriting 101: 30 Exercises for Educators, Students, and Music Professionals (2021)
- Libertaria: Genesis (Libertaria Chronicles) (Volume 1)
- Songwriter's Secrets Series by Sabrina Pena Young
- Libertaria: Revelation (Libertaria Chronicles) (Volume 2)
- Dream the Dreams of God: 99 Ways You Can End Poverty
- "Music & Life: The Power of Rhythm" by Sabrina Pena Young
- "The Difference Between Hearing and Listening: Deep Listening with Composer Pauline Oliveros" by Sabrina Pena Young
- Music, Women, and Technology: 7 Essays (21st Century Women Composers Book 2.
- "The 5 Fundamentals for Success in Music" by Sabrina Pena Young
- The Compositional Collective: Crowdsourcing and Collaboration in the Digital Age by Sabrina Pena Young
- Intermedia: Redefining American Music by Sabrina Peña Young
- "Open Your Ears to Modern Electronic Opera" on Musical U by Sabrina Pena Young

== Awards ==
2011 Sabrina Peña Young received a New Genre Award from the International Alliance for Women in Music for her work "Creation.

Young's animated science fiction opera Libertaria: The Virtual Opera was nominated for Best Animation and Best Short Feature at the 2016 Buffalo Dreams Fantastic Film Festival.

Buffalo Movie and Video Makers awarded Young's short film Murder Zone first place in their annual March film competition and the Distinguished Member award for 2017 for high achieving filmmakers. Young's short films Murder Zone and The Pearl of Tia Maria Magdalena were official selections for the Buffalo Dreams Fantastic Film Festival 2017. Welcome to Space Force was an official selection for the 2018 Buffalo Dreams and Fantastic Film Festival and nominated for "Best Western New York short."

In 2018 Young won honorable mention for Best Original Score Award for director Grace McAlister's The Present and the Passed for the Independent Shorts Awards.

In 2018, Young was awarded the Cintas Foundation's Brandon Fradd Fellowship in Music Composition for "a distinguished award for composers of Cuban descent."

Young's animated film Spiritus was the Official Selection at the Buffalo Dreams Fantastic Film Festival and had its world premiere in 2019. Spiritus was nominated for Outstanding Animated Short at the Buffalo Dreams Fantastic Film Festival. Young produced The Cure which was an Official Selection of the Buffalo Dreams Fantastic Film Festival in 2019. Young directed the student film Noel's Spaceship, which premiered at the Buffalo International Film Festival in 2019.

Young was the Winner of the Lois Weber Filmmaker Award, presented at the Buffalo Dreams Fantastic Film Festival. The award is named in honor of Lois Weber (1879 – 1939), the first female film director in the United States, and recognizes the accomplishes of women who have distinguished themselves in the art of filmmaking.

== Articles and reviews ==
- 'Halloween concert highlights Millikin percussion'
- "Light: A Mother's Journey – Sabrina Peña Young", illuminatewomensmusic.co.uk
- 'Morning Edition' Sci-Fi Theme Is Out Of This World' NPR Heard on Morning Edition – May 18, 20165:02 AM ET
- Aviva Players to Host Double Feature of Chamber Opera Films by Broadway World
- "Creating and Composing with Confidence with Sabrina Pena Young" by Musical U
- Cosmos and Well-Charted Waters' by David Patterson The Boston Musical Intelligencer – May 20, 2021
- "5 questions to Sabrina Peña Young on her virtual opera Libertaria" – Thea Derks i care if you listen – October 3, 2013, at 1:00 pm
- From Cuba with Love: Sonidos Cubanos 2
- Sonidos Cubanos 2 by Take Effect
- New News from Neuma: Juraj Jojs, Imagine, Sonidos Cubanos 2, Ros Bandt: Medusa Dreaming by George W. Harris
- Sonidos Cubanos by All About the Arts
