= Germaul Barnes =

American dancer

Germaul Barnes (born June 2, 1971) is a dancer and choreographer and founder of Viewsic Dance. He received the 2003 Bessie Award.

Barnes was born in Phoenix, Arizona, where he studied at The Center of Performing Arts at South Mountain High School, Phoenix School of Ballet and Ballet Arizona. He continued his dance training at the University of the Arts-Philadelphia. In the early part of his career, he performed with Bill T. Jones/Arine Zane Dance Company, Cleo Parker Robinson Dance Ensemble, Jose Tmim, Movement Source Dance Company, Group Motions Dance Company, Pacific Conservatory Theatre and as guest performer with numerous ballet and contemporary dance company worldwide.

As Director of VD his work has been seen at Central Park Summer Stage, Institute of Contemporary Arts/Boston, and The Kumble Theater for the Performance Arts and the International Dance Theater in Lublin, Poland, and Kulturhuset in Stockholm, Sweden and The Yakub Kolas National Academic Drama Theatre in Vitebsk, Russia. In 2015 he choreographed an original musical based on the life of Bob Marley.

He has taught at the University of Illinois at Champaign-Urbana, Belarus International Modern Dance Festival, Boroditski Denis Dance Camp, Dance Immersions, National Theater of Ghana, Lublin International Dance Festival, Joffery Ballet Jazz & Contemporary Intensive, Restorations Plaza Youth Arts Academy, and Dance Olympus.

Germaul has received critical acclaim for his work across the globe, including his choreography and performance in the 60x60 project's 60x60 Dance at the World Financial Center Winter Garden Atrium.
