= Cezary Ostrowski =

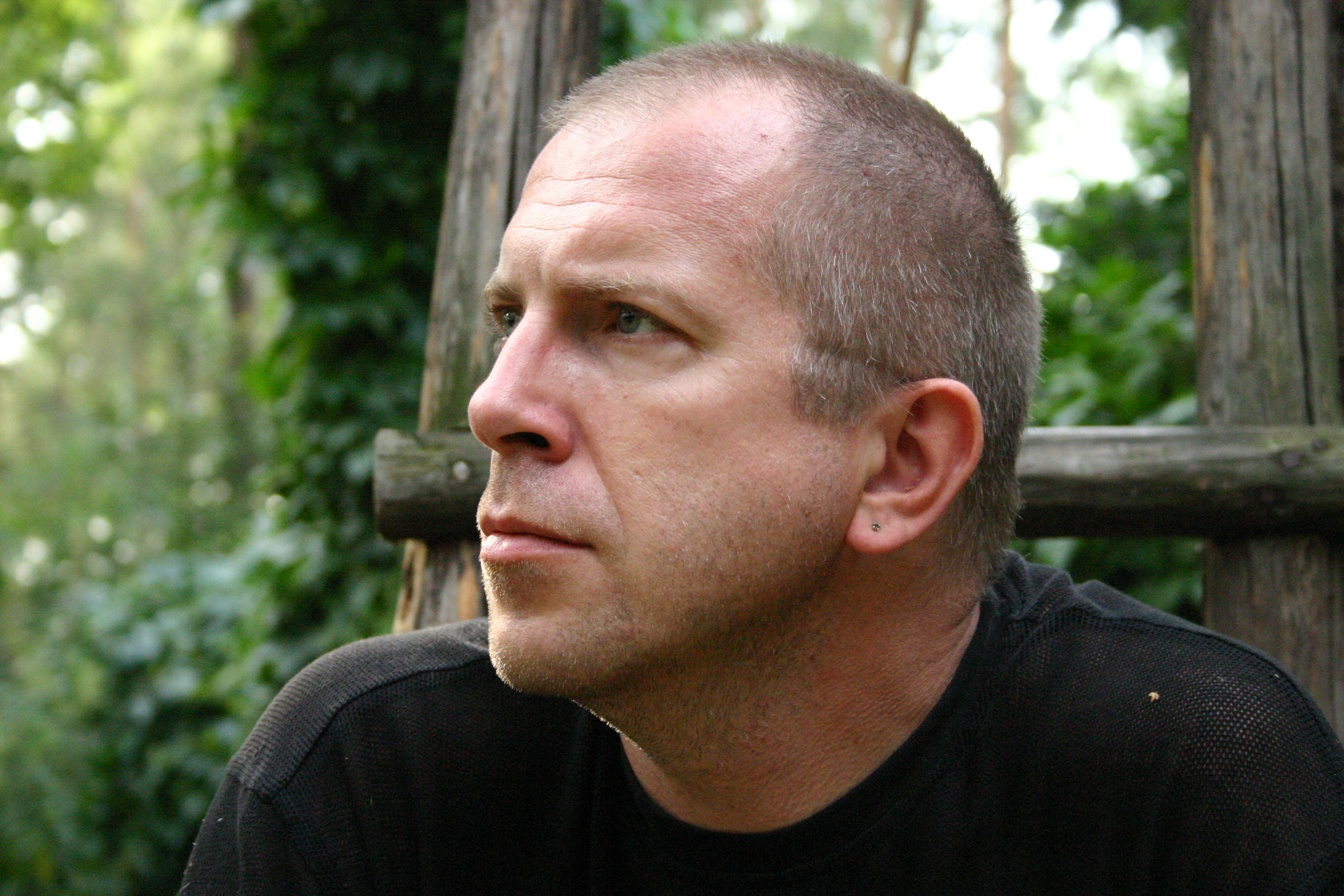
- Cezary Ostrowski in 2005

Background information
- Also known as: Cezary Fish
- Born: 30 September 1962 (age 62)
- Origin: Brzeg, Poland
- Genres: Avant-garde, punk, punk jazz, classical, new wave, techno, experimental rock, noise rock, grindcore, country, dark ambient, dub, easy listening, jazz
- Occupation(s): Composer, producer
- Instrument(s): Sampler, guitar, keyboards, percussion
- Years active: 1980–present
- Labels: MyHouse, Sonic
- Website: bexalala.bandcamp.com

Cezary Maciej Ostrowski (born 30 September 1962) is a Polish composer, musician, songwriter, author, visual artist and journalist.

Ostrowske was born in Brzeg, Lower Silesia. He is best known for his work as a leader of the critically acclaimed new wave band Bexa Lala, established in 1983. Before that, he had fronted the groups: Taz and Leo Patett in the early 1980s, bands renowned for their rough, and violent sound influenced by free jazz, electronica, and post-punk. In 2001, he formed the jazz duo Trzaska & Ostrowski that released the album Blades. In 2003 his another duo Swietlicki & Ostrowski released the album Crawl. Ostrowski's music is generally characterised by intensity and a wide variety of influences.

Cezary Ostrowski's work was selected for 60x60 International mix in 2005.

Cezary Ostrowski lives in Poznań, Poland.

Ostrowski The-Rite-of-Springs

== Youth and education ==
Ostrowski was born in the small town of Brzeg in the Lower Silesia, Poland, to Izabela and Tomasz Ostrowski.

As a child, Ostrowski lived in Brzeg and then Zielona Góra in Poland. His father Tomasz was a lawyer, with a love of literature, and his mother was a teacher. In spite of this Ostrowski was often in trouble with the local school authorities. In 1977 his family moved to Poznań. After his secondary schooling, Ostrowski studied drawing (Fine Art) at the Academy of Fine Arts in Poznań.

=== Work with other artists ===
Cezary Ostrowski has also played with Mikolaj Trzaska, Olga Jackowska, Marcin Swietlicki, Malgorzata Ostrowska, Piotr Bikont.
