= Nejla Y. Yatkin =

German-American choreographer (born 1970)

Nejla Yatkin
- Born: November 7, 1970; Berlin, Germany
- Other names: Nejla Yasemin Yatkin, Nezla Yatkin
- Education: Die Etage
- Occupation: Modern dance choreographer
- Known for: Creative, Thought-provoking, Multi-dimensional Dance Pieces
- Website: Official website

Nejla Y. Yatkin is a German-American choreographer.

== Career ==
Nejla Y. Yatkin is a 2008 Princess Grace Choreography Fellow (awarded by the Princess Grace Foundation in New York City) and an Artist in Residence at the University of Notre Dame. In 1993, Ms. Yatkin graduated from Die Etage a Performing Arts Conservatory in Berlin, Germany. Following this, she danced as a principal with numerous companies in Germany (Fountainhead Tanz Theater, Dance Butter Tokyo and Pyro Space Ballet [1992-1995]) as well as the United States (Cleo Parker Robinson [1996-1999] and Dayton Contemporary Dance Company [1999-2000]). She was critically acclaimed for her performance Stravinsky’s Firebird as “Firebird” with the Denver Symphony under the direction of Marion Alstop and choreographed by Cleo Parker Robinson. During this time, Ms. Yatkin worked with such leading choreographers as Donald McKayle, Eleo Pomare, Anzu Furukawa, Katherine Dunham, and Ron Brown among many others.

In 2000, Ms. Yatkin began choreographing solo works for herself inspired by Martha Graham and other great female choreographers who all started as soloists and later moved to choreograph on companies. To date, she has choreographed on the Cleo Parker Robinson Dance Ensemble, Dallas Black Dance Theatre, the Washington Ballet, the Maryland Dance Ensemble and the Baltimore Ballet. Her work has toured the world: Austria, Brazil, Canada, Colombia, Germany, Guatemala, El Salvador, England, France, India, Italy, Mexico, Russia, Scotland, Serbia, Santo Domingo, Taiwan, Ukraine, the United States and Yugoslavia. Additionally, it has been performed in some excellent venues. For example, as a Guest Choreographer with the Cleo Parker Robinson Dance Company, her work was commissioned and presented at Lincoln Center Out of Doors (2001) as well as the Joyce Theater (2003). Other venues include Dance Place and the John F. Kennedy Center for the Performing Arts (Washington, D.C.), The Place in London, England, Metropolitano in Medellin, Colombia and the Oscar Niemeyer Museum in Curitiba, Brazil among many others.

== Philosophy ==
In her choreography, she explores the beauty as well as complexity of memory, migration, transformation, identity and multiculturalism through movement. This is achieved by drawing upon diverse traditions of dance, cultures and medium. Through dance, Ms. Yatkin seeks what Isaiah Berlin refers to as an “awareness of the deep currents” – a comprehension of the connection between all things, an awareness of the present as well as that which transcends time and space..

First, she draws from the human body. “This lies at the core of our existence and it has done so since the birth of humanity, predating even speech as a means of expression.”

Second, Ms.Yatkin draws from history. She has drawn from Jose Limon, Donald McKayle, Eleo Pomare and danced in many modern dance classics during my professional dancing career like Kathrine Dunham, Talley Beatty, Donald McKayle, Merce Cunningham and Dianne McIntyre. She worked on reconstructing a solo entitled Terpsichore created by Barbara Gardner in 1973. Barbara Garder, who is a student of Mary Wigman, created this work as a homage to Mary Wigman upon her death in 1973. Through work she attempts “to not only create but preserve.

Third, drawing upon her background as a choreographer, Ms. Yatkin has brought together influences from a variety of places: specific geographic locales such as the Mediterranean, which brings together Africa, Asia and Europe (where her family comes from) and United States, which brings together individuals from all around the world. This led to working in a range of techniques/places/companies. For example, Dance Butter Tokyo was a dance theatre company combining Japanese Butoh with German Dance Theatre and Mark Headley fused Afro Caribbean with American Modern Dance. This also is expressed in diverse dance education. Rooted in American Modern dance – both modern as well as older forms, Ms. Yatkin simultaneously interested in dance traditions from around the world (e.g., Japanese Butoh Dance, Turkish Folkdance, Middle Eastern Dance and West African Dance).

Fourth, she draws on ancient myths but also upon modern theatre traditions, cinematic techniques, poetry as well as physical and psychological theories.

== Awards ==
Princess Grace Special Project Award from the Princess Grace Foundation in New York in 2009.

Princess Grace Choreography Fellowship from the Princess Grace Foundation in New York in 2008.

Metro DC Dance Award for “Outstanding Overall Production in a small venue” in 2006.

Metro DC Dance Award for “Outstanding Individual Dance” in 2006.

Dance Magazine's “Top 25 to Watch” in 2005.

D. C. Mayor's Arts Award for “Outstanding Emerging Artist” in 2004.

Metro DC Dance Award for “Outstanding Multi-Media” in 2004.

Metro DC Dance Award for “Outstanding Scenic Design” in 2003

Metro DC Dance Award for “Outstanding Individual Performer” in 2002.

Dance USA Scholarship to attend the Dance USA/National Roundtable in Miami, Florida. 2002

“Vaslav Nijinski Award” for Contemporary Choreography (Kiev, Ukraine).2002

Winner of the category “best female modern solo” at the Music World 2000 (in Fivizzano, Italy). 2000.

== Grants ==
- USAI grant from the Mid-Atlantic Arts Foundation for 2010.
- National Performance Network “Performing Americas Project” grant 2010.
- Artist Fellowship Grant” from the D.C. Commission on the Arts and Humanities and the National Endowment for the Arts. 2009.
- City Arts Grant” from the D.C. Commission on the Arts and Humanities and the National Endowment for the Arts. 2009.
- CAPA - Creative and Performing Arts Award” from the University of Maryland division of Research and Graduate Studies. 2008.
- City Arts Grant” from the D.C. Commission on the Arts and Humanities and the National Endowment for the Arts. 2006-7.
- International Travel Grant” from the College of Arts and Humanities, University of Maryland. 2006.
- Artist Fellowship Grant” from the D.C. Commission on the Arts and Humanities and the National Endowment for the Arts. 2005-2006.
- CAPA - Creative and Performing Arts Award” from the University of Maryland division of Research and Graduate Studies. 2005.
- City Arts Grant” from the D.C. Commission on the Arts and Humanities and the National Endowment for the Arts. 2004-5.
- National Performance Network Creation Fund grant co-commissioned by Dance Place, the Miami Dade Community College and Reston Arts Center. 2005
- Americas Project” travel grant from National Performance Network, Arts International and La Red. 2004.
- Artist Fellowship Grant” from the D.C. Commission on the Arts and Humanities and the National Endowment for the Arts. 2004.
- City Arts Grant” from the D.C. Commission on the Arts and Humanities. 2003.
- CAPA the Creative and Performing Arts Award” from the University of Maryland division of Research and Graduate Studies.2003
- Millennium Stage Local Dance Commissioning Project” from the John F. Kennedy Center in Washington, D.C. 2002.
- Young Emerging Artist Grant” from the D.C. Commission on the Arts and Humanities. 2002.
- International Travel Fund” from the Office of International Programs at the University of Maryland, College Park. 2001.
- Artist Fellowship Program Grant” from the D.C. Commission on the Arts and Humanities and the National Endowment for the Arts. 2001.
- Small Project Grant” from the D.C. Commission on the Arts and Humanities. 2001.
- Astral Career Grant” from the National Foundation for the Advancement in the Arts (NFAA). 2001.
