= Robert W. Parker (composer) =

American musician

Robert W. Parker (August 13, 1960 – April 13, 2020) was an American composer, organist, and percussionist based in Southern California. He is best known for his sacred music and compositions for concert band. He also wrote incidental music for the theater.

He began his career as a professional musician in his teens, playing organ for a small church meeting that met in a YMCA. He went on to earn a bachelor's degree from Yale College (1982), a master's degree from the Yale School of Music (1985), and a Doctor of Musical Arts degree from Claremont Graduate University (1996).

Parker's "Sicut Incipiat" ("thus, let it begin"), a commencement march for concert band, was the first work to be commissioned by the Robert J. Flanagan Yale Bands Commissioning Endowment, established in 2007. The composition was added to Yale's repertoire of commencement music beginning with the university's 307th commencement ceremony in May 2008. Parker's music has become part of another school's tradition: He composed the tune for "Ancora Imparo," the alma mater of Illinois Central College.

Parker has written sacred music for a number of Southern California churches, notably St. Andrew's Presbyterian Church in Newport Beach, where several of his orchestral works have premiered, and Oneonta Congregational Church in South Pasadena, with which he is affiliated as a composer and performer. He composed the anthem for the 2000 ordination of the Right Reverend J. Jon Bruno, sixth Episcopal Bishop of Los Angeles.

Minute-long compositions by Parker have been featured in the 2006 Pacific Rim and 2007 Munich Mix concerts that Vox Novus held as part of its ongoing 60x60 electroacoustic project. His theatrical compositions include music for the theater arts program at the California Institute of Technology and for the critically acclaimed Rude Guerrilla Theater Company in Santa Ana, California.

Parker was a teacher at (and an alumnus of) Flintridge Preparatory School in La Cañada Flintridge, California.

== Compositions ==
- "Elizabeth's Farewell" (2008)
- "Sicut Incipiat" (2008)
- "Fanfare and Cortège" (2007)
- "Psalm 57: For Ground Zero" (2006)
- Mass of Peace (2005)
- "A Promise of Comfort: For London, July 7, 2005" (2005)
- "Behold My Servant: Commemorating the Installation of Right Reverend J. Jon Bruno" (2000)

== Awards ==
2008: Robert J. Flanagan Yale Bands Endowment Commission
