= Aaron Krister Johnson =

American classical composer

Aaron Krister Johnson is a Chicago-based composer, musician, and teacher. His experience ranges from the Western classical keyboard tradition, to folk music, and to modern electro-acoustic free improvisation. The Chicago Sun-Times called his composition "evocative", and his improvisations have been hailed by Keyboard Magazine as "challenging and creative". His work has appeared on National Public Radio, and has been lauded by Chicagocritic.com, the Chicago Tribune, the Windy City Times, and the online music journal Tokafi.com

Johnson is founder and artistic director of UnTwelve, a group dedicated to writing music written in alternative tunings. Through the UnTwelve organization Aaron Krister Johnson collaborated with 60x60 as a music director or "macro-composer" to create the 60x60 UnTwelve mix contain 60 one-minute works with a theme of microtonality.

He has worked in the area of composition of incidental music and sound design for theatre. His score for Peer Gynt was nominated for a 2005 Joseph Jefferson award for outstanding original incidental music for a play. Other theatre music and sound design credits include Madwoman of Chaillot and the Jeff-nominated Natural Affection for the Artistic Home, and Lakeside Shakespeare of Michigan's productions of Twelfth Night and Julius Caesar.

Johnson originally received his education at the Manhattan School of Music Preparatory division, the State University of New York at Purchase (BFA Magna Cum Laude) and Northwestern University (MFA Magna Cum Laude) for his graduate studies.
