= Cornelius Carter =

American dancer, choreographer and professor

Cornelius Carter is a dancer, choreographer, and professor emeritus of dance. He is the director of dance at the University of Alabama and also the artistic director of Transition into Performance (TiP) and of the Alabama Repertory Dance Theatre.

== Biography ==
Carter was born in Greenville, Mississippi. He won a scholarship to The Conservatory of Theatre Arts at Webster University in St. Louis, Missouri, after high school. He received his M.F.A. in Dance from the University of Hawaii at Manoa, and joined the Cleo Parker Robinson Dance Ensemble and studied at The Ailey School on scholarship.

His first major appointment was as the new artistic director for one of the first contemporary dance companies and schools in Reykjavík, Iceland. He has been a faculty member at the University of Alabama since 1992 and was tenured in 1998. Carter has been a faculty member at the American Ballet Theatre, American Dance Festival (Moscow 1997 and Korea 2002), Bates Dance Festival, and Harvard Summer Dance Festival.

== Accolades ==
In 2001, Carter was named "Professor of the Year" by the Carnegie Foundation for the Advancement of Teaching and the Council for Advancement and Support of Education, the first dance teacher in over a decade to receive that honor. Carter was also awarded the 2001-2002 Outstanding Commitment to Teaching Award by the Alabama Alumni Association.

He was most recently Guest Rehearsal Director for Dance Brazil 2005 Season in Bahia, Brazil, and teaches and choreographs for the Alvin Ailey Summer Intensive Program (2001–present) in New York City.
