= Eldad Tsabary =

Eldad Tsabary (Hebrew: אלדד צברי; born 1969, Israel) is a composer living in Montreal. He composes and performs in a variety of styles including contemporary, experimental, acousmatic, sound art, and live electronics. His works, in all styles, are created with wide textural and timbral variety and attention to motion and process.

Dr. Tsabary is a professor of electroacoustic music at Concordia University, Montreal, where he teaches electroacoustic ear training, composition, modular programming, history, and live electronics. He also taught sound recording, digital audio, MIDI, synthesis, sampling, and sound for image at Formation Formation Musitechnic, Montreal.

He is the founder and director of Concordia Laptop Orchestra (CLOrk), which specializes in networked and multidisciplinary performances. Under Tsabary's direction, CLOrk has performed (physically and telematically) with symphonic, jazz, chamber, and laptop orchestras worldwide and collaborated with dancers and video artists. CLOrk's sound is characterized by wide textural and dynamic ranges and rich, glitchy rhythms. The orchestra consists of 15-25 performers and is guided by soundpainting conduction.

Tsabary's works have been performed by the Bulgarian Philharmonic, Cygnus Ensemble, Hagai Rehavia, and Haim Avitsur as well as by himself and were presented in venues and festivals such as Carnegie Hall, CCRMA, and the Burning Man festival among many others. His music is published by Editions BIM (Switzerland) and released on ERMMedia, Capstone Records, New Adventures in Sound Art, JAZZIS, The Infinite Sector, comfortstand.com, Vox Novus and SoundLab Channel. His compositions have been awarded several international prizes.

Tsabary's one-minute works have been selected for the 60x60 project in 2003, 2004, 2006, 2007, 2008, and 2010. In 2008, the 60x60 Canada mix was started with Vox Novus's 60x60 creator and co-producer Robert Voisey and Eldad Tsabary as the macro-composer/music coordinator and co-producer; the 60x60 Canada mix contains works from composers from and currently living in Canada. Two Canadian mixes were created in 2008: a concert version which was premiered at Concordia University as part of the ÉuCuE performance series and a "SONUS Gallery" mix that was published in the CEC's (Canadian Electroacoustic Community) electronic journal of electroacoustics, eContact!

== Interviews & Press ==
Interview with Eldad Tsabary on Sound L A B

== Discography ==
- 60x60 (2004–2005) Vox Novus VN-001
- 60x60 (2003) Capstone Records CPS-8744

=== Solo recordings ===
- 2005 - Psychotropic Volume One (Infinite Sector Recordings)
