= Monique Buzzarté =

American classical composer

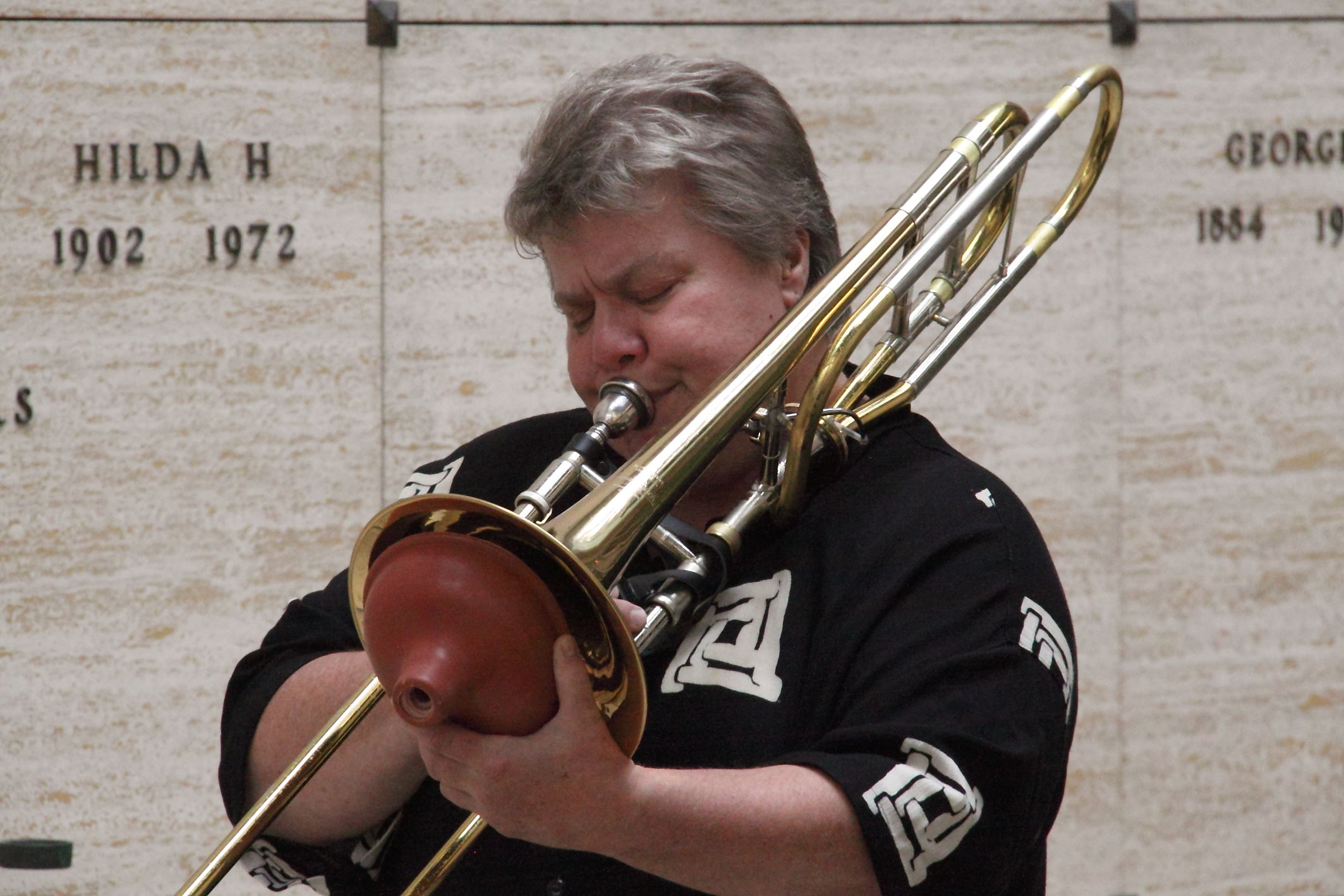
- Buzzarte at the 2012 Garden of Memory concert in Oakland
- Born: August 26, 1960 (age 65); San Pedro, California
- Education: University of Washington, Manhattan School of Music.
- Occupation: musician
- Known for: leading protest over discrimination in the Vienna Philharmonic

Monique Buzzarté (born 1960 in San Pedro, California, United States on August 26, 1960) is a composer, trombonist, and activist was a key part of an international protest on behalf of the International Alliance for Women in Music (IAWM) against discrimination based on gender by the Vienna Philharmonic. The protests lead to the admission of women as members of the Vienna Philharmonic in 1997. The orchestra announced that harpist Anna Lelkes had been admitted as the first female member of the orchestra. Lelkes had been playing with the orchestra for twenty years but she had been denied membership due to her gender.

Buzzarté's research interests include finding compositions for brass instruments by women composers.

Buzzarté studied with Stuart Dempster and Ned Meredith, and is certified to teach Pauline Oliveros's deep listening practices. She holds a BA and BMus from the University of Washington and a MMus from the Manhattan School of Music.

Monique Buzzarté was the editor (with Tom Bickley) of the Anthology of Essays on Deep Listening published in 2012.

== Discography ==
- Sleeping Awake Music of Noah Creshevsky (2019, Open Space 37)
- E (and sometimes, why) If, Bwana with/and/by Trio Scordatura (2012, Pogus 21062-2)
- 16 LIVE/CICADA #3 If, Bwana (2011, Bastet's Kitten BK001)
- "Assemble. Age" If, Bwana (2010, Mutable Music 17540-2)
- Keep Going: The Music of Elias Tanenbaum Ensemble π on "A Bubble in My Eye" (2010, Ravello Records RAEL 7807)
- Fluctuations with Ellen Fullman (2007, Deep Listening 38)
- Noah Creshevsky: To Know and Not to Know (2007, Tzadik 8036)
- Holding Patterns - Zanana (2004, Deep Listening 30)
- Wake Up and Dream - New Circle Five (2003, Deep Listening 20)
- John Cage: The Number Pieces 2 - Arditti Quartart (1991, Mode 75)
