= WOBC-FM =

Radio station at Oberlin College

Oberlin, Ohio; United States
- Broadcast area: Lorain County; Greater Cleveland (limited)
- Frequency: 91.5 MHz
- Branding: WOBC 91.5 FM

Programming
- Format: Freeform

Ownership
- Owner: Oberlin College

History
- Founded: November 5, 1950
- First air date: 1961
- Call sign meaning: "Oberlin College"

Technical information
- Licensing authority: FCC
- Facility ID: 49954
- Class: A
- ERP: 1000 watts
- HAAT: 41 meters (135 ft)
- Transmitter coordinates: 41.294°N 82.222°W

Links
- Public license information: Public file; LMS
- Webcast: Listen live
- Website: www.wobcfm.org

WOBC-FM (91.5 FM) is a non-commercial educational radio station licensed to serve Oberlin, Ohio, carrying a mixed freeform and community format. Owned by Oberlin College, the station services Lorain County and western parts of Greater Cleveland. The WOBC-FM studios and transmitter are located on the Oberlin College campus at Wilder Hall. In addition to a standard analog transmission, WOBC-FM is available online.

WOBC broadcasts more than 150 programs weekly, each conceived by volunteer hosts and DJs. The shows are then chosen by the democratically elected station board. WOBC airs an eclectic mix of music and public affairs programming including new and old pop music, punk, folk, classical, blues, R&B, metal, hip-hop, jazz, electronic, radio dramas, talk shows, and news including the independently syndicated news program Democracy Now!. The station is currently run by Station Manager Ilan Kahanov, Operations Manager Seiami Kim-Amoda, Student Engineer Beck Robertson, Music Director Clara Mead, Program Director Daniel Chian, and Communications Director Walker Prince.

== History ==
A radio station at Oberlin College was first established in 1949 as KOCN, the Oberlin College Student Network, which made its first broadcast November 5, 1950, at 590-AM. The first broadcast originated from a building located at 32 East College Street that was later demolished to allow the construction of the Oberlin Inn. When construction of the Inn began in the mid-1950s, the radio station moved to the garage behind Grey Gables, a building on West College Street that was later demolished to construct the Mudd Center. The station's call letters changed from KOCN to WOBC in the early 1950s to comply with new call-letter standards.

During this early period, studio equipment and broadcast electronics were built by Oberlin College students, save the purchase of used turntables and microphones. The AM signal was broadcast directly to dormitories over a network of wire and transmission boxes attached to electrical poles in town. In 1953, the station acquired a Teletype machine as a result of a sponsorship deal with Lucky Strike which provided news updates. During the first two decades of the station's operation, programming consisted largely of classical music, news, jazz and popular music. The station is notable in recent years for efforts to reach out beyond the Oberlin College student body that makes up the majority of volunteer DJs and listener to the wider Lorain County community.

WOBC began broadcasting at 88.7-FM in 1961. The studio remained at the garage behind Grey Gables until 1964 when the station moved to its current location in Wilder Hall. During the extensive remodeling of Wilder Hall during the summer of 2025, the third floor of the building partially collapsed, rendering the station unusable. As of October 2025, the studio is officially operating out of a basement room in Peters Hall. It now broadcasts on 91.5-FM and through webcast.
