= Alicia Walsh =

Australian cricketer

Alicia Walsh (14 February 1911 in Hunters Hill, New South Wales – 4 May 1984 in Mosman, New South Wales) was an Australian cricket player. Walsh played three test matches for the Australia national women's cricket team.
