= Shimpei Takeda =

Shimpei Takeda (born in Japan) is a visual artist and filmmaker who has lived and worked in New York City since 2002. While primarily working with photographic material, he has also collaborated with composers and sound artists through his video works. His video work has been shown internationally, including Essl Collection of Contemporary Art, Weisman Art Museum, and Austin Museum of Art.

After the Fukushima Daiichi nuclear disaster occurred within 40 miles to where his family resides, Takeda started his on-going project Trace – cameraless records of radioactive contamination: Radiation in the contaminated soil exposes photographic materials as direct and physical documentation of the disaster.
