= Robert Fleisher =

American classical composer

Robert Jay Fleisher (born 1953, New York City) is a composer, the author of Twenty Israeli Composers, and a contributor to Theresa Sauer's Notations 21. He is professor emeritus at Northern Illinois University, where he long served as Coordinator of the Music Theory and Composition area.

== Education ==
Fleisher received his baccalaureate degree in Music Theory and Composition at the University of Colorado. He earned his M.M. and D.M.A. Composition degrees at the University of Illinois, studying with Ben Johnston and Salvatore Martirano.

== Reception ==
Fleisher's solo and chamber music has been called “eloquent,” “lovely and emotional," “ingenious,” and praised for its “astoundingly attractive vertical sonorities.” A review of the CD Portraits (Capstone, 2008) featuring soprano Lynn Eustis, baritone Robert Best, and pianist Elvia Puccinelli, notes that his Five Songs from Carl Sandburg's "Prairie" for soprano and piano "are particularly apt in how they embody the spirit of the texts so convincingly, with an openness that never feels empty." Fleisher's electroacoustic works have been described as “fascinating,” “endearingly low-tech,” and possessing “a rich, tactile texture.”

Some of his earlier works employing untraditional music notation have been exhibited in the United States, including Sylvia Smith's “Scribing Sound” exhibitions at the 1984 (Hartford, CT) and 1986 (Houston, TX) New Music America festivals, as well as in France and the Netherlands (2012) in connection with Theresa Sauer's book, Notations 21. Fleisher is represented in that collection (inspired by John Cage's 1965 Notations) by both a score sample and his invited essay, "Being of Sound (and Visual) Mind," which is highlighted in a New Music Connoisseur review.

== Discography ==
- Parallel (fixed media); Electronic Masters Vol. 11 (Ablaze, 2026).
- Six Little Piano Pieces (William Koehler, piano), Oxib' (Space Bear, 2026).
- Minims for Max (Max Lifchitz, piano), Piano Crosscurrents (North/South, 2025).
- Dans le Piano (fixed media), WIIB' (Space Bear, 2025).
- Parallel (fixed media), JUN (SkyDeck, 2024).
- Producer, Composing Israel Works by Avni, Ben-Haim, Ben-Shabetai, Ehrlich, Fleischer, Maayani, Olivero, Shapira, Zehavi (Neuma, 2023).
- Altro Alfresco (fixed media), Five Pieces for Flute and Percussion, Loretto Alfresco (fixed media); ILTA (Neuma, 2022).
- 32 Bars for string quartet, SQ ÉxQuartet (Phasma-Music, 2022).
- Dans le piano (fixed media); Music by Living Composers, Series 1, Vol. 7; (Petrichor, 2021).
- Dumkyana; Moto Finale Trio Casals (Navona, 2021); Silver Medal, http://www.globalmusicawards.com/.
- Gig Harbor, Six Little Piano Pieces (Martin Jones, piano); American Piano Music Series, Vol. 5 (Pnova, 2019).
- Maniondala (Gregory Beyer, malletKAT); University of Illinois Percussion Ensemble, William Moersch, director; Long Roll (Albany, 2017).
- Beginning; Ending (Iwona Glinka, flute), One Minute (Sarton, 2017).
- Ma mère (Ovidiu Marinescu, cello), Moto Continuo (Navona, 2015).
- Loretto Alfresco (fixed media), Electro-Acoustic Miniatures 2012: Re-Caged (SEAMUS, 2013).
- Five Songs from Carl Sandburg's "Prairie" (Lynn Eustis, sop; Elvia Puccinelli, piano);Portraits: Songs for Soprano, Baritone and Piano ; Performers Recording Series, Society of Composers, Inc. (Capstone, 2008).
- Secrets (Tomoko Deguchi, piano); Syncopated Lady (Capstone, 1999).
- Two Movements for Violoncello (Elizabeth Morrow, cello); Soliloquy (Centaur, 1999).

== Publications ==
- Fleisher, Robert (1997). Twenty Israeli Composers: Voices of a Culture. Wayne State University Press. ISBN 9780814326480.
