= Richard Arnest =

American composer and performer

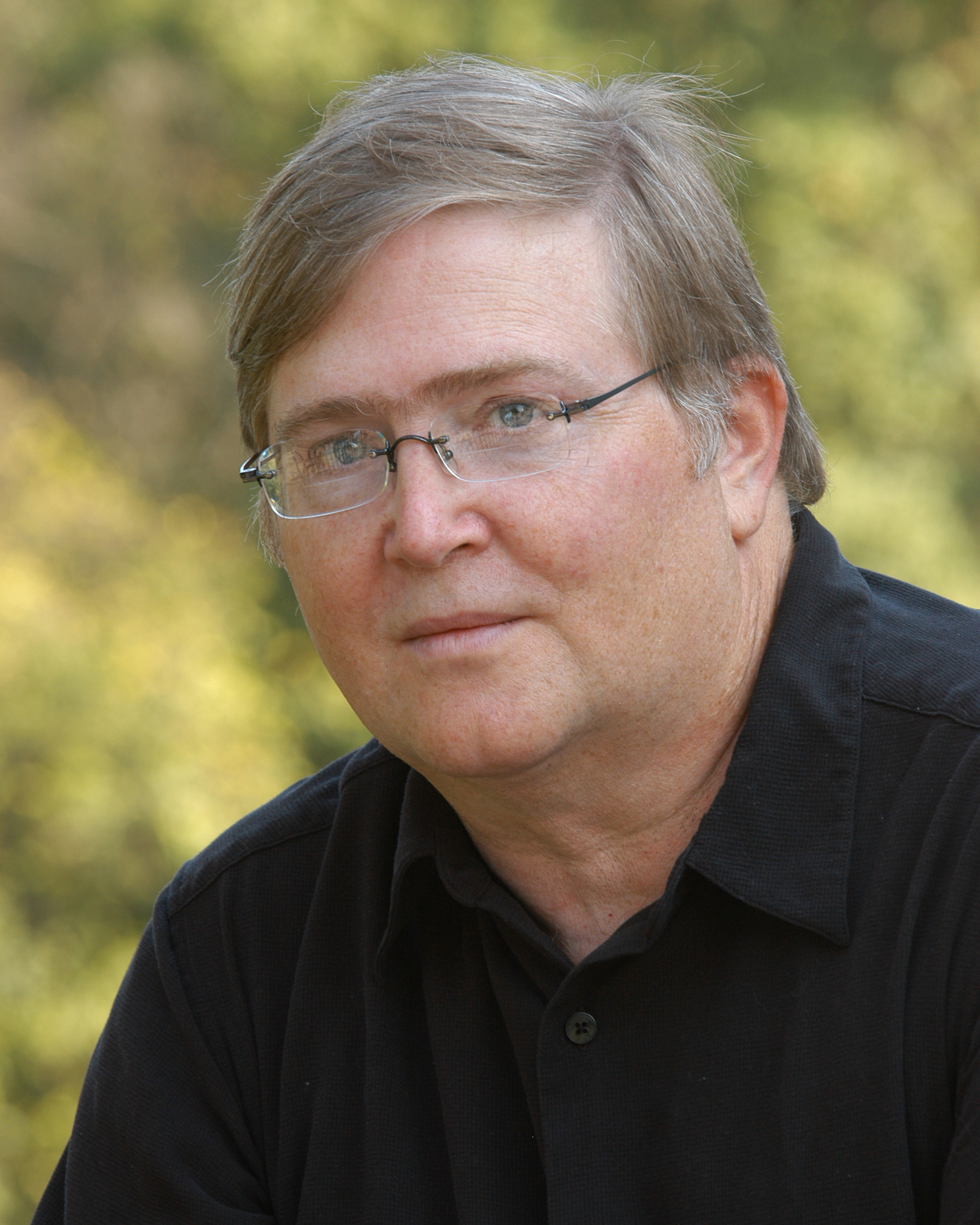
Richard Arnest

Richard Arnest (born 1950) is an American composer and performer.

== Early life and education ==
Arnest received degrees in music composition from the University of Hawaiʻi at Mānoa in 1972 and the University of Cincinnati College-Conservatory of Music in 1986. While pursuing his degrees, he composed and performed.

== Career ==
Arnest is a flutist. In the early 1970s, he performed with the Hawaii Performing Arts Company, where he was the first music director. In the mid 1970s, he toured as a member of Aulacord Duo under the Mid-America Arts Alliance. He was the artist-in-residence for the Ohio Arts Council, the Arkansas Arts Council, and the State Arts Council of Oklahoma. In 1980, he was a fellow with the National Endowment for the Arts.

He wrote the music "Children of Light" for "Star Stuff" planetarium show at the Planetarium of the Cincinnati Museum of Natural History. Flute World selected him as Featured Composer in 2006.

Arnest has also created programs for the Arkansas Educational Television Network. He was a teacher at the Arkansas Governor's School.

== Selected works ==
- A Chiu
- An English Christmas
- Apotheose du Roi
- Beata Es
- Chiese Serenissime
- Haworth Suite
- Jacob's Ladder
- Liquescence

== Awards ==
- EPICmusic, 2004
- ASCAPlus Award, 2005–07
