= Joseph Ryan Harrington =

American actor, dancer, and singer (born 1999)

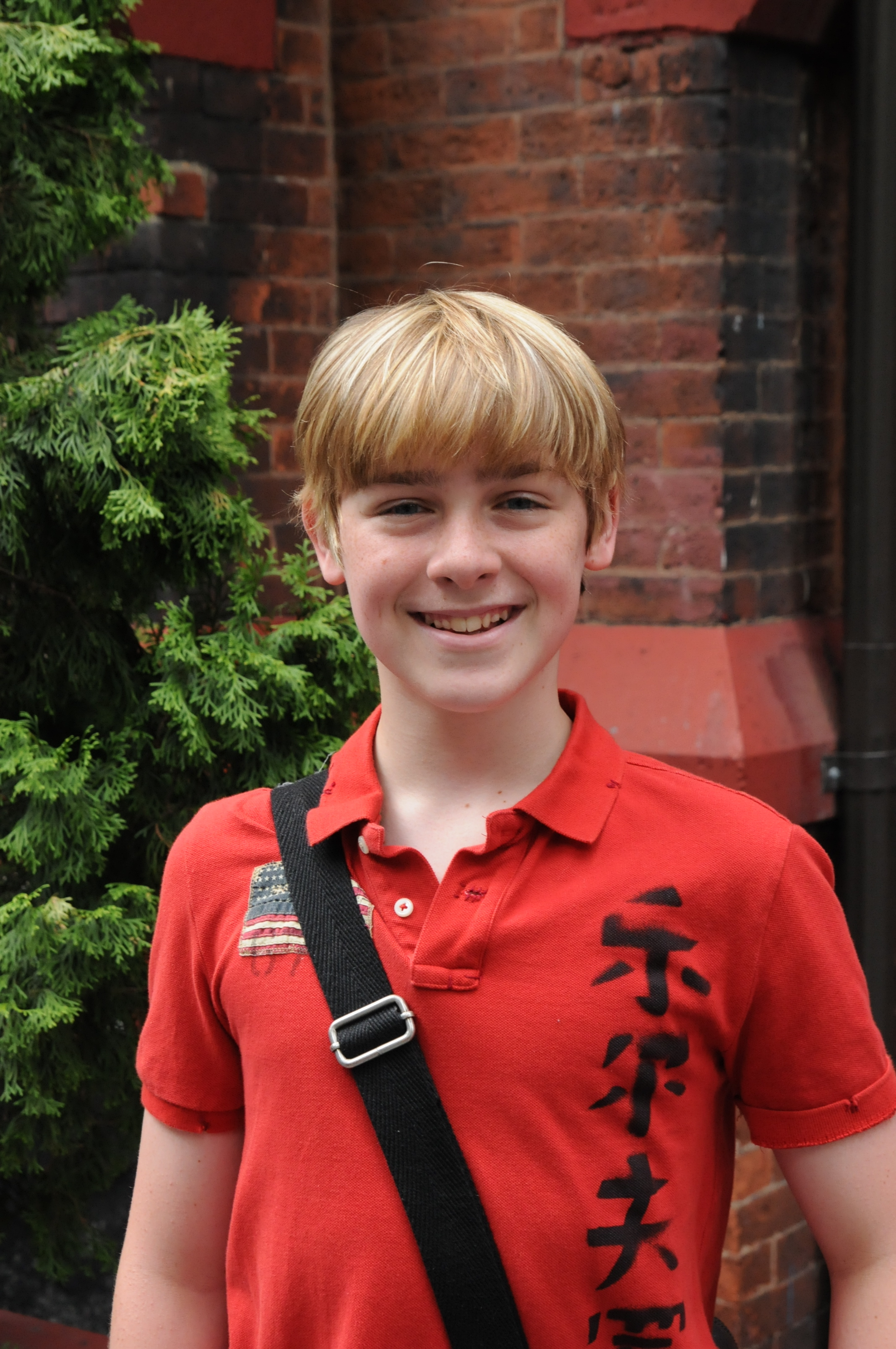
- Born: Joseph Ryan Harrington; February 19, 1999 (age 27); Cincinnati, Ohio
- Years active: 2005–present

Joseph Ryan Harrington (born February 19, 1999) is an American actor, dancer, and singer currently residing in Cincinnati, Ohio.

== Career ==
Harrington began his career on stage in 2005 with the Cincinnati Ballet. There he performed in The Nutcracker in 2005 and portrayed Michael Darling in Peter Pan for the 2008–2009 season.

The Broadway debut for Harrington came in November 2007 with the revival of How the Grinch Stole Christmas!. The production was able to re-open, after closing for two weeks in November, despite the stagehands' strike. The show was able to reopen due to its limited holiday run.

For nearly a year, Harrington participated in what was referred to as "Billy Camp." On June 10, 2010, Harrington was cast in the Broadway production of Billy Elliot the Musical. On October 24 of that year, he made his debut in the titular role at the Imperial Theatre as the twelfth actor to play Billy in the Broadway production. He continued the role until the show closed on January 8, 2012.

=== Stage ===
Date	Production	Role	Theatre
October 2 to November 2, 2014	The Tempest	Ariel	La MaMa Experimental Theatre Club (New York City, NY, USA)
July 9, 2012 – July 29, 2012	How Deep Is The Ocean?	Kid	The Theater at St. Clements (New York City, NY, USA)
October 24, 2010 – January 8, 2012	Billy Elliot the Musical	Billy	Imperial Theatre (Broadway)
November 24, 2008 – December 27, 2008	Radio City Christmas Spectacular	Young Boy	Grand Ole Opry
November 9, 2007 – January 6, 2008	How the Grinch Stole Christmas!	Little Who	St. James Theatre (Broadway)
2008–2009	Peter Pan	Michael Darling	Cincinnati Ballet
2005	The Nutcracker		Cincinnati Ballet

=== Film ===
Year	Title	Role	Notes
2012	Contest	Otto	
2010	The Boy Ballet Dancer	Himself	with Finis Jhung

=== Television ===
Year	Title	Role	Notes
2010	Mega Music Fest	Dancer	Nickelodeon
