= Dance Parade =

Dance organization based in New York City

- Formation: December 2006; 19 years ago
- Founder: Greg Miller
- Founded at: New York City, U.S.
- Type: Nonprofit
- Services: Annual street parade and festival; workshops and residencies for schools, community groups, and senior centers
- Fields: Dance promotion, education, and community festival
- Board of directors: Mahayana Landowne; Trevor Hochman; Greg Miller
- Key people: Greg Miller (founder)

Dance Parade is U.S.–based non-profit organization that promotes dance as an expressive and unifying art form by showcasing all forms of dance.

It produces an annual street parade and festival in New York City held on the third Saturday of May. Through its education programming, the organization provides workshops and residencies to schools, community groups and senior centers.

== Establishment and first parade ==
Greg Miller, a social entrepreneur and dance aficionado, established the non-profit organization in December 2006 and led an all-volunteer group that produced the inaugural parade on May 19, 2007. Over 2,300 dancers from seventy-five organizations made their way down Manhattan's Broadway and Fifth Avenue on and around eight floats. Ending in front of the Washington Square Arch in Greenwich Village's Washington Square Park, the parade culminated in thirty-one performances highlighting native New York dance styles, including hip-hop, jazz dance, break dancing, and salsa. Participants included the original B-boys, Keith and Kevin Smith; DJs Danny Tenaglia and Kool Herc; and Frieda Williams.

As defined by its board of directors (Mahayana Landowne, Trevor Hochman and Greg Miller), Dance Parade's mission is "to promote dance as an expressive and unifying art form by showcasing all forms of dance, educating the general public about the opportunities to experience dance, and celebrating diversity of dance in New York City by sponsoring a yearly city-wide dance parade and dance festival".

== Subsequent parades ==
In 2008, with Washington Square Park under renovation, the parade terminated in Manhattan's Tompkins Square Park in the East Village. With the support of then–New York State governor David Paterson and then–New York City mayor Michael Bloomberg, the second annual Dance Parade drew 108 organizations representing thirty-one styles of dance, ten floats, and over 4,000 dancers. Jazz dancer Luigi was the grand marshal, accompanied by Miss Dance USA, the New York Knicks City Dancers, as well as ballerinas, salseros, and club kids. Thirty-nine performances took place on stage in the park, and workshops gave the public the chance to learn dance.

The 2010 Dance Parade took place on Saturday, May 22. The parade featured swing dancing, samba, tango, pole dancers and more.

== Honorary grand marshals ==
Honorary grand marshals who have appeared at Dance Parade Garth Fagan, Kwikstep, Rokafella, Carmen de Lavallade, Robert Battle, Mary Verdi-Fletcher, Rekha Malhotra, Savion Glover, Jawolle Willa Jo Zollar, Hex Hector, Jacqulyn Buglisi, Baba Chuck Davis, Louie Vega, Ashley Tuttle, Elisa Monte, Bill Shannon, Trevor Hochman, Peter Zehren, Samir Bitar, Mel Alvarez, Jonathan Peters, Charles Reinhart, "Billy Elliot" (Joseph Ryan Harrington), Kat Wildish, Amy Marshall, Jellybean Benitez, Elizabeth Zimmer, Ellenore Scott, Don Campbell "Campbellock", Morocco (Carolina Varga Dinicu), Luis Salgado, Luigi, Kool Herc, Danny Tenaglia, and Djoniba Mouflet.
