= David Evan Jones (composer) =

American musician

David Evan Jones (born 1946) is an American pianist and composer of chamber music, opera, and computer music.

Jones was a student of composers Roger Reynolds and Pauline Oliveros at University of California, San Diego. After serving as Composer-in-Residence at York University (England), he joined the faculty at Dartmouth College, New Hampshire in the 1980s before becoming professor of music at University of California, Santa Cruz. Jones has composed in residence at IRCAM in Paris, Elektronmusikstudion (EMS) in Stockholm, and at Bregman Electronic Music Studio at Dartmouth College where he co-founded, with Jon Appleton, the Dartmouth graduate program in Electro-Acoustic Music.

== Works ==
Jones has written articles and created compositions that explore structural relationships between music and phonetics. These include compositions such as Pashanti—The Nine Billion Names of God, Scritto, Still Life in Wood and Metal, Still Life Dancing, and the five pieces featured on Centaur Records CRC3500 entitled News from Afar. He has also written libretti and music for two chamber operas. Bardos, the most prominent of these, had its professional premier in 2004 in Hoam Hall, Seoul, Korea.

Jones also composes for Korean instruments. Most notably, his Dreams of Falling, a composition for the Creative Orchestra of Korea’s National Gugak Center, received a half dozen performances in the United States and Seoul over the course of four years 2016-2019.

In recent years, Jones has further developed his use of algorithmic processes in a series of pieces composed for Disklavier (computer-controlled piano) combined with traditional instruments.

Most of Jones' scores are available through American Composers Alliance.

== Discography ==
- Fast & Odd: Neo-Balkan Jazz and Concert Music. Centaur CRC2655
- From Sofia to Seoul. New Chamber Music Composed & Directed by David Evan Jones. Centaur CRC3006
- News from Afar. For chamber ensembles with news broadcasts transformed. Centaur CRC3500
- Individual compositions by David Evan Jones are available on compact disks from Wergo Records, Centaur Records, Contemporary Recording Studios, Musical Heritage Society, and Capstone Records.

== Selected Journal Articles ==
- Jones, David Evan. "Compositional Control of Phonetic/Nonphonetic Perception," Perspectives of New Music, Vol. 25:1 & 2, pp. 138–155 (winter, summer 1987)
- Jones, David Evan. "Speech Extrapolated," Perspectives of New Music, Volume 28:1, pp. 112–142 (winter 1990)
- Jones, David Evan. "A Computational Composer's Assistant for Atonal Counterpoint," Computer Music Journal, M.I.T Press, winter 2001, pp. 33–43

== Honors and awards ==
David Evan Jones' compositions have been honored by first prize awards in the Premio Ancona International Composition Competition (Italy), the national competition of the American New Music Consortium, and the MACRO International Composition Competition. His work has also received Honorable Mentions from the Prix Ars Electronica (Austria) and the Bourges Electro-Acoustic Music Competition (France).
