= The Sheldon =

Concert hall and art galleries in St. Louis, Missouri

Coordinates: 38.6397°N 90.2333°W

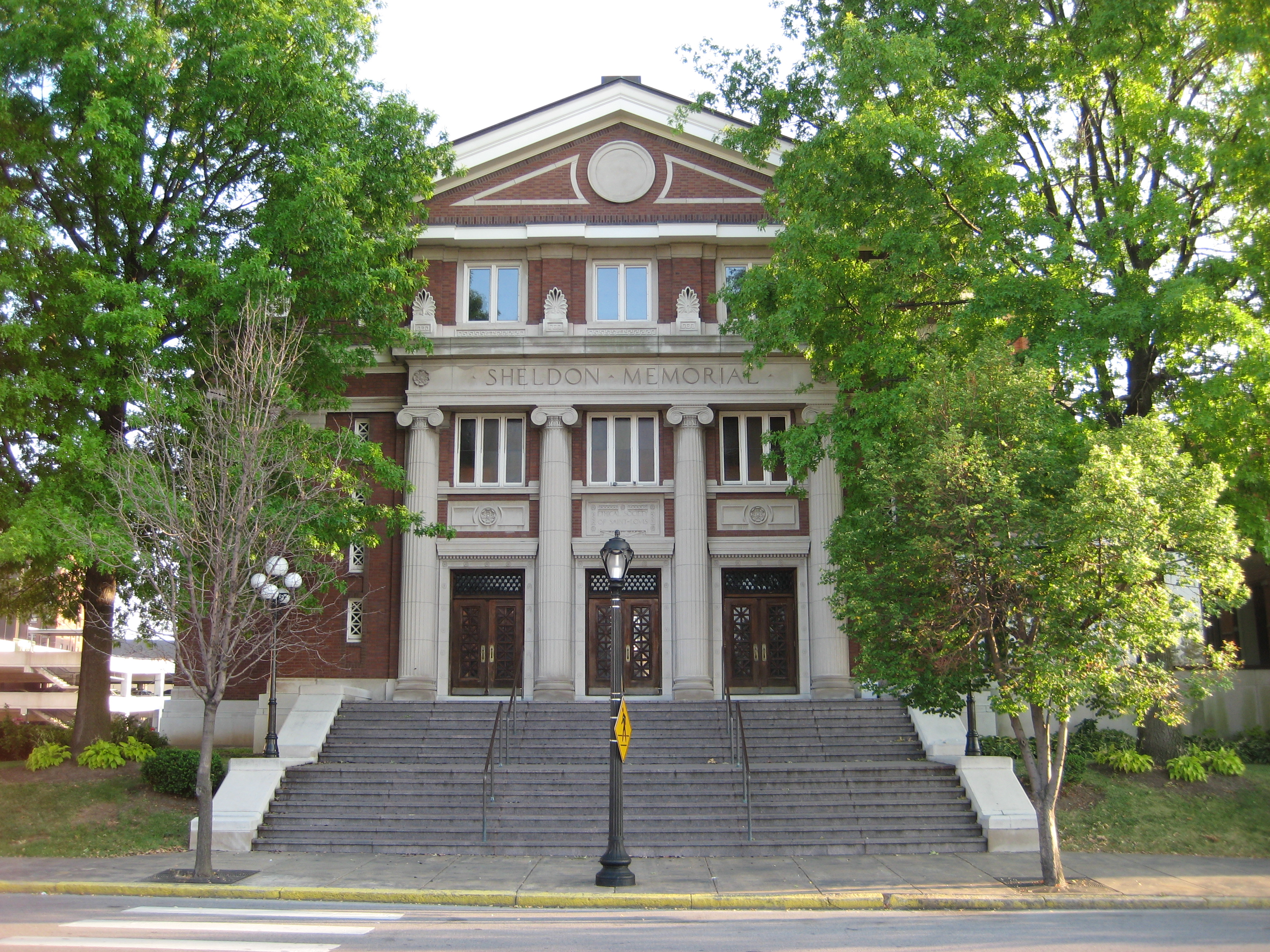
The Sheldon concert hall

The Sheldon, designed by the noted 1904 World’s Fair architect Louis C. Spiering, was built in 1912 as the home of the Ethical Society of St. Louis. Musicians and public speakers throughout the years have enjoyed the perfect acoustics of The Sheldon Concert Hall, earning The Sheldon its reputation as "The Carnegie Hall of St. Louis." Well-known singers and ensembles have performed at The Sheldon, and speakers such as Margaret Mead, Thurgood Marshall and Martha Gellhorn have spoken from its stage. The St. Louis Chapter of the League of Women Voters was founded in The Sheldon’s Green Room.

When the Ethical Society relocated to St. Louis County in 1964, The Sheldon primarily became a music venue. Then, in 1974, a former singer with the Duke Ellington Orchestra purchased the facility, transforming The Sheldon into a church and the site for many glorious jazz and gospel concerts. A California attorney with a love for chamber music purchased the building in 1984 at the urging of the Paganini String Quartet. He began operating The Sheldon in 1986 as a venue for concerts and community events. At risk of being demolished in the mid-80s to make way for a parking lot, a group of community leaders and Ethical Society members launched the “Save Our Sheldon” campaign, which culminated in a movie production entitled Sweet Sheldon, and starring Burt Lancaster. Public sentiment, and the recognition of The Sheldon as a cultural landmark, turned the tide and the building was saved.

Determined to preserve and establish The Sheldon as one of St. Louis’ greatest cultural resources, the non-profit Sheldon Arts Foundation was formed in 1989 by Walter F. Gunn. The Foundation purchased the building in 1991, and today The Sheldon Arts Foundation is governed by a 50-member Board of Directors. The Sheldon Concert Hall is the site of over 350 events each year, including great jazz, folk and classical music, featuring the world’s finest musicians. Artists such as Dave Brubeck, Diana Krall, José Carreras, Herbie Hancock, Doc Watson, Joan Baez, Willie Nelson, Lyle Lovett, B.B. King, Wynton Marsalis, Judy Collins, Renée Fleming and many more have performed at The Sheldon. In addition, The Sheldon presents Matinee Concerts, educational programs for schools and Coffee Concerts. The "Notes From Home" series, featuring St. Louis musicians, is presented weekday evenings. The Sheldon Ballroom, Spiering Room and Art Galleries host workshops and master classes, post-concert receptions, weddings, fundraising events, corporate presentations and community meetings.

In 1998, The Sheldon expanded its artistic focus to include five new art galleries in a $5 million dollar expansion project. Improvements included complete wheelchair accessibility, new restrooms, two new lobbies, a sculpture garden, added parking and in 1999, the 500-seat Louis Spiering Room. The art galleries encompass 6,000 square feet and feature exhibits on jazz history, photography, architecture, St. Louis artists and children’s art. The Sheldon's renovations continued in 2001 with the installation of five new stained glass windows designed by artist Rodney Winfield. His designs, called "Theme and Variation," are designed to be enjoyed both during the day and at night. The overall project is a tribute to Father Maurice McNamee, S.J.

In the heart of St. Louis’ Grand Center arts district, The Sheldon continues to offer the St. Louis area a wealth of cultural resources in the tradition of its visionary founders. A non-profit organization, The Sheldon relies on public support to carry out its mission: to preserve and operate the historic Sheldon Concert Hall and Art Galleries as an independent cultural institution, to produce and present events of both local and national importance, and to provide facilities and services for a wide variety of cultural, educational, artistic and community organizations.

In 2019, Steward Family Plaza, encompassing a walk way and vertical garden on the west side of The Sheldon, opens. The Sheldon presents over 350 events each year in the concert hall, art galleries, Ballroom and Konneker Room.

The Sheldon is located in the Grand Center arts district of St. Louis.

An annual summertime tradition at The Sheldon is "Golf the Galleries", featuring a fully-playable mini golf course with nine holes designed and installed by local artists and architects. The course is completely new every year.

== Sheldon Art Galleries ==
The Sheldon Art Galleries encompass 7,000 square feet (650 m^{2}) and feature exhibits on photography, architecture, St. Louis artists and collection, music history, emerging artists and children's art. Seasonally changing exhibitions are held each year.
