= Composer's Voice Concert Series =

Concert series in New York City

The Composer's Voice Concert Series is a concert series in New York City which presents contemporary chamber music. The series is produced by Vox Novus and was founded in 2001 by the composer Robert Voisey. Currently directed by Voisey, Composer's Voice holds concerts at The Firehouse Space on the third Thursday of every month. John de Clef Pineiro, in New Music Connoisseur, wrote, "[Vox Novus offers] the presentation of serious works by established and emerging composers. Those voices should be heard, and they can even be reheard on the Vox Novus website that generously offers complete audio recordings and even full scores of works presented by Vox Novus at its concerts."

Called "One of the premier showcases for promising composers" by Time Out New York, Composer's Voice is a venue for composers to have their work heard and to collaborate with other composers, musicians and artists.

Composer’s Voice concerts are always contradistinct, each necessarily presenting a different set of composers, forces and styles. Where they do not differ is in that the concerts are presented with intelligence and invention. This approach towards curating a concert is truly refreshing, fulfilling expectations but also offering the unexpected, suffusing the evening with both the light and the dark, the lean and the dense, deep ideas and straight-up fun.

— David Mecionis, SoundWordSight

In the article "Composer's Voice is fresh!", Brant Lyon describes a performance at Composer's Voice by the composer and performer Gelsey Bell "...like putting one's ear to the ground to hear what's coming in the distance or snuggling the side of your head against a pregnant woman's belly —except in reverse — for the dissipation, not anticipation. The sounds of her voice resonating with the piano's had the opposite effect in me: to inspire movement forward. I was hearing something new."

The Composer's Voice Concert Series has featured the works of hundreds of composers. Notable composers featured include: Annea Lockwood, Augusta Read Thomas, Liana Alexandra, Dennis Bathory-Kitsz, Eve Beglarian, George Brunner, Noah Creshevsky, Emma Lou Diemer, Moritz Eggert, Daniel Goode, Peri Mauer, Mike McFerron, Christian McLeer, David Morneau, Marco Oppedisano, Faye-Ellen Silverman, Allen Strange, Robert Voisey, and Rodney Waschka II.

The series highlights performers who champion the work of living composers. Notable performers include Robert Dick, Shiau-uen Ding, Oren Fader, Beth Griffith, Monica Harte, Craig Hultgren, Eva Ingolf, Face the Music, Conway Kuo, Margaret Lancaster, Agueda Pages, Patrica Strange, West Point Woodwind Quintet, and Sophia Yan.

Composer's Voice holds several annual concert celebrating themes. Composer's Voice 5th Annual Guitar Concert featured the guitarists Alturas Duo, Dan Cooper, Oren Fader and William Anderson playing the tiple. Composer's Voice also has an annual Japanese themed concert, an all-women concert celebrated in March for Women's History Month, and an annual children's concert usually held in the fall.

In 2014, Composer's Voice presented the themed concert "Exploring New Timbres" at Carnegie Hall which featured the guitarist Kenji Haba and the cellist Susan Davita Mandell of the ensemble Duo Anova, and Sandy Hughes, Conway Kuo, and Satoshi Okamoto of the Bateria Trio.

Composer's Voice also featured pianist Mathew McCright in 2019 at Weil Recital Hall at Carnegie Hall presenting the works of living composers: Kirsten Broberg, Kyong Mee Choi, Christopher Coleman, Sean Friar, Dorothy Hindman, Mike McFerron, Ingrid Stölzel, and Robert Voisey

Composer's Voice featured the Chatterton-McCright Duo at the Mary Cary Flagler Hall in the DiMenna Center in 2021.

In 2021 Composer's Voice transitioned from a chamber concert series into the Television medium. Composer's Voice became a 30 minute TV show airing on cable access TV in Manhattan on the Manhattan Neighborhood Network. The show has featured many musicians including Argus Quartet, Joseph Bohigian, Monica Chew, Deux Saisons, Robert Dick, Linda Chatterton, Mary Hubbell, Craig Hultgren, Joe LaRocca, Thomas Piercy, Matthew McCright, Mary Beth Orr, Jakub Polaczyk, Keri Lee Pierson, Charlie Rauh, Alyssa Reit, Belinda Reynolds, Christopher Schoelen, Talla Rouge, Stas Venglevski, Andrew White.

"Composer's Voice, spotlights composers and performers, and a recent interview with guitarist and composer Charlie Rauh caught my attention." - Eunmi Ko

Vox Novus has collaborated with several new music organizations to further its mission. The Composer's Voice Concert Series has been one of the company's vehicles for collaboration, including events with the Birmingham Art Music Alliance in 2003 and composer and the dance group Vision of Sound in 2012.

== History ==
- In 2001, the Composer's Voice Concert Series was founded by Robert Voisey as the first concert series produced by Vox Novus.
- On May 10, 2001, Composer's Voice held its first performance at Elebash Recital Hall in the CUNY Graduate Center in New York City. Later that year, the series had its first collaboration concert with La Scala De San Telmo in Buenos Aires, Argentina, and at Advent Lutheran Church in New York.
- In 2002, Vox Novus partnered with the Living Music Foundation which became a collaborator and fiscal conduit for the Composer's Voice Concert Series.
- In 2003, the Composer's Voice Concert Series collaborated with the Birmingham Art Music Alliance to present a concert in both New York City and Birmingham, Alabama.
- In 2006, there was no series.
- In 2007, Robert Voisey met Monica Harte and Christian McLeer and together they revived the Composer's Voice Concert Series as co-directors in a joint production of the series with Vox Novus, Remarkable Theater Brigade and Jan Hus Presbyterian Church.
- In 2009, composer Douglas DaSilva joined the series as artistic director.
- In 2011, the Composer's Voice Concert Series started a new project of works called "Fifteen-Minutes-of-Fame" promoting one-minute miniatures written from composers living around the world.
- In 2015, two Composer's Voice concerts with Fifteen-Minutes-of-Fame took place at Symphony Space in New York City to celebrate 15 years of Vox Novus producing and presenting new music.
- In 2016, Composer's Voice moved to The Firehouse Space in Brooklyn with concerts on the third Thursday of every month.
- The summer of 2020 marked the place where Composer's Voice resumed production as and online performance
- April 2021 Composer's Voice transitioned into the Television medium and became a 30 minute TV show airing on cable access TV in Manhattan on the Manhattan Neighborhood Network

== Articles and reviews ==
- Music and Healing by Eunmi Ko - Eunmak Journal, Volume 426 June 2025
- David Mecionis, "Composer's Voice Concert Series May 19, 2016 at Brooklyn's Firehouse Space", Sound Word Sight, May 30, 2016
- "Stony Brook Composers Concert in Brooklyn, April 21". SBU Happenings, April 18, 2016
- "Joseph Bohigian curates Composer's Voice Concert", The Armenian Mirror, March 24, 2016
- Seth Gilman, "Composer's Voice in miniatures", Examiner, February 23, 2013
- Erin Bomboy, "Composer's Voice: Hear and See Tomorrow, Today", Dance Musings, August 28, 2012
- Alan Hoskins, "KCKCC takes electroacoustic music to NYC", Kansas City Kansan, July 10, 2012
- Brant Lyon, "Composer's Voice is fresh!", Great Weather for Media, March 26, 2012
- Julia Crowe, "Letter from New York", Classical Guitar Magazine, September 2009
- John de Clef Pineiro, "October 20, 2002 Composer's Voice Concert", New Music Connoisseur, March 2003, vol. 11, no. 1
- Michael Huebner, "New York, Birmingham duel by using new compositions"
