= Ingolf (disambiguation) =

Ingolf is a masculine given name. It may also refer to:

== Places ==
- Ingolf Fjord (Ingolf Inlet), Greenland, Denmark; a sound in northeast Greenland
- Ingolf Fjeld (Ingolf Mesa), Greenland, Denmark; a mountain in southeast Greenland
- Ingolf, Ontario, Canada; an unincorporated region of Kenora district

== Transportation ==
- HDMS Ingolf, a ship name of the Royal Danish Navy
- R/V Ingolf, a Danish oceanographic ship memorialized in a frieze at the Oceanographic Museum of Monaco

== Other uses ==
- Eva Ingolf, Icelandic violinist
