= Robert Voisey =

American composer and producer

Voisey circa 2007

Robert Voisey (born 1969) is a composer and producer of electroacoustic and chamber music. He founded Vox Novus in 2000 to promote the music of contemporary composers and in 2001 created The American Composer Timeline, the first in-depth listing of American composers, spanning from 1690 to the present, to appear on the Internet. A producer of new music and multi-media concerts and events, Voisey is best known for producing the 60x60 project, which he started in 2003 in order to promote contemporary composers and their music. He also founded and directs the Composer's Voice Concert Series as well as the chamber music project Fifteen-Minutes-of-Fame as well as vice president of programs for the Living Music Foundation.

== Composer ==
Voisey's compositions fall under a few definitive genres: neo-romantic, ambient, mash-up, text-sound, and dramatic/operatic. His neo-romantic works tend to be chamber works for acoustic instruments while the other styles are electronic incorporating electronic playback of some form. Involved in various types of multimedia, Voisey collaborates with video, dance, poetry, stage performers and others. He has written for film and theatrical stage performances.

Voisey’s work as a composer has also been the subject of independent critical discussion. In a 2026 New York Times “Critic’s Notebook” article examining the effects of intoxication on musical performance, critic Corinna da Fonseca-Wollheim discussed Voisey’s Knots, a graphic score for three instrumentalists presented by Composers Concordance in New York City. The article described the work as exploring the balance between compositional control and performer agency, situating it within a broader discussion of notation, timing, and interpretive freedom in contemporary classical music.

Voisey's compositions have been performed 12th Annual CompCord Festival: Ali Baba & the 40 Thieves Electronic Music Event,A*Devantgarde festival, ComposerFest, Birmingham New Music Festival 2024 Electronic Music Midwest festival, the International Electroacoustic Festival at Brooklyn College, ÉuCuE xxvii festival, Digital Art Weeks, the Spark Festival, and the ThreeTwo festival, as well as the TRANSreveLATION concert, the National University of Music in Bucharest The Brick Elephant, Fine and Dandy, the August Art concert, the Composer's Voice Concert Series, and the 60x60 project.

His work routinely receives airplay on WKCR's Arts & Answers and Art Wave radio programs as well as Max Shea's Martian Gardens on WMUA. Voisey was featured on RadioAscoli program Classica-E in Italy presented by radio host Daria Baiocch.

=== Neo-romantic and chamber works ===
Voisey's piano solo work "persistence of melancholy" was presented at Weil Recital Hall at Carnegie Hall by pianist Matthew McCright. This work was also included on the album "Endurance" which features the same artist and program presented in that hall.

Voisey’s romantic art songs "Dos Palabras" (Spanish for "Two Words", an idiom meaning "I Love You" [Spanish: Te quiero.]). The text of the art songs are based on the work of Argentinean poet Alfonsina Storni. It is a duet commissioned by Agueda Pages and has been premiered by her in New York City, Bremen, Germany and Valencia, Spain. This song cycle has had several performances in New York City at Jan Hus Church at the Composer’s Voice Concert series; the Argentinean Consulate, and at Christ & St Stevens Church for the XL performance. "Dos Palabras" has also been performed in Barcelona, Spain.

"Poppetjie" a 10-minute opera of Voisey's was premiered at Carnegie Hall and presented by the Remarkable Theater Brigade’s Opera Shorts. "Poppetjie" is a story about a little girl who projects her notions of marriage and relationships onto her doll and teddy bear. Poppetjie is an Afrikaans word meaning "little doll."

Versatile in short form and miniatures, Voisey's chamber orchestra work "sic second chance" was a six-second work selected by Vine Orchestra for recording with 51 other six second miniatures.

He has also written the work "Music is Poetry in Motion" for high voice and instrument accompaniment. He is both the composer and the author for the text of this short song cycle which contains: "blank pages," "flowing streams," "poetry gone," and "heavy clouds." This work has received performances around the world including New York City, German and Bucharest.

Voisey's short work for flute solo "Before Corcovado," was selected for Fifteen Minutes of Fame and performed by Carolina Cavalcanti]. She premiered it in Buenos Aires and New York City. In New York City, a reviewer explained, "avidly conveys feelings of anticipation experienced by pious travelers willing to ascend great heights by way of rail, road, and foot to pay their respects to the mammoth Christ the Redeemer statue."

His work "run rabbit run" was set to dance by the organization Vision of Sound, a collaborative project between composers and choreographers.

=== Mashup/Sampling ===
Voisey's work 50-second miniature Oregon, was selected for Jon Nelson's 50/50 project. The "50/50" CD release by Recombinations/mnartists 2010 with 49 other DJ’s composers, and sound artists. Inspired by this project Voisey continued this post-modern style creating other 50 second miniature he calls States. New York, another miniature, is part of the 60x60 (2010) International Mix and received debuts at London.’s Stratford Circus as well as in St Louis and Japan. The works North Dakota, Oregon, Texas, West Virginia, Hawaii, Virginia, Maryland, and Illinois all debuted in New York City on the Vox Novus "Club" concerts.

His work Shades of Forte described as a "...imaginatively offbeat work..." "...was woven from bursts of recorded music and sounds, striking out alone or overlapping, contrasting." This composition was selected for Electronic Music Midwest as well as the Composer's Voice Concert Series and Fine and Dandy.

"I Want My Bottle" was commissioned for and performed at the EM-NY Festival, Electroacoustic Speakeasy and Burlesque Show and performed by Darlinda Just Darlinda.

Several of Voisey's 60-second miniatures featuring samples and are examples of mash-ups were selected for 60x60 mixes including: Sullen, Electric Trains, Executive Decision, and We Are All 60x60.

TainTed T is a sample work dedicated to Noah Creshevsky and written for a performance at Klavierhaus in New York City honoring Creshevsky's 60th birthday.

In 2005, Voisey's work Bounce won best electroacoustic composition in Komposer Kombat. The work is based on samples provided by Kalvos & Damian New Music Bazaar which hosted the competition.

=== Ambient ===
Voisey creates many electronic works in the ambient or dark ambient music genres. He creates these works primarily by layering and manipulating audio samples. The first of his works; to exemplify this techniques are starfields (2002) and Hourglass: base, traverse, and land (2003). The Hourglass movement base was published on the Brooklyn College Electroacoustic CD. His work Lust (2003) was the first ambient piece of his to be performed with live voice in conjunction to electronic playback. Later in October 2010, Voisey's piece, Flute Lust, (a flute version of the work) would premier at Electronic Music Midwest at Lewis University in Romeoville, Illinois, performed by flutist Rebecca Ashe.

The ambient work ripples in sand would be selected for the 60x60 International Mix of that project and later published on the 60x60 (2003) by Capstone Records.

Lament and Sorrow was commissioned by Serban Nichifor and dedicated to Nichifor's departed wife Liana Alexandra and premiered on her memorial concert in Bucharest, Romania and performed at the Romanian Athenaeum as well as a performance at the George Enescu Festival. The work was also included on a special memorial concert in New York City sponsored in part by the Romanian Cultural Institute.

Voisey has performed his ambient works himself 2nd Annual Composers Play Composers Marathon presented by COMPOSERS CONCORDANCE and his work melting was performed at Composers Concordance Festival 2 ("Evolution") Marathon @ Drom. "Voisey's Melting was a sudden change of pace (just vocals with electronics), a very well done performance of a moving piece delivered with care, making an instant connection with the audience." - Kevin Williams.

He also performs his ambient works regularly on Composer's Voice Concert Series by Vox Novus.

==== Constellations ====
Being a singer who is trained in using extended vocal techniques, Voisey uses samples of his voice to create ambient works. He records his voice using polyphonic throat-singing and layers the recorded vocal tracks to create sonic ambient landscapes. One of these music projects is called Constellations where he creates one-minute ambient works where each miniature is named after one of the 88 constellations used in modern astronomy. Voisey then layers and sequences one or more of the ambient constellations forming a sonic "mobile" to create a larger acoustic work. Each mix of sonic constellations is named after the venue or project for which it was commissioned. The Constellations TRANSreveLATION Mix was the first constellations mix created for the TRANSreveLATION concert in New York City. This was followed by Constellations: EMM MIX, written for the Electronic Music Midwest Festival, Composer's Voice Mix, No Extra Notes Mix, Das Punk and Krooner Mix, Constellations 2CC Mix, and Constellations: Romeoville Mix.

The Constellations project is specifically designed for the one-minute miniatures to be performed singularly, sequenced one after another as a string of works or in a layer "mobile" fashion to create a new mix.

Robert Voisey’s suite of six movements, Constellations, was for fixed media and dancers. Each miniature—a genre in which Voisey excels as he is the creator of 60x60, a concert series devoted to music lasting sixty seconds—was vocally based. I caught spinets of raga and Middle Eastern influence with the embellishments. Though in six movements with an ever-so-slight pause in between each, the sounds remained similar throughout. At first I was nonplussed, but by the end was won over by the steadfastness and singularity of purpose and idea. The choreography was clever; white clad dancers used various light sources (hand-held light strands, single-bulb palm flashlights, and a Christmas light-wrapped dancer) to manipulate the darkness of the stage and hall according to each constellation’s implied persona. – Eclectic electronics By Lee Hartman KCMetropolis.org Tue, Oct 4, 2011

Ursa Minor and Sagittarius are constellations selected for 60x60 mixes.

=== Text-sound ===
Voisey collaborated with David Morneau in a contemporary new music ensemble called Elevator Machine Room (aka EMR). In this ensemble, Voisey created several narrative works, one of them is called Monkey Lab.

He collaborated with Anne Cammon in India Songs described as "acoustic meditations each gesture happens in its own envelope of light, each word falls on the air like a drop of honey or rain." This included performances at the Bowery Poetry Club, the Nuyorican, Cornelia Street Cafe and Beauty Keeps Laying Its Sharp Knife Against Me, a compilation CD of poets and music. Another collaboration, Living Apart was selected for Digital Art Weeks SOUNDSCAPE & HOERSPIEL 08 A Diamond in the Mud.

== Producer ==
Voisey is regarded as having ambitious ideas not only for the dissemination of contemporary music and art performance but for the number of audience members interested in such productions, routinely bringing rarefied forms of artistic expression into the mainstream. Chris Pasles of the Los Angeles Times listed him as one of the composers showing creativity in getting music heard.

=== 60x60 ===
One of Voisey’s most notable projects which he produces, and directs is 60x60. Voisey founded 60x60 in 2003 with it premier performance in New York City. 60x60 started as an electronic audio project presenting 60 recorded audio works by 60 different composers, each of the works 60 seconds or less in duration. The works are presented in sequence one after the other with each minute synchronized to an analog clock. Voisey describes 60x60: "Each work is a microcosm of the larger "marco-work". Because there are no pauses between works, each minute influences another. Some works complement each other while others contrast with their differing aesthetics and styles. The 60x60 performance hour is a representation of our community of artists as much as it is a representation of artistic ideas, styles, and aesthetics." "The project has grown exponentially and now regularly includes multiple mixes representing various geographic regions."

60x60’s primary focus is to create an artistic representation of the electronic music being created in society today and to present that music to a large audience. Giving composers a "voice" to express themselves. Each 60x60 performance mix contains a wide variety of musical styles and aesthetics. "Founder Robert Voisey said the 60-centric format – inspired by other intermission-free performances in New York – is designed to retain audiences' attention. And through "60x60," he hopes to expose newcomers to electronic music."

"Part of the mission is to represent diverse composers from all walks of life," said Voisey, who was quoted at the debut of the 60x60 UnTwelve Mix for the Magical Musical Showcase series at the Museum of Contemporary Art in Chicago, Illinois. "The point of the project is that it enables an audience to take in and enjoy a cross section of different approaches to new music within a reasonable duration. The purpose of Robert Voisey is to promote new music ... "A strong advocate for contemporary composition, Voisey finds innovative formats in which to produce and promote his music and the work of his colleagues. "His 60x60 project... brings packaged electroacoustic concerts to venues worldwide..." He is quoted as saying, "My belief is that there is a hungry audience out there waiting to be inspired and touched by the music and ideas that today's composer has to offer." 60x60 is a contemporary music project putting 60 one minute works together in a one-hour performance. "The point of the project is that it enables an audience to take in and enjoy a cross section of different approaches to new music within a reasonable duration. And the purpose of Robert Voisey is to promote new music" 60x60 is "to represent diverse composers from all walks of life"

The project boasts producing over 30 different mixes and presenting more than 2000 composers from the thousands of submissions it receives from its call for works.

Voisey designed 60x60 to be a telescopic project which can grow to fit the needs of a venue or satisfy the appetite of a curious audience. The project has spanned more than 20 countries on 6 continents and has been presented in many different multimedia incarnations including 60x60 Dance, 60x60 Video, and 60x60 Images. 60x60 has inspired composers and artists alike where both the concept of 60x60 and the work created for it has taken on a life of its own such as David Morneau's 60x365, David McIntire's Putney Project. Several of the one-minute works written for 60x60 grow and stand on their own or as part of larger works like Daniel Weymouth's A Breath for Rob

==== 60x60 Dance ====
In 2007, as 60x60 Director, Voisey began the 60x60 collaboration with dance. The first performance was held its premier at Jan Hus Presbyterian Church in New York City. It also received a performance at Galapagos Art Space in D.U.M.B.O. Brooklyn. Described as a "bold initiative" Of his 60x60 Dance collaboration with choreographer Jeramy Zimmerman in 2008, Roslyn Sulcas in The New York Times wrote:

The idea—60 new dance pieces are performed to 60 new pieces of music, each lasting no more than 60 seconds—is quite mad. But it is this kind of madness that makes the cultural world go round, and so our thanks are due to the composer Robert Voisey, who first came up with the concept in 2003.

The November 14, 2008 performance at the World Financial Center Winter Garden Atrium attracted upwards of 1500 audience members, a number which is considered unusually high in the contemporary music and dance world.

Since then 60x60 Dance has received international acclaim and has been presented in countries around the world. Voisey presented 60x60 Dance at Stratford Circus which was endorsed by the 2012 London Olympics for their Open Weekend. Time Out London says:

Either a genius or crazy concept for a dance show, depending on how you look at it: 60 choreographers each create 60 seconds of movement to be performed in succession, making one hour of fast-changing, switched up dance … there's one thing you can say for sure, it won't be boring.

In Toronto, 60x60 Dance "turned out to be a thoroughly enjoyable and original hour", claimed by Paula Citron from Classical 96.3 who continues to rave, " All kinds of kudos to dance artist Vivien Moore who assigned the music to the choreographers, and shaped the show to have some kind of continuity. How she merged the various dancers, and figured out exits and entrances was miraculous."

60x60 Dance premiered in St. Louis at MadArt Gallery, and has been returning yearly to The Sheldon and has been presented on public television. "Robert Voisey collected and culled 60 musical arrangements from many more submissions, all to inspire the performers and stimulate the audience." -Minute to Win It, By Alison Sieloff.

==== 60x60 Video ====
Voisey produced a video collaboration with Patrick Liddell for 360 degrees of 60x60 containing 6 hours of video for each of the 6 RED Mixes of 360 degrees of 60x60 originally created for the 2010 ICMC.

Voisey presented 60x60 in collaboration with video artist Zlatko Cosic at the 2007 Electronic Music Midwest festival, about which SEAMUS Journal said that Voisey "did an exemplary job of forming a sonic tapestry comprised of extremely diverse material by extremely diverse composers. Sensitive video accompaniment by Zlatko Cosic also helped organize the concert into a more coherent whole."

==== Orchestra 60x60 ====
Voisey is also co-directing an ambitious project with Mike McFerron and David Morneau called Orchestra 60x60. Orchestra 60x60 is a completely acoustic project written for orchestra which is based on the 60x60 concept, 60 one-minute orchestra works written by 60 different contemporary composers presented in a continuous hour performance. Orchestra 60x60 was first presented at the Conductors Guild Conference in 2009.

=== Fifteen-Minutes-of-Fame ===
Another miniature project of Voisey is Fifteen-Minutes-of-Fame. This project calls for composers to write one-minute works for a specific musician or ensemble. 15 works are selected and the musician premieres the works. In 2024 Mary Beth Orr a singer and horn player selected 15 works from living composers around the world and performed them at AllArtWorks in Grand Rapids.

For the fifteenth anniversary of 9/11, the West Point Band premiered fifteen one-minute works that honor the contributions of those men and women at Trinity Church in New York City.

=== Other projects ===
Through Vox Novus, Voisey is the founder and producer of 60x60, the Composer's Voice Concert Series, Fifteen-Minutes-of-Fame, Circuit Bridges, XMV, and the American Composer Timeline. He is the Organizational Advancement Director of the Electronic Music Midwest Festival since 2011. He is also the administrator for Composer's Site created and founded by Stephen Lias as well as the administrator for Music Avatar.

== Life ==
Beginning his college career as a double major in computer science and mathematics and the son of two accountants, Voisey was an unlikely student of classical composition. He met his first composition teacher, Oded Zehavi, while taking a composition class for non-majors at Stony Brook University. Zehavi then invited him to join his fledgling composition program at Tel-Hai Academic College in the Upper Galilee of Israel. Accepting the invitation, Voisey was soon heard on Kol Yisrael Israel Radio and received his first contemporary performances at the College.

Voisey went on to study music in the Master's Program at Brooklyn College with composers Noah Creshevsky and George Brunner. Using his voice as a primary instrument, Voisey applied electronic techniques of sampling, digital processing and multi-track layering to his own work. Voisey belonged to the Brooklyn College Electro-Acoustic Ensemble where his work was featured on three CDs and several concerts at the International Electroacoustic Festivals as well as composer concerts produced by the music department.

He left the program at Brooklyn College to strike out on his own as a composer with an entrepreneurial spirit. He founded Vox Novus in 2000 and created the American Composers Timeline. In 2001 he founded and created a chamber concerts called the Composer's Voice Concert Series. This series has been housed in a range of venues in New York City including South Oxford Space in Brooklyn, The Gershwin Hotel, Under St. Mark’s Theater, Collective: Unconscious, Christ St. Stephen’s Church, and most recently found its home at Jan Hus Church. In 2002, Voisey became the vice President of the Living Music Foundation.

Voisey first came up with the idea for 60x60 in 2002, put out a call, and produced the premier of 60x60 in 2003 at Under St. Mark’s Theater. Over a decade, Voisey has brought the 60x60 project to hundreds of venues across the globe including New York City's World Financial Center Winter Garden Atrium, Stratford Circus, the Sheldon for the American Art Experience in St. Louis, In 2008, he created a short live experimental video screening series called XMV which was presented at Collective: Unconscious. And in 2009, he created the Fifteen Minutes of Fame project. In 2011 Voisey became the Organizational Advancement Director for the Electronic Music Midwest festival.

As a performer, Voisey has sung and performed all over the world including venues such as The Tank, Gallery MC, Cornelia Street Cafe, Roulette Composers Concordance Festival at Drom, Westbeth Music Festival International Electroacoustic Music Festival at Brooklyn College Composer's Voice Concert Series in New York City; Electronic Music Midwest festival in Kansas City, Kansas and Romeoville, Illinois; as well as, touring in the Kibbutzim choir in Israel.

Voisey is also a member of the ~chromatik_d_zabu.tmp (~CDZ) under the pseudonym, "Vox." ~CDZabu is a non-profit organization where its members collaborate online in order to create electronic music available on the World Wide Web.

Voisey and David Morneau also make up the electronic music duo Elevator Machine Room also known as EMR.

Voisey has also been featured and interviewed on Talkback with Mark Laios on WBAI 99.5 FM, No Extra Notes with Richard Zarou, Noizepunk & Das Krooner show #21 and Kalvos & Damian New Music Bazaar #454 Arts & Answers on WKCR FM NY, and WUTC with Rabbit Zielke.

== Articles and reviews ==
- And One for Mahler … Experiments in Drunk Music Making New York Times CRITIC’S NOTEBOOK By Corinna da Fonseca-Wollheim - February 6, 2026
- Composer’s Voice Concert Series May 19, 2016 at Brooklyn’s Firehouse Space by David Mecionis, Sound Word Sight May 30, 2016
- Joseph Bohigian curates Composer’s Voice Concert The Armenian Mirror - March 24, 2016 12:08 PM
- Eclectic electronics By Lee Hartman KCMetropolis.org Tue, Oct 4, 2011
- 60x60: netsuke for the musical mind By Richard Arnest Sounding Board, Spring 2011
- Robert Voisey – 50/50 by Jon Nelson – Some Assembly Required, Saturday, October 16, 2010
- 60x60 Dance Big Dance
- Maximaliste! by Réjean Beaucage, VOIR, MAY 27, 2010
- No time to fool around: Robert Voisey and the "madness" of the 60X60 project By Tobias Fischer, White Fungus, Issue 11 – 2010
- 'Dance Around the Clock By Carl Glassman, The Tribeca Trib published December 8, 2009
- You have one minute By David Cutler, The Savvy Musician, Helius Press, published October 26, 2009
- Minute hand to sweep performers on, offstage By Amy Saunders The Columbus Dispatch published Saturday, October 3, 2009
- "Rob Voisey: 60x60 Dance" By Suzanne Thorpe, Electronic Music Foundation, December 21, 2008
- "An Express Without Any Delays" By ROSLYN SULCAS, New York Times, November 17, 2008
- Brant Lyon & Friends / Beauty Keeps Laying Its Sharp Knife Against Me by JoAnne McFarland, NYC Big City Lit, Fall 2008
- Arts Now! 60 X 60 2008 by Karen Moorman "Classical Voice in North Carolina", November 2008
- Flash Dance Entertaining in a New York minute By Eudie Pak – Village Voice – Wednesday, Nov 5, 2008
- "Gone in 60 Minutes: Electronic Compositions Showcased at NC State University" Alexandra Jones, "Classical Voice in North Carolina", October 1, 2007
- "WRITERS' BLOCK", Chris Pasles "Los Angeles Times", July 22, 2007
- "Time and Motion", Anne Cammon, "Fly Global Music Culture", May 26, 2007
- "In Concert, 60 Times the Fun", Sophia Yan, "Oberlin Review", April 27, 2007
- "60x60 Project presents 60 composers in 60 minutes", Rachel Slade, "North Texas Daily", February 28, 2007
- "Sound Sampler", Greg Haymes "Times Union", February 9, 2006
- "Ingenuity and madness?", Malcolm Miller, "Music & Vision Daily", December 24, 2005
- "From Irish Eyes to Short Attention Spans", Frank J. Oteri & John Schaefer, "Soundcheck", WNYC, New York, March 17, 2005
- "Got a Minute? A Few Words on Music in 60 Seconds or Less", Robert Voisey with additional reporting by Frank J. Oteri, "NewMusicBox", May 1, 2004

== Interviews ==
- Interview on WBAI 99.5 FM (Talkback with Mark Laiosa) Thursday December 27, 2012 4:00 PM
- 60x60 Dance at The Sheldon in St Louis on HEC-TV – Interviews of cast and producers plus entire show. October 2010
- No time to fool around: Robert Voisey and the "madness" of the 60X60 project By Tobias Fischer, White Fungus, Issue 11 – 2010
- November 6, 2009 – New Music Circle By Steve Potter, Cityscape NPR St. Louis Public Radio published November 6, 2009
- Interview with Voisey on No Extra Notes by Richard Zarou August 9, 2009
- Arts & Answers on WKCR FM NY interviews Voisey and Jeramy Zimmerman, November 13, 2008
- Noizepunk & Das Krooner show #21 Noizepunk & Das Krooner interviews Voisey about his 60x60 project and a new work Constellations, July 14, 2007
- Kalvos & Damian New Music Bazaar show No. 523, BoRenGurka 120x100 Kalvos & Damian New Music Bazaar, June 11, 2005
- Kalvos & Damian New Music Bazaar show No. 454, The Catafalque of Valentines Kalvos & Damian New Music Bazaar, February 14, 2004

== Discography ==
- foolish fantasies Mem Phasma Music released 2022
- Persistence of Melancholy ENDURANCE - New Music for Piano Vox Novus released 2021
- Crumpled Sonnets Remix Love Songs Remix Composer Concordance Records released February 14, 2015
- Aries, Chameleon, Eridanus, Gemini, Orion, Sagittarius, Vela, Electronic Music Midwest Irritable Hedgehog released November 11, 2013
- The Morning After, B'ak'tun Waning Immigrant Breast Nest released December 21, 2012
- Oregon, "50/50" Recombinations/mnartists 2010
- Sagittarius, 60x60 (2006–2007) Vox Novus VN-002 released 2008
- India Songs, "Beauty Keeps Laying Its Sharp Knife Against Me" LOGOchrysalis Productions 2008
- tongues, 60x60 (2004–2005) Vox Novus VN-001 released 2007
- Vol XXIV – From The Outskirts of The Milky Way – March 2007 – ~chromatik_d_zabu.tmp(~CDZ)

– featuring the collaboration of Marsmalade, Angry Jane, JS, Martouk, Vox (a.k.a. Robert Voisey), Exorziser
[1] enceladus groove, [2] spelun king, [3] the folk, [4] polynesian escape, [5] dark oasis, [6] sitzprobe

- Vol XXI – Haute cuisine – November 2006 – ~chromatik_d_zabu.tmp(~CDZ)

– featuring the collaboration of e-plastic, Snvl, Intentolla, eze, Vox (a.k.a. Robert Voisey)
[1] next door marmalade,[2] love me blender, [3] in memoriam of dishwasher sprites, [4] mario cleaning dishes, [5] undead steak

- Vol XVIII – The New Voice of Chromatic Disgruntlement – August 2006 – ~chromatik_d_zabu.tmp(~CDZ)

– featuring the collaboration of Snvl, Dr Chnolles, b.p.-y.m., Mike V + Vox Novus: Rob Voisey, Greg Bartholomew, Antonino Cuscina, Larry Gaab, David Morneau, David Newby, John Saylor, Jane Wang
[1] vogel's private hell, [2] da vinci downtown, [3] not asleep yet, [4] mr. glitch meets glitchbot, [5] dr. turbano, [6] urba lulkanto, [7] voltaire's underwear, [8] deep drag gone, [9] synq, [10] descent into chaos, [11] better late than never, [12] spidered sidewalks of glam, [13] do you dream in black and white?

- Vol IX – Live in Kansas City – September 2005 – ~chromatik_d_zabu.tmp(~CDZ)

– featuring the collaboration of M. Velouté, e-plastic, Snvl, Pablo, Fred, Don Malone (EMM – Roosevelt University, Illinois), Greg Dixon (EMM ), Robert Voisey (EMM – Vox Novus)
[1] Midwest, [2] elevator, [3] october, [4] existence, [5] hotels, [6] parallel audience, [7] mtv prairie, [8] longhorn steakhouse

- ripples in sand, 60x60 (2003) Capstone Records CPS-8744 released 2005
- Mission: MARS, "BC Sound Serum", Brooklyn College Electro-Acoustic Ensemble released 2004
- Hourglass: Base, "BCMix", Brooklyn College Electro-Acoustic Ensemble released 2003
- Lullaby, Brooklyn College Electro-Acoustic Ensemble released 2000
