= Anne Vanschothorst =

Dutch harpist and composer

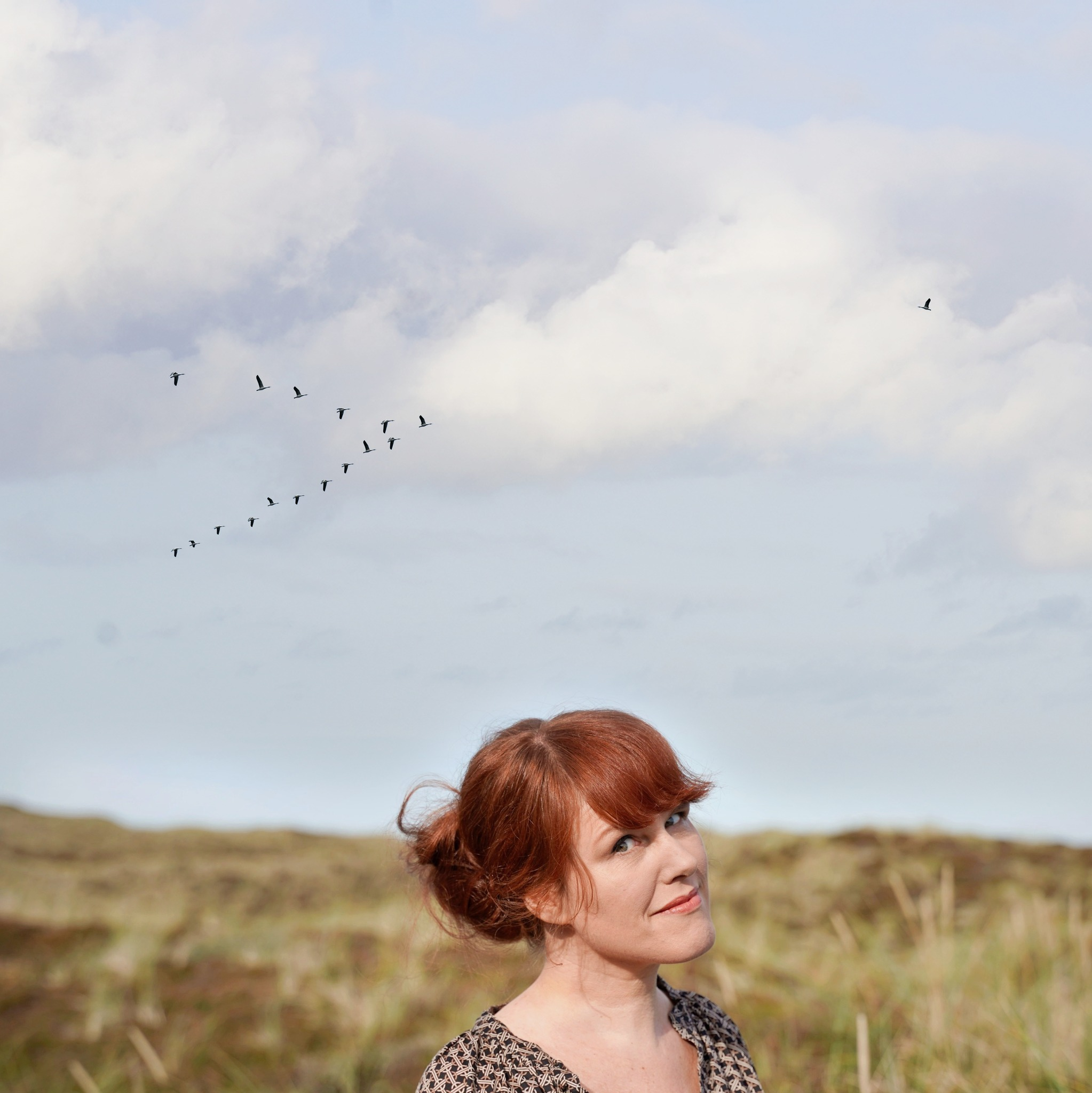
- Anne Vanschothorst

Background information
- Born: July 9, 1974 (age 50); Netherlands
- Genres: Classical
- Occupation(s): Harpist and composer
- Instrument: Harp
- Website: annevanschothorst.com

Anne Vanschothorst (born 9 July 1974 in Emmen, Drenthe) is a Dutch harpist and composer.

She plays the pedal harp, celtic harp and historical harps as well; an antique Erard harp (double action) and a Schwieso Grosjean (single action).

The Canadian composer Jean Chatillon has dedicated to her a composition for harp solo. Vanschothorst composed her first music piece, "Still Life" at age 15. The composition is originally written for harp and flute and later arranged for harp solo.

Vanschothorst is producing CDs and DVDs for her indy label Harp and Soul Productions. She is also responsible for the compositions and film recordings of these productions. She has been assigned also for composition projects.

The composition "Streetlife" has been selected from many submissions for the 60x60 project in 2006–2007, of composer and musician Robert Voisey.

Several compositions could be heard on (inter)national radio stations and podcasts. Radio Indy has honoured Vanschothorst with the Gold Artist award for the CD I am a Dreamer.

She participates with poets, musicians and composers. With the Swedish composer Goran Jonasson, the English singer Sharon Selman, the American flutist Cathy Feldman and Swedish pianist Morgan Martinsson she is creating the CD Pink Anacondas. They work and participate together via internet and Myspace.

== Style ==
The compositions are related to minimal music; influences of composers as Philip Glass and Yann Tiersen can be heard in her work.

The compositions of the CD Aarden (2007) can be characterised as meditative and even mystical and are being compared with a mantra. The music is acoustical and instrumental.

Her improvisation techniques (CD I am a dreamer, 2008) are influenced by jazz music, classical music and the celtic music tradition.

The addition of soundscapes and spoken poetry to her recordings are a part of her work method too.

Vanschothorst adds also film as an addition to her compositions. The artistic images are photografical taken or post processed with filters.

== Discography ==
- Ek Is Eik – CD (DMI 2014)
- Aarden – CD of meditative music for harp solo (H&S Productions 2007)
- I am a Dreamer – CD of improvisations, harp solo (H&S Productions 2008)
- De huizen van Dordrecht – EP of harp music and spoken poetry; poems by well known Dutch poet Jan Eijkelboom. (H&S Productions 2008)
- 60x60 (2006–2007) – CD of electronic music, composition "Streetlife" has been selected for international edition, initiator Robert Voisey (Vox Novus 2008)
