= Faye-Ellen Silverman =

American composer (born 1947)

- Born: October 2, 1947; New York City, New York, United States
- Education: Barnard College (BA); Harvard University (MA); Columbia University (DMA)
- Musical career
- Occupation: Composer

Faye-Ellen Silverman (born October 2, 1947) is an American composer of contemporary classical music. She is also an author and an educator.

== Life and education ==
Born in New York, New York, Silverman began studying music at the Dalcroze School of Music shortly before her fourth birthday. At thirteen she won the Parents’ League Competition, judged by Leopold Stokowski, leading to her performing her winning composition in Carnegie Hall, and to an appearance on the Sonny Fox TV show Wonderama. She studied piano, clarinet, and some viola, and participated in school bands, orchestras, and choirs. After twelve years at Dalcroze, she then spent a year in the Preparatory Division of the Manhattan School of Music before leaving for college at the end of her junior year of high school.

She attended Barnard College, where she studied composition with Otto Luening and took a class in 20th-century music with Henry Cowell. She graduated cum laude and with honors in music after spending her junior year at the Mannes College of Music, where she studied composition with William Sydeman. She went on to get her AM in music composition at Harvard (studying composition with Leon Kirchner and Lukas Foss, counterpoint with David del Tredici, analysis with Earl Kim, and 20th-century techniques with Donald Martino and Harold Shapiro). While living in Cambridge, she continued her private piano studies with Russell Sherman. She then returned to Columbia University for her DMA, where she studied composition and electronic music with Vladimir Ussachevsky, composition with Jack Beeson, and 20th-century techniques with Chou Wen-chung.

In the summer of 2004 Silverman participated in the Center for World Music's workshop held in Bali. In 2013, she was chosen for the ASDP China Field Seminar "China's Encounter with the West: Past, Present, and Future". In addition to memberships in ASCAP, CMS, IAWM, and NYWC, she is a Founding Board Member of the International Women's Brass Conference (for which she has served as composer-in-residence), a founding member of Music Under Construction, a composers' collective, and a founding member of the International Women’s Review Board (ABI).

=== Composing ===
Silverman became a published composer in her mid-twenties when Seesaw Music Corporation accepted Three Movements for Saxophone Alone. She became a member of ASCAP that same year. Seesaw Music published all of her subsequent compositions until the death of its owner, Raoul Ronson. Subito Music Corporation acquired the catalogue of Seesaw Music in 2006. Seesaw, a division of Subito Music Corporation, has continued to publish Silverman’s works.

Silverman's music has won many awards. These include the selection of her Oboe-sthenics to represent the United States at the International Rostrum of Composers/UNESCO, resulting in international radio broadcasts (1982); winning the Indiana State [Orchestral] Composition Contest, resulting in a performance by the Indianapolis Symphony (1982); a Governor's Citation (1982); and having September 30, 1982 named Faye-Ellen Silverman Day in Baltimore by Mayor William Donald Schaefer. Additionally, she has been the recipient of the National League of American Pen Women’s biennial music award (2002), yearly Standard Awards from ASCAP (now known as ASCAPlus) since 1983, several Meet the Composer grants, and an American Music Center grant. She has been a fellow at the Virginia Center for the Creative Arts (2007), a resident scholar at the Villa Serbelloni of the Rockefeller Foundation (1987), a Composers' Conference Fellow (1985), a Yaddo Fellow (1984), and a MacDowell Fellow (1982).

The Baltimore Symphony, the Brooklyn Philharmonic, the Greater Bridgeport Symphony, the New Orleans Philharmonic, the International Experimental Music Festival in Bourges, ISCM – Korea section, Nieuwe Oogst (Belgium), Grupo Musica Hoje (Brazil), the Corona Guitar Quartet (Denmark), the Monday Evening Concert series (L.A.), and the Aspen Music Festival are among the groups that have performed Dr. Silverman’s works. Her music is also regularly performed at The Construction Company in New York City. She has received commissions from the Edinboro University Chamber Players, Seraphim, Philip A. De Simone (in memory of Linda J. Warren), Larry Madison, Thomas Matta, the International Women’s Brass Conference, the Monarch Brass Quintet, the Sylvia and Danny Kaye Playhouse, the Great Lakes Performing Artist Associates, the Con Spirito woodwind quintet, the Greater Lansing Symphony Orchestra, the Fromm Music Foundation, the Chamber Music Society of Baltimore, and a joint commission from the American Brass Quintet, the Catskill Brass Quintet, the Mt. Vernon Brass Players, and the Southern Brass quintet (under the National Endowment for the Arts Consortium Commissioning Program). She has also created pieces to fill less formal commissions, including a work for flutist Nina Assimakopoulos’s Laurels Project and one for guitarist Volkmar Zimmermann’s choir plus guitar project. Silverman has also been presented on the Composer's Voice Concert Series by Vox Novus of which she is also a member.

=== Teaching ===
Silverman accepted her first teaching job at the Rochdale Village Community Music Center, teaching children piano, during her senior year of college. After several community music school jobs (teaching piano and theory), private teaching (piano and clarinet) and classes involving movement and music, Silverman began her college teaching career as a Teaching Assistant at Columbia University. She served as adjunct faculty at various branches of the City University of New York before taking her first full-time teaching position at Goucher College (1977–1980) where she taught music theory and other courses. She also taught for several years at the Peabody Institute of The Johns Hopkins University, specializing mainly in 20th-century music history at the graduate level; at the Center for Graduate Studies of the Aspen Music Festival; and at the school of the Alvin Ailey American Dance Center.

She taught music history at Mannes College The New School for Music from 1991–2016, composition, ear training, theory, dictation, and music history electives (including musical theatre) at Mannes’s Extension Division (1995–2016), and general music and music theatre at The Eugene Lang College, The New School for Liberal Arts (2000–2013). Silverman has lectured in Europe and throughout the United States, often as a visiting composer. European engagements have included lectures at Fryderyk Chopin University of Music in Warsaw sponsored by the Maestro Foundation (April 2014), and a lecture to members of the Lithuanian Composers Union and composition students from the Lithuanian Music and Theatre Academy followed by pre-concert talks and a radio interview (May 2009), sponsored by the U.S. State Department, and guest composer at Donne in Musica (4th International festival) held in Fiuggi, Italy (September 1999). In the United States, she has been a visiting composer at the Aspen Music Festival, Capital University, Edinboro University, Indiana State University, the International Women’s Brass Conference, the Philadelphia Arts Alliance, Southern Methodist University, SUCO at Oneonta (1st Festival of Women Composers), Tidewater Festival, University of North Texas, University of Utah and the University of Wisconsin at Madison, to cite a few examples.

=== Performing ===
Silverman originally studied piano because she was told that composers need to be pianists, and reached a professional level that enabled her to record for Westdeutscher Rundfunk (WDR), the German public broadcasting institution based in Cologne. Additionally, she has performed at the International Festival of Experimental Music in Bourges, France; the Library of Congress in Washington, DC; and as soloist with the Brooklyn Philharmonic in New York City. She also provides accompaniment to both singers and instrumentalists.

=== Musical style ===
Silverman concerns herself with the timbral possibilities of instruments, and works with performers learning from their feedback. While many of her works incorporate virtuosity, she generally writes music that is playable, and that players enjoy sharing with audiences. She employs structure to fit the materials of each piece, as in her use of consonant melody in deliberate contrast with dissonance in the orchestral work "Adhesions". Silverman's formative years were steeped in an environment of ethnic Jewish songs and dances, and this rich heritage is reflected in works like her early opera, “The Miracle of Nemirov”, based on a story by Peretz, and a more recent piece for horn and marimba, “Protected Sleep", written for horn player David Jolley.

== Selected writings ==
- "Beethoven Today Would Be Exploring New Forms" Guest Comment. The Evening Sun February 28, 1983)
- "Commissioning a Musical Composition." International Women's Brass Conference Newsletter vol. 1, no. 5 (1994):
- "Gesualdo: Misguided or Inspired?" Current Musicology no. 16 (1973):
- "Otto Luening at 96" The Sonneck Society for American Music Bulletin Vol. XXII, No. 2 Summer 1996: Cover Story
- Record reviews for The Baltimore Sun – Sunday Arts and Entertainment section (1985)
- "Report from New York City: Computer Conference, June 1973." Current Musicology no. 17 (1974):
- "The Gregg Smith Singers." The Goucher Quarterly no. 2 (1978)

NOTE: In addition to these articles, Silverman wrote the 20th-century section of: Leonie Rosenstiel (gen. ed.), The Schirmer History of Music. New York: Schirmer Books, 1982.
