= Craig Hultgren =

American cellist and improvisor

- Occupation: Cellist
- Website: www.alabamasymphony.org/chultgren.htm

Craig Hultgren is an American cellist and improvisor. Hultgren graduated from the University of Iowa and at Indiana University. He has taught at Birmingham-Southern College, the University of Alabama Birmingham and the Alabama School of Fine Arts, as well as teaching privately. Craig Hultgren is a cellist with the Alabama Symphony Orchestra and has been a member of several chamber groups such as the Chagall Trio, the Luna Nova Ensemble, and the Ensemble for contemporary chamber music Thamyris. He is an active performer and performs regularly as a soloist on the cello and e-cello. Hultgren also made a name for himself among improvisational musicians.

"Hultgren, who is no stranger to avant grade music, considers himself an activist for new music" For more than 10 years, Craig Hultgren also organizes his Solo Cello Works Biennial presenting new works from composers around the world. presenting the new works for the cello. "Craig Hultgren has become a magnet for composers seeking first hearings of their cello works." For him, more than 100 works were composed by contemporary composers, including works for the electric cello and multi-media works by Tiffany Benton, Kari Besharse, Noah Creshevsky, J. Nickitas Demos, Brian Moon, Veselin Nikolov, Philip Schuessler, Robert Scott Thompson, and Robert Voisey

He is a member of the New Directions Cello Association, past President of the Birmingham Art Music Alliance and former President of the Birmingham Art Association, where he instituted the Birmingham Improv, an improvisational festival held annually for ten years.

In 2004, the Birmingham Sidewalk Film Festival 48-Hour Short Film Rush cited him for the best soundtrack creation for the film The Silent Treatment.

In 2013, Craig Hultgren participated in Vox Novus's Fifteen Minutes of Fame founded by Robert Voisey "Few performers could, or would, take up such a gauntlet, and he came through admirably" The Fifteen Minutes of Fame set of 15 composers was subtitled Occupy Cello -- Upsetting the Musical Status Quo and cellist Craig Hultgren's performance in Alabama was praised for his "herculean effort to shift styles and sensibilities at a moment's notice"

Hultgren performed at Carnegie Hall for Dorothy Hindman's Retrospective, "played with impressive poise and sensitivity by cellist Craig Hultgren, ... using bystander video from Gray’s arrest for both spoken words and pitch sources. Rough Ride is more abstract and more powerful, the cello line shining and abrading, like fiberglass threads, the fragmented text outlining a sense of tragedy."

== Interviews, Articles and Reviews ==
- Dorothy Hindman’s range of expression on display in retrospective By George Grella, New York Classical Review March 9, 2016 at 12:40 pm
- Cellist Craig Hultgren delivers mixed show, one minute at a time By Michael Huebner, Al.com, May 30, 2013
- Interview of Craig Hultgren on WBHM
- Craig Hultgren's well-earned 15 minutes of fame unfolding at Moonlight on the Mountain in Birmingham By Michael Huebner, AL.com May 21, 2013
- Craig Hultgren again shows skill, dedication to new music at Meet the Composer event in Birmingham By Michael Huebner, The Birmingham News, March 28, 2010
- Atlanta: Breaking Out New Cello Music By Mark Gresham, New Music Box September 20, 2005

== Discography ==
- Music of the Next Moment Released 1996 - Innova Recordings
- Electro-Acoustic Cello Book Living Artist Recordings
