= Liana Alexandra =

Romanian composer, pianist and music educator (1947–2011)

- Born: Liana Moraru; 27 May 1947; Bucharest, Romania
- Died: 10 January 2011 (aged 63)
- Occupation: Composer

Liana Alexandra Șaptefrati (born Liana Moraru; 27 May 1947 – 10 January 2011) was a Romanian composer, pianist, and music educator.

== Biography ==
Alexandra was born in Bucharest, Romania, on 27 May 1947. From 1965 to 1971, she studied at the Ciprian Porumbescu Conservatory (now the National University of Music Bucharest) under Tudor Ciortea and Tiberiu Olah and took composition courses in 1974, 1978, 1980 and 1984 in Darmstadt, Germany. She had a doctorate in musicology and taught composition, orchestration, and music analysis at the Conservatory from 1971 until her death in 2011. A prolific composer in the neoromantic style, Alexandra had over 100 of her works performed and published in Romania. According to musicologist Octavian Cosma, she was "in her element with orchestral and chamber music, employing repetitive and evolving techniques, with melodic lines which suggest lyricism and meditation" and an instrumentation that used "a palette of delicate, pastel colours." Iuliana Porcos described her work as "characterized by a clarity of orchestration and particularly by an evolving repetitive structure which induces a feeling of plenary meditation. Her composing style is defined by simplicity, accessibility and clarity, in accord with the 20th century composers’ wish to approach consonance (a new type of consonance), minimalism and archetype." Her music was associated with the "New Simplicity" movement by revewers of the 1980 Darmstadt Festival, who praised her Incantations II derived "in an original manner from elements of Rumanian folk music".

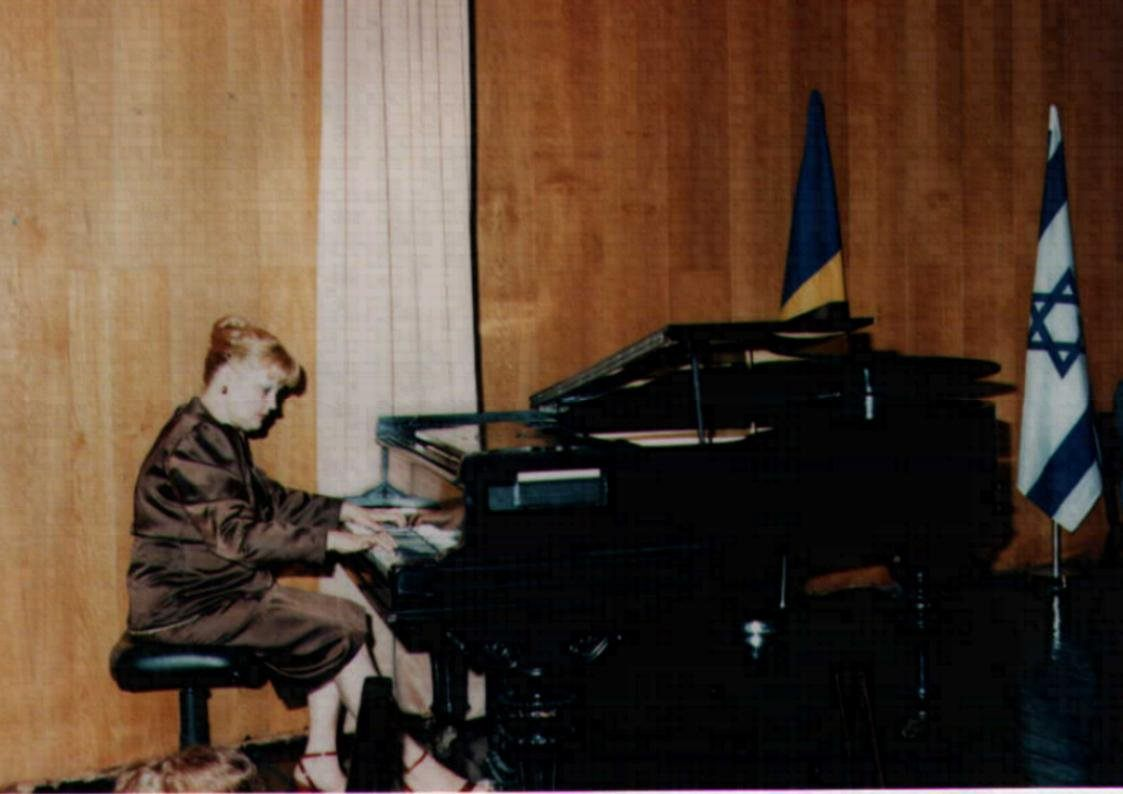
Liana Alexandra, ACMEOR Prize, Tel-Aviv, 1997

Alexandra married the Romanian cellist and composer Şerban Nichifor in 1978. They performed together as Duo Intermedia from 1990 and were co-directors of the Nuova Musica Consonante - Living Music Foundation Festival.

Liana Alexandra died at her home in Bucharest on 10 January 2011 of a cerebral hemorrhage at the age of 63. On 12 January 2011, two days after her death, the broadcast Univers muzical românesc on Radio România Muzical was dedicated to her. In May of that year, Liana Alexandra: Marturii despre muzica ei (Liana Alexandra: Confessions about her Music) was published by Editura Stephanus in a bilingual Romanian and English edition. Edited by Şerban Nichifor, the book is an anthology of writings on Alexandra's music by composers, critics and musicologists including Viorel Cosma, Grete Tartler, Robert Voisey, and Jacques Leduc. Later that month, her 1987 opera În labirint (The Maze) was performed in her memory by the Banatul Philharmonic of Timișoara as the closing concert of the Timișoara International Music Festival (31 May 2011).

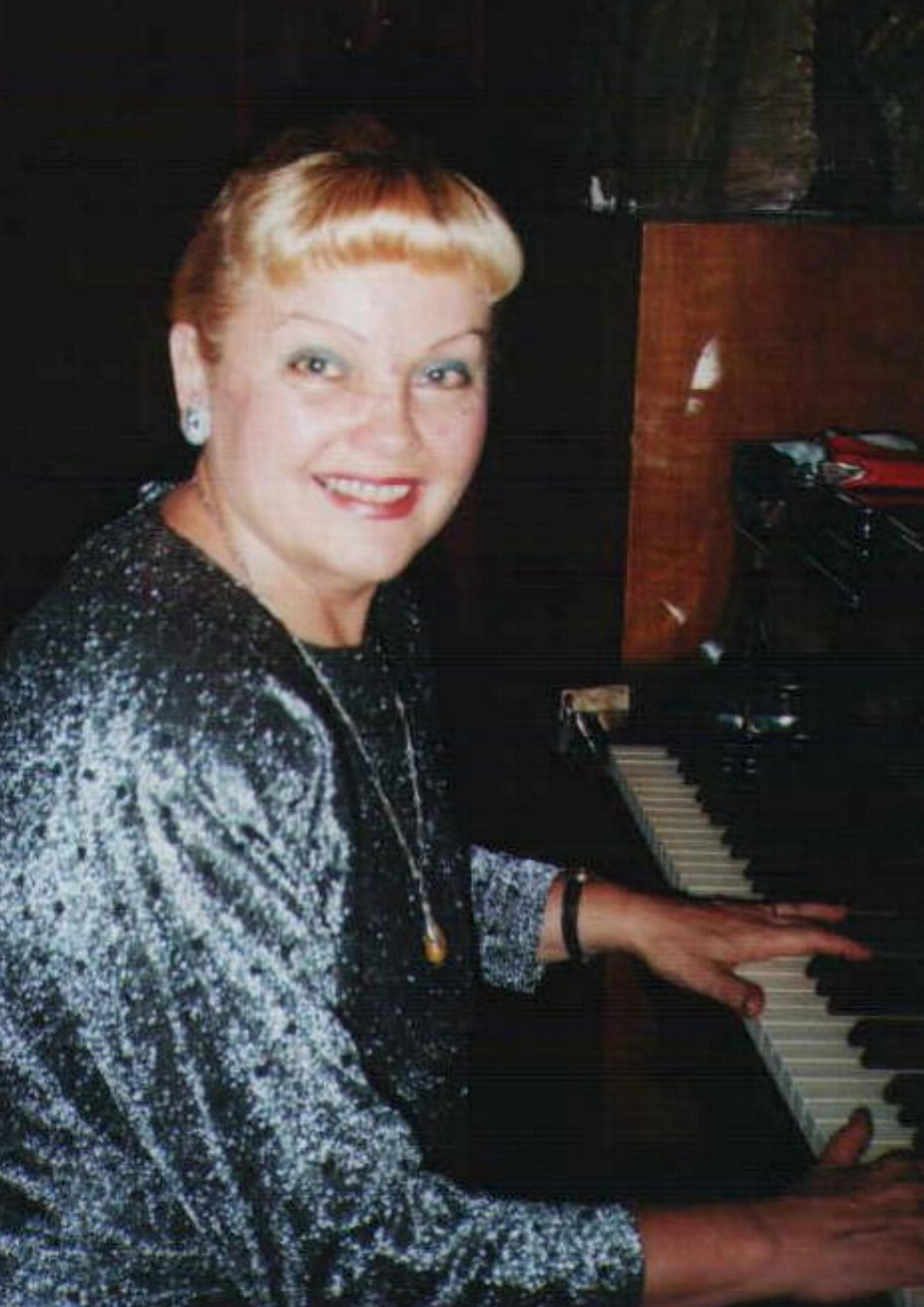
Composer Liana Alexandra playing piano, concert at "International New Music Week" Festival, Bucharest, "George Enescu" Museum, 2002

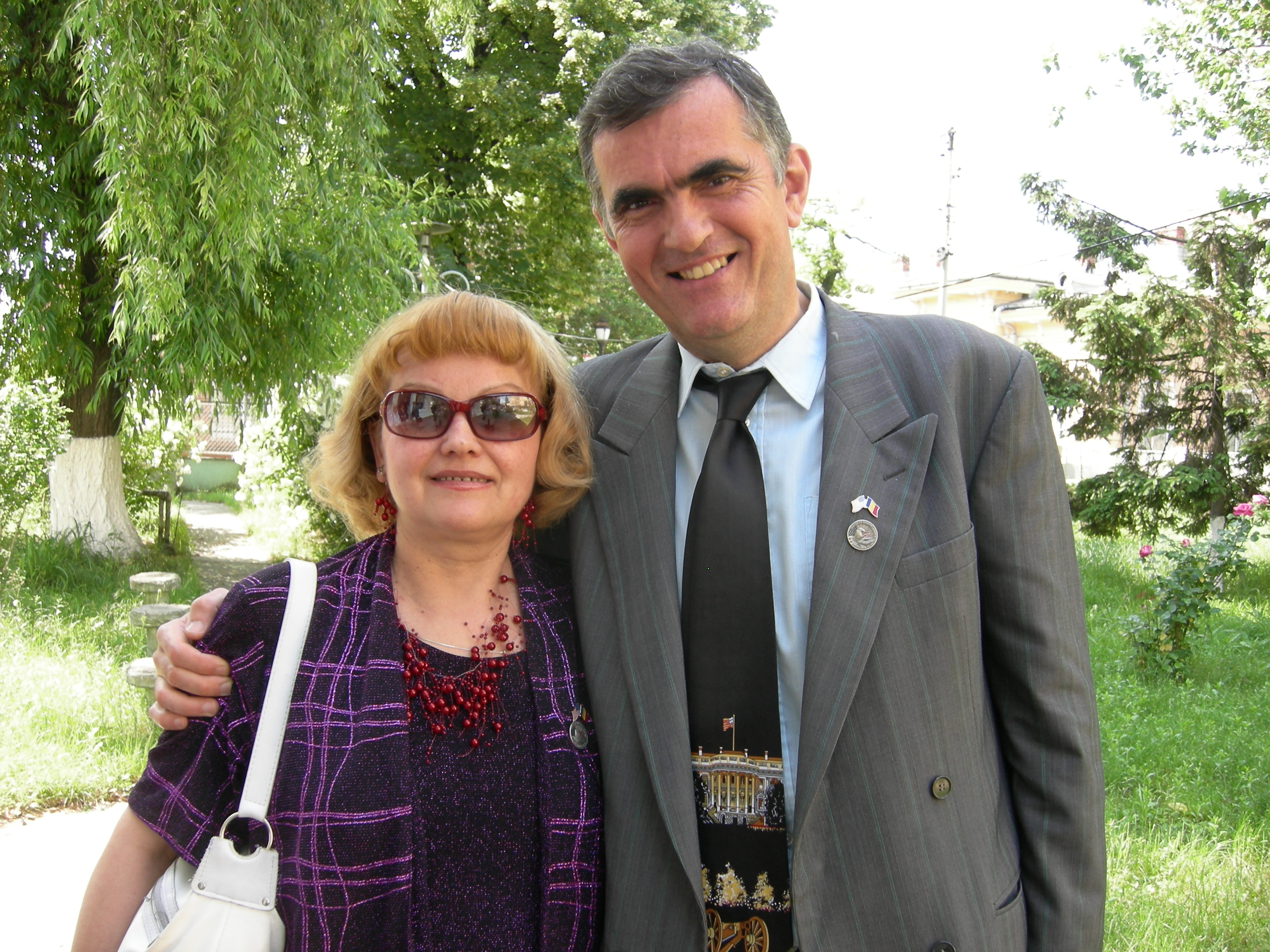
Liana Alexandra and her husband Şerban Nichifor. The couple performed together as Duo Intermedia.

== Prizes and honors ==
Alexandra's compositions have won numerous prizes and honors, including:

- 1975, 1979, 1980, 1982, 1984, 1987, 1988 - Prize of the Union of Romanian Composers
- 1979, 1980 - Gaudeamus Prize
- 1980 - Prize of the Romanian Academy
- 1993 - International Society for Contemporary Music Prize
- 1997 - ACMEOR Prize of Israel

== Selected works ==
Symphonic, vocal-symphonic and concert music

- Symphony I (1971)
- Cantata for women's choir and orchestra, verses by Lucian Blaga (1971)
- "Valences", symphonic movement (1973)
- Concerto for clarinet and orchestra (1974)
- Cantata II for soprano, baritone, mixed chorus and orchestra, verses by Lucian Blaga (1977)
- Cantata III "Country-land, country-idea" for women's chorus and orchestra, verses by Nichita Stanescu (1977)
- Symphony II "Hymns" (1978)
- Concerto for flute, viola and chamber orchestra (1980)
- Symphony III “Diacronies” (1981)
- Symphony IV (1984)
- Symphony V (1985-1986)
- Symphony VI (1988-1989)
- Symphonic poem "Jerusalem" (1990)
- Concerto for string orchestra (1991)
- Concerto for piano for four hands and orchestra (1993)
- Symphony VII (1996)
- Symphony VIII (1995-1996)
- Symphony IX "Jerusalem" (1970)
- Concerto for saxophone and orchestra (1997)
- "Pastorale" for wind orchestra (1999)
- Concerto for organ and orchestra (2002). Premiered at the Mihail Jora Concert Hall, Bucharest, 13 November 2002, with Radio Chamber Orchestra, conducted by Cristian Brancusi and Ilse Maria Reich as organist.
- Computer music (2003) - Bassoon Quartet, Barcarola, Pastorale, Dancing Visions (12 variations), 1 CD
- Computer music (2004) - Rhythms (8 Studies), 1 CD

Opera

- The Snow Queen, children's opera after the story by Hans Christian Andersen (1978)
- În labirint, chamber opera (1987)
- Chant d'amour de la Dame à la Licorne, chamber opera set to verses by Etienne de Sadeleer (1995)

Chamber music

- Sonata for solo flute (1973)
- Music for clarinet, harp and percussion (1972)
- Lyric Sequence for clarinet, trumpet and piano (1974)
- Two sequences for soprano and chamber orchestra (1976)
- "Collages" for brass quintet (1977)
- "Incantations" II for violin, viola, cello and piano (1978)
- "Consonances" I for trombone quartet (1978)
- "Consonances" II for clarinet and piano (1979)
- "Consonances" III for solo organ (1979)
- "Consonances" V for solo organ (1980)
- "Images interrupted" for woodwind quintet (1983)
- "Cadenza" for violin (1983)
- "Pastorale" for bass clarinet and piano (1984)
- "Allegro veloce e caratteristico" for organ (1985)
- Sonata for six horns (1986)
- "Larghetto" for string chamber orchestra (1988)
- "Intersections" - sonata for horn and piano (1989)
- Music for Het Trio (1990)
- "A tre" for flute, clarinet, and bassoon (1991)
- "Cadenza" III for piano (1992)
- Sonata for piano (1993)
- "Fantasy" for cello and piano (1994)
- "Poem for Romania", "Poem for Madona from Neamt" for soprano and piano, texts by Eugen Van Itterbeek (1994)
- "Consonances" VI for recorder quartet (1997)
- "Five movements" for violoncello and piano (1997)
- "Consonances" VII for solo harp (1998)
- "Parallel musics" for saxophone, cello and piano (2001)
- "Incantations" III for cello and tape (2002)

Books

- Componistica muzicală: Un inefabil demers între fantezie şi rigoare (Musical composition: An ineffable act between fantasy and mathematical rigor). Editura Universității Naționale de Muzică, 2005

== Discography ==
Alexandra was a member of the Vox Novus consortium. Several of her compositions for the consortium's 60x60 project appear on:

- 60x60 (2004–2005). Vox Novus VN-001
- 60x60 (2006–2007). Vox Novus VN-002

Her 1981 choral work Soarele Si Luna appears on:

- Contemporary Music IV - music by Paul Constantinescu, Pascal Bentoiu, Liana Alexandra, Laurentiu Profeta, et al. Conducted by Marin Constantin, 1998, re-released 2005. Electrecord 260

Symphonies number 2, “Imnuri”, and number 3, “Diacronii”, were released on Electrecord LP ST-ECE 02183, recorded in 1977, performed by the Romanian Radio & Television Symphony Orchestra, conducted by Iosif Conta and Liviu Ionescu.
