= Kyong Mee Choi =

South Korean musician (born 1971)

- 최경미
- Born: 1971 (age 54–55)
- Education: Ewha Womans University; Seoul National University; Georgia State University; University of Illinois
- Occupation: Musician
- Employer: Roosevelt University
- Awards: Guggenheim Fellowship (2008)

Academic background
- Thesis: Spatial Relationships in Electro-Acoustic Music and Painting (2005)
- Doctoral advisor: Guy Garnett
- Musical career
- Genres: Electroacoustic music
- Label: Ravello Records

Kyong Mee Choi (born 1971) is a South Korean composer based in the United States. A 2008 Guggenheim Fellow, she is currently the Program Director of Music Composition/Music and Computing, and a Professor of Music Composition at Roosevelt University in Chicago.. Choi is also a visual artist, painter, organist and poet, received several prestigious awards and grants including John Simon Guggenheim Memorial Foundation Fellowship, Robert Helps Prize, Aaron Copland Award, John Donald Robb Musical Trust Fund Commission, Illinois Arts Council Fellowship, First prize of ASCAP/SEAMUS Award, Second prize at VI Concurso Internacional de Música Eletroacústica de São Paulo, Honorary Mentions from Musique et d’Art Sonore Electroacoustiques de Bourges, Musica Nova, Society of Electroacoustic Music of Czech Republic, Luigi Russolo International Competition, and Destellos Competition.

== Biography ==
Choi, born in 1971, began her collegiate studies at Ewha Womans University, where she earned her Bachelor of Science in chemistry and science education in 1995 and finished master studies in Korean literature at Seoul National University in 1997. Later, she moved to the United States where she earned both her master of music (1999) and doctor of musical arts degrees (2005) from Georgia State University and the University of Illinois Urbana-Champaign, respectively. Her doctoral dissertation was Spatial Relationships in Electro-Acoustic Music and Painting

In 2008, Choi was awarded a Guggenheim Fellowship for music composition. Among many of her honors are an ASCAP/SEAMUS Award first-place prize, Illinois Arts Council Fellowship, and a John Donald Robb Musical Trust Fund Commission.

Choi was one of the visiting artists at the Richmond Center for Visual Arts in 2013. She was a guest artist at Electronic Music Eastern 2019 at Eastern Illinois University. Choi presented her piano-voice piece "Tao" at the University of Cincinnati - College-Conservatory of Music's 2004 Music04 festival. Her dissertation composition, a piano-percussion piece named "Gestural Trajectory", won her the Robert Helps Prize in 2006 and premiered at the University of South Florida the next year. Michael Huebner of The Birmingham News called the premiere of Choi's piece "Inner Space" one of the highlights of Cello OUT Outside 2009 at Birmingham–Southern College.

Three of Choi's compositions have been released in the Society for Electro-Acoustic Music in the United States's Music from SEAMUS series. Her piece "Tensile Strength", composed with Timothy Ernest Johnson, was included in the compilation album In Celebration of the 50th Anniversary of the University of Illinois Experimental Music Studios (1958-2008). Her opera The Eternal Tao was released by Ravello Records in 2013;. Aucourant Records published her CD, SORI, featuring her eight compositions for solo instrument and electronics. The project was supported by the IAS Artist Project Grant from the Illinois Arts Council.

== Discography ==
Title	Year	Details	Ref.
The Eternal Tao	2013	Released: January 29, 2013; Label: Ravello Records	

=== Other compositions ===
Title	Year	Album	Ref.
"Tensile Strength" (with Timothy Ernest Johnson)	2008	In Celebration of the 50th Anniversary of the University of Illinois Experimental Music Studios (1958-2008)	
"Inner Space" (by Choi herself and Craig Hultgren)	2013	Music from SEAMUS, vol. 22	
"Train of Thoughts" (electronics; by Choi herself)	2019	Music from SEAMUS, vol. 28	
"Flowering Dandelion" (violin; by Sarah Plum)	2023	Music from SEAMUS, vol. 32	
