= George David Kieffer =

American lawyer

George D. Kieffer
- Born: George David Kieffer; November 17, 1947 (age 78); New York City, New York, U.S.
- Education: BA - University of California, Santa Barbara; JD - University of California, Los Angeles
- Occupation: Partner at Manatt, Phelps & Phillips
- Spouse: Judith Kieffer (m. 1983)
- Children: 2 sons

George David Kieffer (born November 17, 1947) is a Los Angeles-based lawyer, author, civic leader and composer. He is a past chair and member of the Board of Regents of the University of California. He is a principal co-author of the Los Angeles City Charter (the city's constitution), adopted in 1999, and led the Mayor's task force in response to 9/11. He is two-time chair of the Board of Directors of the Los Angeles Area Chamber of Commerce. He was named one of the most influential lawyers in California by the Los Angeles and San Francisco Daily Journals in 2000 and 2010 and named by Best Lawyers in America as Los Angeles “Lawyer of the Year” in the practice area of Administrative/Regulatory Law for 2019, 2021 and 2024. The Los Angeles Business Journal named Kieffer among the leaders in its August 2016 inaugural edition of "The Los Angeles 500: The Most Influential People in Los Angeles" and every year since. In 2026, he was honored with the Los Angeles Civic Medal. He is the author of The Strategy of Meetings (c. 1988, Simon and Schuster) and contributing author to Governing Public Colleges and Universities (c. 1993, Jossey-Bass).

== Early life and law career ==
Born in New York City, New York, Kieffer was raised in the San Francisco Bay Area and graduated from Serra High School in San Mateo, California. He received a B.A. in history from the University of California at Santa Barbara in 1969, where he was named the Outstanding Male Graduate upon graduation. He served one year as legislative assistant to Congressman Michael J. Harrington and received a J.D. from UCLA in 1973. During his third year he clerked for Honorable David Bazelon, Chief Judge, U.S. Court of Appeals for the District of Columbia circuit. He joined the law firm of Manatt, Phelps & Rothenberg in 1973 (now Manatt, Phelps & Phillips, LLP).

Kieffer continues to practice law at the Manatt, Phelps & Phillips, LLP law firm office in Los Angeles with a particular emphasis on state and municipal regulatory work. During this work, he was named by The Daily Journal as one of the Top 100 lawyers in California in 2010. He was also awarded by Best Lawyers in America as Los Angeles “Lawyer of the Year” in the practice area of Administrative/Regulatory Law for 2019, 2021 and 2024. Among other honors, he also received the Anti-Defamation League’s Jurisprudence Award in 2013.

== Civic life ==
In 1976, Kieffer became general counsel for the Presidential Campaign of Jerry Brown.

In 1980, then Governor Jerry Brown appointed Kieffer to the Board of Governors of the California Community Colleges, where he served as Chair from 1983 to 1985. He subsequently served on the Blue Ribbon Commission to review the California Master Plan for Higher Education. He served as Chair of the Center for the Study of Democratic Institutions from 1985-1987.

In 1996, then Los Angeles City Attorney James Hahn appointed Kieffer to the Los Angeles Charter Reform Commission, charged with rewriting the Los Angeles City Charter. Kieffer was subsequently elected chair of the commission. The story of the drafting and voter adoption of the new city charter is recounted in The City at Stake: Succession, Reform, and the Battle for Los Angeles by Professor Raphael J. Sonenshein (ISBN 978-0691126036). In 1999, Kieffer was awarded the Social Responsibility Award by the Los Angeles Urban League. Following the events of 9/11, then Mayor Hahn asked Kieffer to head the Economic Impact Task Force charged with recommending steps to minimize the economic effects of 9/11 on business in Los Angeles; the report became the blueprint for City Council and Mayoral response.

In 2003 Kieffer was selected as the Chairman of the Board of the Los Angeles Area Chamber of Commerce and served two terms in that position. Kieffer expanded the board to include as ex officio members the leaders of previously underrepresented ethnic organizations as well as competing business organizations and recruited other significant civic and business leaders to the board of directors. In 2003, the Los Angeles Area Chamber of Commerce was the only business organization in the state to oppose the recall of Governor Gray Davis one year after his re-election on the principled ground that it was a misuse of the recall process.

During the California governorships of Arnold Schwarzenegger and Jerry Brown, Kieffer was president of the Governor's Residence Foundation, a private non-profit which pays for the governor's housing in Sacramento.

Kieffer is the author of The Strategy of Meetings (c. 1988 Simon and Schuster). He was contributing author to Governing Public Colleges and Universities (c. 1993 Jossey-Bass).

Kieffer has served on numerous boards and commissions, including the Constitutional Rights Foundation, the Los Angeles Chamber of Commerce, Vice Chairman of the Los Angeles Urban League, co-founder of FuturePorts, and founder and chair of the Los Angeles Civic Alliance. He has been recognized with the Public Service Award from the Pat Brown Institute at California State University, Los Angeles; the Spirit of Excellence Award from the Los Angeles Biomedical Research Institute; the Social Responsibility Award from the Los Angeles Urban League; and the Crystal Eagle Award for Public Service from Coro Southern California in 2012. In 2026, he was honored with the Los Angeles Civic Medal.

== University of California Board of Regents ==
In 2009, Governor Schwarzenegger appointed Kieffer to the Board of Regents of the University of California with a term that runs to March, 2021. In July 2017, he was elected as chair of the board. As Chair Kieffer guided the Board through a difficult period following the UC President Janet Napoltiano's interference with a State Audit; Kieffer publicly admonished the President on behalf of the Board, but the two subsequently worked in close partnership to increase enrollment and restore funding from the state legislature. Kieffer also entered into a unique partnership with students and legislators to reduce tuition for the first time in many years. Throughout his term on the board, Kieffer championed a new student center in Sacramento. The new University of California Student and Policy Center was opened in August of 2023. On March 14, 2018, while serving as chair and while the university was in the middle of labor negotiations, labor activists accused Kieffer of conflicts of interest at a University of California Board of Regents meeting. They noted that Kieffer voted for a policy change incentivizing employees to opt-out of the traditional UC retirement system in favor of UC's 403(b) program administered by Fidelity Investments, even though Fidelity was a client of Kieffer's law firm. They also noted Kieffer voted in favor of a controversial new payroll system developed by Oracle, another client. Kieffer responded that although Regents voted on the changes, they did not vote on the vendor contracts. In November 2019, Kieffer was publicly accused of groping by a UC graduate student. The alleged incident occurred in 2014 during a meeting with student leaders at which Kieffer purchased alcohol for students. On June 8, 2020, the University of California cleared Regent George Kieffer of allegations of sexual misconduct, finding insufficient evidence to support a graduate student’s claim.

== Life as a composer ==
Throughout his professional and civic career, Kieffer has composed music, first as a young singer-songwriter, but subsequently including a wide variety of film/television, solo piano, and orchestral music. He wrote music for both of Steve Martin's The Pink Panther films, Billy: The Early Years, Rebound, episodes of the T.V. show Fame, and more.

On the classical side, George David Kieffer’s work “Responders” written for the West Point Band was selected for Fifteen-Minutes-of-Fame to be presented at a 15 year memorial concert for the attacks of September 11. His composition, "Arlington", debuted in 2014 with the Gulf Coast Symphony Orchestra. In 2015 he added lyrics and the piece was released on YouTube with the lyrics sung by the Los Angeles Master Chorale. Additionally, his "Fanfare For The Special Olympics" debuted with the Special Olympics in 2015. That piece was later recorded with the City of Prague Philharmonic Orchestra, along with many other orchestral works. This became The Ambassador's Wife and Other Stories, released in September 2021 by Navona Records. As put by Cinemusical's Steven Kennedy, "[The Ambassadors Wife has] a great sense of romantic musical language, strong thematic writing, and often witty orchestral writing".

Kieffer also has a large catalogue of released and unreleased music for solo piano. His debut album, Encounters With the Moon, was nominated for SoloPiano.com's Best “Contemporary and Modern” Album of 2019. Since then, he has released a constant stream singles, each with their own character and unique voice. These works for solo piano have been performed internationally, most recently in multiple Chinese cities by Russian pianist Angela Cholakyan. In 2023 Kieffer released his second solo piano album, Piano Songs: Solo Piano Vol. II.

Most of his catalogue can be found at www.georgedavidkieffer.com.

== Honors and awards ==
- Top 100 lawyers in California – SF Daily Journal and LA Daily Journal, 2000 and 2010.
- Crystal Eagle Award for Public Service, Coro Southern California, 2012.
- Anti-Defamation League Jurisprudence Award, 2013.
- 500 most influential people in LA – LA Business Journal, 2016, 2017, 2018, 2019, 2020, 2021, 2022.
