= Construction Company Theatre/Dance Associates =

Construction Company Theatre/Dance Associates, also known as Dance Under Construction, is a non-profit dance and art group in the Chelsea neighborhood of New York City. It was found in 1972 by Sally Bowden, Barbara Gardner, and Carolyn Lord.

Choreographers who have worked with Construction Company include Carolyn Lord, Marjorie Gamso, Sally Silvers, Bryan Hayes, Scott Caywood, Sally Gross, Christopher Caines, Rachel Cohen, Beth Leonard, Rebekah Windmiller, Mei-Yin Ng, Elke Rindfleisch, Ariane Anthony, Jeff Bauer, Beth Soll, and Tomoko Aoki.

A separate initiative "Music Under Construction" was launched in 1993 and has premiered numerous works in chamber settings often together with new choreography. Composers active in this initiative include Faye-Ellen Silverman, Wendy Griffiths, Thomas Addison, David Tcimpidis, Chris Woltman, Nathaniel Drake, and Carolyn Lord. Performers who have also curated concerts of new music include Theresa Salomon, Marc Peloquin and Kathryn Woodard.

Since 2008 The Construction Company has partnered with University Settlement on the Lower East Side as its primary performance venue.
