= Vox Novus =

New York City-based organization

Vox Novus is a New York City-based organization consisting of composers, musicians, and music enthusiasts that presents and supports new music. Vox Novus was founded by Robert Voisey to promote contemporary composers in 2000.

This organization was created for the purposes of expanding the presence of contemporary music in the public's vision, empowering composers and contemporary musicians to create, produce, and promote their music. Vox Novus does this by the production of concerts, exposure on the Internet, opportunity offerings, and networking between professionals. Vox Novus promotes and produces contemporary music using repeatable methods and models that composers can take and use on their own. This way, contemporary music can reach an ever wider audience,e thereby continuing the advancement of culture and art.

Vox Novus has produced and promoted more than 500 concerts in over 30 countries around the world. The organization is most noted for its 60x60 project, the Composer's Voice Concert Series, and Fifteen-Minutes-of-Fame music project. Vox Novus has several other project endeavors such as Contemporary Quartets, Contemporary Recordings, Circuit Bridges, and xMV.

Vox Novus supports many other new music projects through its advocacy. It has engaged in several endeavors to promote and empower composers and their music in presentations of the greater cultural community.

One example is to produce a call for scores of new works written to celebrate the West Point Band's bicentennial for a concert in honor of Armed Forces Day. Another project is a concert of music by living Armenian composers to commemorate the Armenian genocide centennial.

It is also known for its resources for composers: Composers' Site, Music Avatar, NM421, and the American Composer Timeline.

In 2015, Vox Novus celebrated its 15th anniversary with a festival that included all of the concert series it produced: 60x60, Composer's Voice Concert Series, Fifteen-Minutes-of-Fame, Circuit Bridges, and xMV. Two Composer's Voice concerts with Fifteen-Minutes-of-Fame took place at Symphony Space in New York City.

== Performance Programs ==
=== 60x60 ===
60x60 is an artistic project comprising 60 one-minute performances. The project commemorates its origins each year by producing a one-hour electroacoustic/acousmatic music concert. 60x60 has been presented in venues and festivals throughout the world. 60x60 has also collaborated with dance and video.

Since its inception in 2003, 60x60 has presented and promoted the works of thousands of composers in more than 50 mixes. Collaborating in many different media formats such as video and dance, 60x60 has been presented hundreds of performances in more than 40 countries and has been presented in venues such as the Winter Garden Atrium in New York City, Stratford Circus in London, the Contemporary Art Museum of Chicago, and HEC-TV in St Louis.

The project has received critical acclaim from New York Times, Time Out (magazine), as well as other publications throughout the globe.

=== Composer's Voice concert series ===
The Composer's Voice Concert Series is a chamber concert series produced primarily in New York City. Started in 2001, the concert series was nomadic and presented in several locations in New York City,y including: Elebash Hall, Collective Unconscious, Under St. Marks, and South Oxford Space in Brooklyn. "On the whole, the programming for this chamber concert demonstrated that Vox Novus, with its beautifully appointed and acoustically pleasing chamber salon, offers a significant venue just a short distance from the Brooklyn Academy of Music for the presentation of serious works by established and emerging composers. Those voices should be heard, and they can even be reheard on the Vox Novus website that generously offers complete audio recordings and even full scores of works presented by Vox Novus at its concerts."

From 2007 to 2015, the concert series was co-produced with the Remarkable Theater Brigade at Jan Hus Church on the Upper East Side in New York City. Concerts at Jan Hus were presented on a monthly basis and bi-weekly since 2011.

Since 2016, Composer's Voice concerts have been held at The Firehouse Space in Brooklyn.

Besides New York City, Composer's Voice has been presented in collaboration with other organizations for performances in Birmingham, Alabama; Buenos Aires, Argentina; Boston, Massachusetts; Rio de Janeiro, Brazil; as well as Bucharest and Constanta in Romania. The series has presented over 100 performances.

The series presented works by several notable composers performed by performance groups throughout the world.

Another remarkable example of support and encouragement of current composers is Vox Novus, an enterprise created by Robert Voisey. Of the many things that Vox Novus does, its Composer's Voice Concert Series brings works directly to the public. To maximize the number of composers whose works can be heard, Mr. Voisey has ingeniously created a portion of many of the concerts entitled 15-Minutes-of-Fame.

— Jim Fogle

=== Fifteen-Minutes-of-Fame ===
Fifteen-Minutes-of-Fame is a music project that contains fifteen one-minute works by different composers and performed by various musicians. This project was originated by Vox Novus, which called for, collected, selected, and presented 15 varied one-minute acoustic miniatures. The fifteen selections are composed for a specific artist or chamber ensemble and then debuted on the Composer's Voice Concert Series. The project seeks one-minute music miniatures from composers working in any style and aesthetic. Este concepto de las miniaturas se ajusta muy bien a nuestra 'era del zapping', 'This concept of miniatures fits very well with our 'age of zapping''.

A call for scores is announced, and 15 pieces are chosen from the works submitted. The works are then performed on the Composer's Voice Concert Series in New York City. The concept started at a celebratory concert in 2009 for the birthday of Robert Voisey, the founder of Vox Novus and the 60x60 project.

The 15 Minutes of Fame project of Vox Novus is a godsend. It organizes competitions whereby ensembles commission worldwide calls for submissions of approximately one-minute pieces, and then select their fifteen favorites for premieres. The players, themselves emerging and without the funds for a traditional commission fee, get original works to present, while the likewise emerging composers get a chance for exposure and a premiere for minimal effort and commitment.

— Seth Gilman, New York Music Culture Examiner

The presentation of fifteen works in a short time allows works of many composers who would not normally be included in a chamber concert to be played. "The brief time limit is also a catalyst for experimentation: when the pressure is off to develop or sustain a composition the pressure is on to make what little time you have very interesting."

==== Musicians ====
Fifteen-Minutes-of-Fame allows the interpreter to have many one-minute miniatures specifically written for them. This is done through a call by Vox Novus for works, sent to composer contacts around the world. A selection process ensues at the call deadline, and the musician chooses fifteen works as a set to perform. It gives the musician an opportunity to pick from a variety of aesthetics and styles written by different composers that they have never met before.

Musicians who have participated in Fifteen Minutes of Fame include Admiral Launch Duo, Austin Mandolin Orchestra, Rodrigo Baggio, Bruce Curlette, Shiau-uen Ding, Oren Fader, Beth Griffith, Kenji Haba, Craig Hultgren, Conway Kuo, Cornelia PetroiuPiano Pinnacle, Jenny Ribeiro, Alyssa Reit, Peter Reit,Juan Maria Solare, SoundProof Mary Beth Orr, Thomas Piercy, Claudine Hickman, Alice Jones, Poné Ensemble, Alex Sramek, West Point Woodwind Quintet, New Thread Quartet, Sophia Yan, West Point Band, WestvPoint Woodwind Quintet, and Zentripetal.

Shiau-uen Ding premiered the first official Fifteen-Minutes-of-Fame on March 27, 2011. Sophia Yan performed the first Fifteen-Minutes-of-Fame with selection from composers under the age of fifteen. The participants selected for the concert ranged in age from 3 to 15 years old. One of the composers selected, Emma Liddle, age 13, was profiled in The Bloomington Crow for her participation in the Fifteen Minutes of Fame selection.

Craig Hultgren's performance was praised for his "herculean effort to shift styles and sensibilities at a moment's notice." Fifteen-Minutes-of-Fame presented an anthology of one-minute pieces, written for the Poné Ensemble, that whet the appetite with mini-samples of a cornucopia of their talent, tastes and styles. - James F Cotter, Times Herald-Record April 29, 2014

For the fifteenth anniversary of 9/11, the West Point Band premiered fifteen one-minute works that honor the contributions of those men and women at Trinity Church in New York City. The following 15 composers’ works represent this Fifteen-Minutes-of-Fame for this performance include: James Anderson, David Avshalomov, Sy Brandon, Steve Cohen, Harrison J. Collins, Cindi Hsu, Nicholas Ryan Kelly, George David Kieffer, Alan Kinningham, Anthony O'Toole, David R. Peoples, James Peterson, Bradley Sampson, Richard G. Smith, and R. Andrew Yates.

===== Awards =====
In 2026, Mary Beth Orr was named a National Finalist for the Ernst Bacon Memorial Award for the Performance of American Music, presented by The American Prize, in the professional soloist and composer division. Orr was recognized in the Horn & Voice category. Her album The Singing Horn, released by Big Round Records on March 7, 2025, is a 26-track album featuring Orr on French horn and voice.

==== Composers ====
Fifteen-Minutes-of-Fame gives composers the opportunity to have their work performed by musicians looking to promote new music. While a constraint, the one-minute miniature format allows for the composer to write a short composition with greater ease than a longer work. Fifteen Minutes of Fame encourages experimentation and opportunities to write for instrumentation that is not commonly available. With fifteen works being selected and the frequency with which Fifteen Minutes of Fame is produced, it is a resource for composers to have their work played and receive exposure.

The one-minute miniatures for Fifteen-Minutes-of-Fame are written by composers from all over the globe. Fifteen Minutes of Fame has presented more than 100 composers including Máté Balogh, Dennis Bathory-Kitsz, Joshua Barlage, John Bilotta, Scott Brickman, Carson Cooman, Salim Dada, Emma Lou Diemer, Bobby DeLisle, Matthew Van Dongen, Moritz Eggert, Francesco Di Fiore, Arthur Gottschalk, Emma Liddel, David Morneau, Serban Nichifor, James Soe Nyun, Michael Mikulka, Nova Pon, Nolan Stolz, Edward Strauman, Martin Watt, and David Wolfson.

=== Contemporary Quartets ===
The Contemporary Quartets Project is a new music production project born in the middle of the COVID pandemic. The idea is to find composers who are interested in producing the quartets that they have created and then have a live recording made online. Starting in 2021, Vox Novus, in conjunction with Virtual Concert Halls, brought this new way to produce contemporary String Quartets to composers around the world. Contemporary Quartets produces and presents the compositions of living composers. The project currently features the talents of the Argus Quartet, Lehner String Quartet, and RUSQUARTET.

=== Circuit Bridges ===
Circuit Bridges is an electro-acoustic concert series designed to present and promote electro-acoustic music. The series does this by creating "bridge" concerts between communities, organizations, or ensembles. "The heart of our mission is to connect electronic music composers and communities and share our music." Circuit Bridges is dedicated to highlighting the community of electroacoustic music creators."

=== XMV eXperimental Music Video ===
XMV was an experimental music video night hosted in New York with Collective:Unconscious XMV was designed to present artists experimenting with video and music; from shorts to features, from psychedelic to abstract imagery, from minimalism to edgy pop, and even live performances and dynamic video.

== Resources for Composers ==
=== Composers' Site ===
Composers' Site is a free online database of composer opportunities. It allows for composers to quickly and efficiently search for opportunities like contests, competitions, residencies, and calls-for-works. Composers can also sign up for the mailing list to receive notifications on new and expiring opportunities.

=== Music Avatar ===
Music Avatar is an online tool to accept, process, and judge music submissions online. Vox Novus uses Music Avatar to process submissions for its Fifteen-Minutes-Minutes-of-Fame, Composer's Voice Concert Series, Circuit Bridges, and 60x60. Music Avatar is also used by the greater music community for its calls: such as the Society of Composers, Inc and Armenian General Benevolent Union (AGBU) The Music Avatar was instrumental in administering "The Sayat Nova International Composition Competition" run by the Armenian General Benevolent Union (AGBU).

A collaborative project with a call for scores of new works written to celebrate the West Point Band's bicentennial for a concert in honor of Armed Forces Day. Composer's Voice and the West Point Band present the World Premiere of selected works from our call-for-scores: "Celebrating 200 Years of the West Point Band with New Music". These premieres are part of the West Point Band's "Armed Forces Day Concert." The selected works to be premiered by the West Point Band on the 2:00 pm, May 21, 2017 “Armed Forces Day” concert at the Eisenhower Hall Theatre at West Point, were: 'Bicentennial Variations' by Christopher Lowry, 'Generations' by Scott Rodeheaver, and 'West Point' by Phil Taylor.

=== American Composer Timeline ===
The American Composer Timeline was Vox Novus' first contemporary music initiative. Its purpose was to highlight the tradition of composition in the United States from its very first beginnings of the formation of the colonies until contemporary times. It boasts more than 1300 composer listings with links to their biographies and more detailed information.

== Articles & reviews ==
- Vox Novus and the Sonic Journey at Queens New Music Festival by Angela Paulette - Published by Instituto Anemos on 2 de maio de 2026
- The Transformative Power of Concerts: A Journey Through Sound by Angela Paulette - Published by Instituto Anemos on 4 de fevereiro de 2026
- Fifteen minutes of fame comes to the AllArtWorks Viewing Studio The Shelley Irwin show Published January 23, 2024 at 10:10 AM EST WGVU NEWS
- Concert showcases experimental music by Sabrina Hayes - The MSU Exponent, February 26, 2015
- Austin Mandolin Orchestra Premieres 15 New Pieces By Joel Hobbs Mandolin Cafe - February 1, 2015 - 1:15 pm
- Almost surreal atmosphere Gefle Dagblad, Gävle - July 8, 2013 09:00
- Craig Hultgren's well-earned 15 minutes of fame unfolding at Moonlight on the Mountain in Birmingham By Michael Huebner, AL.com, May 21, 2013
- D.M. composer's 60-second work receives New York premiere by Michael Morain, Des Moines Register Jul 13, 2012
- A Parhelion sighting in Queens, Part 2 - Seth Gilman, New York Music Culture Examiner
- Seleccionados los 15 tangos en miniatura para Juan Solare en Bremen Argentina Es Tango, July 10, 2012
- 13-Year-Old Composer is Chosen for Fifteen Minutes of Fame By Gina Szafraniec, The Bloomington Crow September 1, 2011
- Omtumlande internationell timme By Camilla Dal, Gefle Dagblad - March 25, 2009 at 8:39 am
- Gone in 60 Minutes: Electronic Compositions Showcased at NC State University, Alexandra Jones, "Classical Voice in North Carolina", October 1, 2007.
- WRITERS' BLOCK, Chris Pasles, Los Angeles Times, July 22, 2007
- Time and Motion, Anne Cammon, "Fly Global Music Culture", May 26, 2007
- 60x60 Project presents 60 composers in 60 minutes, Rachel Slade, North Texas Daily February 28, 2007 Accessed May 1, 2007
- October 20, 2002 Composer's Voice Concert, John de Clef Pineiro, New Music Connoisseur, March 2003 Vol.11 No.1
- "El argentino Solare promueve la expansión del tango más allá de sus fronteras", Carlos Gallardo Ruig, ExpressNews Nr. 645, London, August 2012.
