= Ingolf =

Ingolf is a masculine given name, that has its roots in Germanic mythology. The first part "Ing" refers to the Germanic god Yngvi, the second part means "wolf". It may refer to:

- Count Ingolf of Rosenborg (born 1940), member of the Danish royal family
- Ingolf Elster Christensen (1872–1943), Norwegian politician
- Ingolf Dahl (1912–1970), German-born American composer, pianist, conductor and educator
- Ingolf U. Dalferth (born 1948), German philosopher and theologian
- Ingolf Davidsen (1893–1946), Norwegian gymnast
- Ingolf Gabold (1942–2025), Danish composer
- Ingolf Lindau (born 1942), Swedish physicist and professor
- Ingolf Lück (born 1958), German actor, comedian and television host
- Ingolf Mork (born 1947), Norwegian ski jumper
- Ingolf E. Rasmus (1902–1996), American politician and lawyer
- Ingolf Rød (1889–1963), Norwegian sailor
- Ingolf Rogde (1911–1978), Norwegian actor
- Ingolf Schanche (1877–1954), Norwegian actor and theatre director
- Ingolf Håkon Teigene (1949–2007), Norwegian journalist
- Ingolf Wiegert (born 1957), former East German handball player
- Ingolf Wunder (born 1985), Austrian pianist
- Ingolf Vogeler, a character in the Emberverse series of science fiction novels by S. M. Stirling, first appearing in The Sunrise Lands
