= HDMS Ingolf =

HDMS Ingolf has been used as a name for three ships of the Royal Danish Navy:

- HDMS Ingolf (1876), a steam gunboat, launched in 1876 and decommissioned in 1926.
- HDMS Ingolf (1933), a fisheries inspection ship, launched in 1933, seized by the Kriegsmarine in 1943 and sunk in Kiel in an Allied air raid.
- HDMS Ingolf (F350), a Hvidbjornen-class offshore patrol frigate, launched in 1962 and decommissioned in 1991.
