= The Tribeca Trib =

American newspaper

- Type: Monthly newspaper
- Owner(s): Tribeca Trib, Inc.
- Founder(s): Carl Glassman and April Koral
- Founded: 1994; 32 years ago
- Ceased publication: July 2015 (print)
- Language: English
- City: New York City
- Country: United States
- OCLC number: 31495034
- Website: www.tribecatrib.com

The Tribeca Trib is a monthly newspaper and website covering Lower Manhattan in New York City, US.

Named after the community where it started, the Tribeca Trib covers all Manhattan neighborhoods below Canal Street, including Battery Park City, the Financial District, the Seaport/Civic Center and TriBeCa. Its monthly print edition is available in stores, banks, restaurants, residential buildings and distribution boxes in Lower Manhattan; an online version is updated throughout the month

== History ==
Carl Glassman, a photojournalist and writer, had long harbored a fantasy to take over a small-town newspaper. In September 1994, he and his wife April Koral, a freelance writer, founded the Tribeca Trib. The couple had moved to the Lower Manhattan neighborhood in 1979. In the beginning, Glassman served as sole reporter, photographer and layout person while Koral sold ads and oversaw production. For the first issues, they also delivered the paper themselves, using a borrowed van.

The paper’s circulation grew from 7,000 to 15,000 and expanded its coverage to include much of Lower Manhattan below Canal Street, including the Financial District, Battery Park City, and the South Street Seaport and Civic Center areas. Over the years it has garnered many awards from the National Newspaper Association and New York Press Association, including the NNA's highest award, for General Excellence, in 2009. It has also been recognized for its coverage of the Lower Manhattan community after the September 11 attacks. The New York Times called it "the newspaper that has long helped make a community out of the neighborhood."

By 1996, the paper was being quoted in The New York Times and the New York Daily News. Since, it has also been quoted by the New York Post, New York Magazine, The Washington Post, and The Christian Science Monitor.
