= Christian McLeer =

American classical composer

Christian McLeer, an American composer, is a graduate of the Juilliard Conservatory Pre-College and the Manhattan School of Music. At the age of fourteen, he received his first major commission for the American Cancer Society, for which he wrote and performed Hope in concert. Since then, he has composed a number of works that have been commissioned and recorded, including his one-act opera House of Comedy, an avant-garde piece entitled Feedback Parade, the ballet The Grandfather Clocks, and the opera Haibo. His composition Musing is included on acclaimed flutist Sophia Anastasia's CD of the same name, and Hope is included on the CD Encores 2 by the world-renowned pianist Anna Marie Bottazzi. His work, Black Lung, was included in the 60x60 project. As a concert pianist, Christian has performed at many respected venues, including Weill-Carnegie Hall, Steinway Hall, Merkin Concert Hall, and the New Orleans Astrodome. He has also performed as a conductor with the New Music Consort. As an accomplished classical, jazz, pop, and rock musician, he is recognized as having the ability to unite these genres in his compositions. He co-founded the Remarkable Theater Brigade and is the musical director at Jan Hus Presbyterian Church. He is currently a high school chorus teacher.

== Discography ==
- Requiem
- Encores 2
- Musing
