= Richard Zarou =

Richard Zarou (born 1981) is a contemporary composer of concert and film music and the host of the new music podcast "No Extra Notes". Zarou is from Centreville, VA and completed his undergraduate studies at Shenandoah University in Virginia. He completed his Master of Music degree in music composition at Florida State University in 2006 and completed his Doctor of Musical Arts degree in music composition, again at Florida State University, in December 2008.

Zarou's concert music has been featured on a number of festivals and concerts both in the US and abroad. His work "Catatonic Visions of a Spring-Loaded Case" for bass trombone and CD was premiered by Jonathan Warburton and has received several performances both in the US and in the UK since its 2008 premiere. Zarou has also been programmed on the national conference of the Society of Composers, Inc., the College Music Society's 50th anniversary concert program, the prestigious Electronic Music Midwest festival, Florida International University's FEASt FEST, and the Delta State University's Electroacoustic Juke Joint, among many others.

As a film composer, Richard Zarou has worked with a number of professional and student filmmakers. Perhaps his most significant contribution was to the 2007 documentary Breaking the Silence: Torture Survivors Speak Out, a film by Terry Coonan and Vallerie Richard Auzenne in collaboration with the torture victim advocacy group TASSC.

Zarou is perhaps best known for his electroacoustic compositions including his recent album-length release "In From the Rain". His music, particularly his electroacoustic works, is characterized by a vibrant energy, often process-oriented organization, and a clear focus on emotional impact. Zarou has worked with a number of musicians including bass trombonists Jonathan Warburton (UK) and Aaron Misenheimer, cellist Katie Geeseman, flutist Barbi Risken, pianist Martin Levicky (Czech Republic), mezzo-soprano Sarah Horick, and the Eppes String Quartet, among many others. Richard Zarou was also the first composer to receive a commission for a new work for the Loudon County String Orchestra which was premiered in January 2009.
