= Șerban Nichifor =

Romanian composer, cellist and music educator (born 1954)

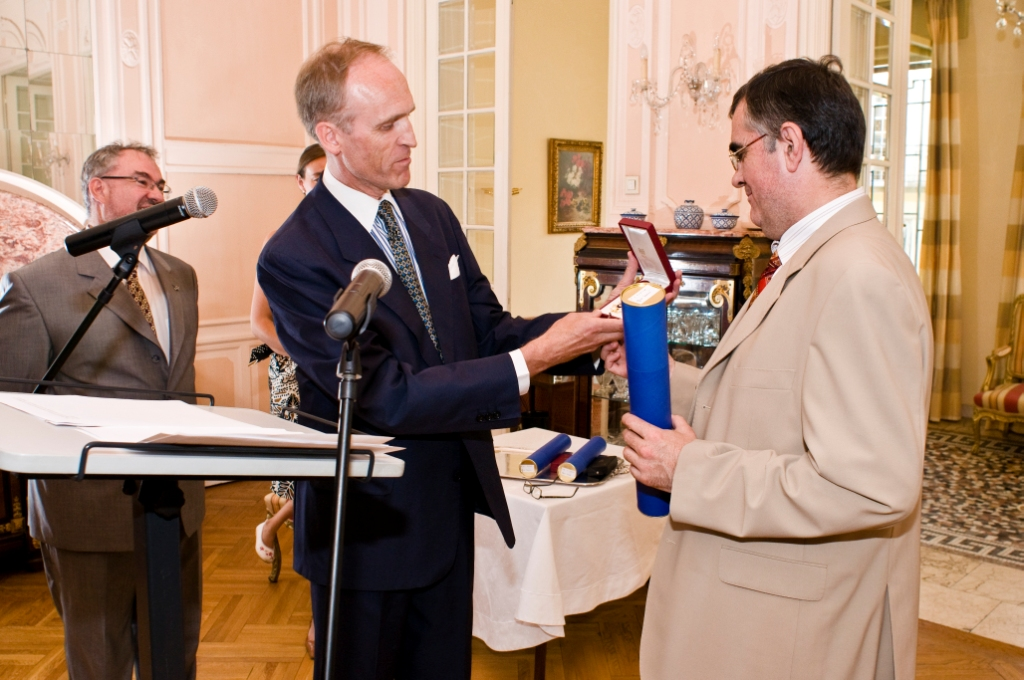
Belgian Ambassador Philippe Roland presenting Șerban Nichifor with the Order of the Crown in 2008

Șerban Nichifor OCB (born 25 August 1954) is a Romanian composer, cellist and music educator.

== Biography ==
Șerban Nichifor was born on 25 August 1954 to Ermil Nichifor (1916–1997) and Livia Nichifor, née Balint (1922–2017) in Bucharest, Romania. Both his parents were physicians. His father was also a musician and conductor of the Orchestra of Physicians in Bucharest.

Nichifor studied at the National University of Music Bucharest from 1973 to 1977 and took composition courses in 1978, 1980 and 1984 in Darmstadt, Germany. In 1994, he received a Ph.D. in Musicology from National University of Music and from 1990 to 1994, also studied at the Theology Faculty of the University of Bucharest. In 2015, he was awarded a PhD summa cum laude in conducting, and wrote a thesis SHOAH – The Holocaust Reflected in My Musical Creation.

He has composed many works dedicated to the victims of The Holocaust. According to musicologist Octavian Cosma, Nichifor's eclectic style is based on neoromanticism but has included elements of jazz (in his Third and Fourth Symphonies) and the use of tape recordings as in his opera Domnişoara Cristina. In the 1990s, he "developed a simplified style employing themes reminiscent of Byzantine chant."

Music of Șerban Nichifor is performed by leading musicians from all around the world. In February 2022, the Russian premiere of his work "Cries from Earth to Heaven" performed by Anastasia Vedyakova and Anastasia Bykova, took place.

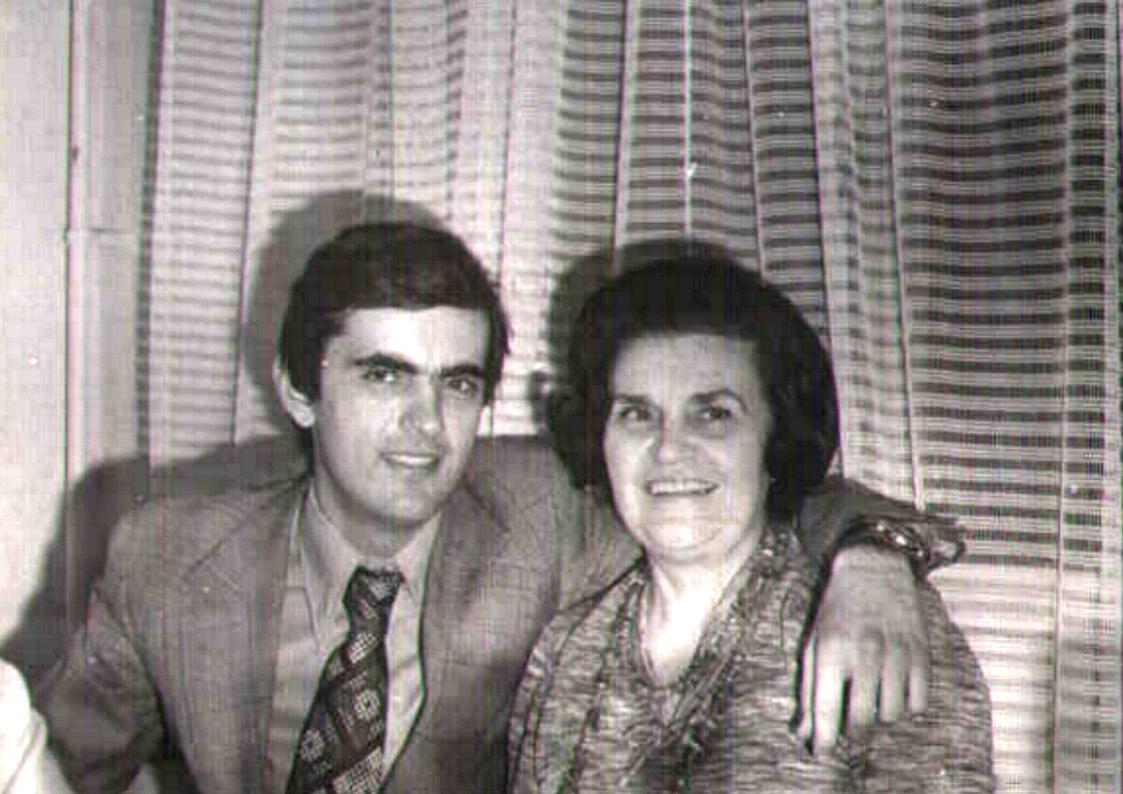
Nichifor and his mother, Dr. Livia Nichifor, to whom he dedicated much of his musical output

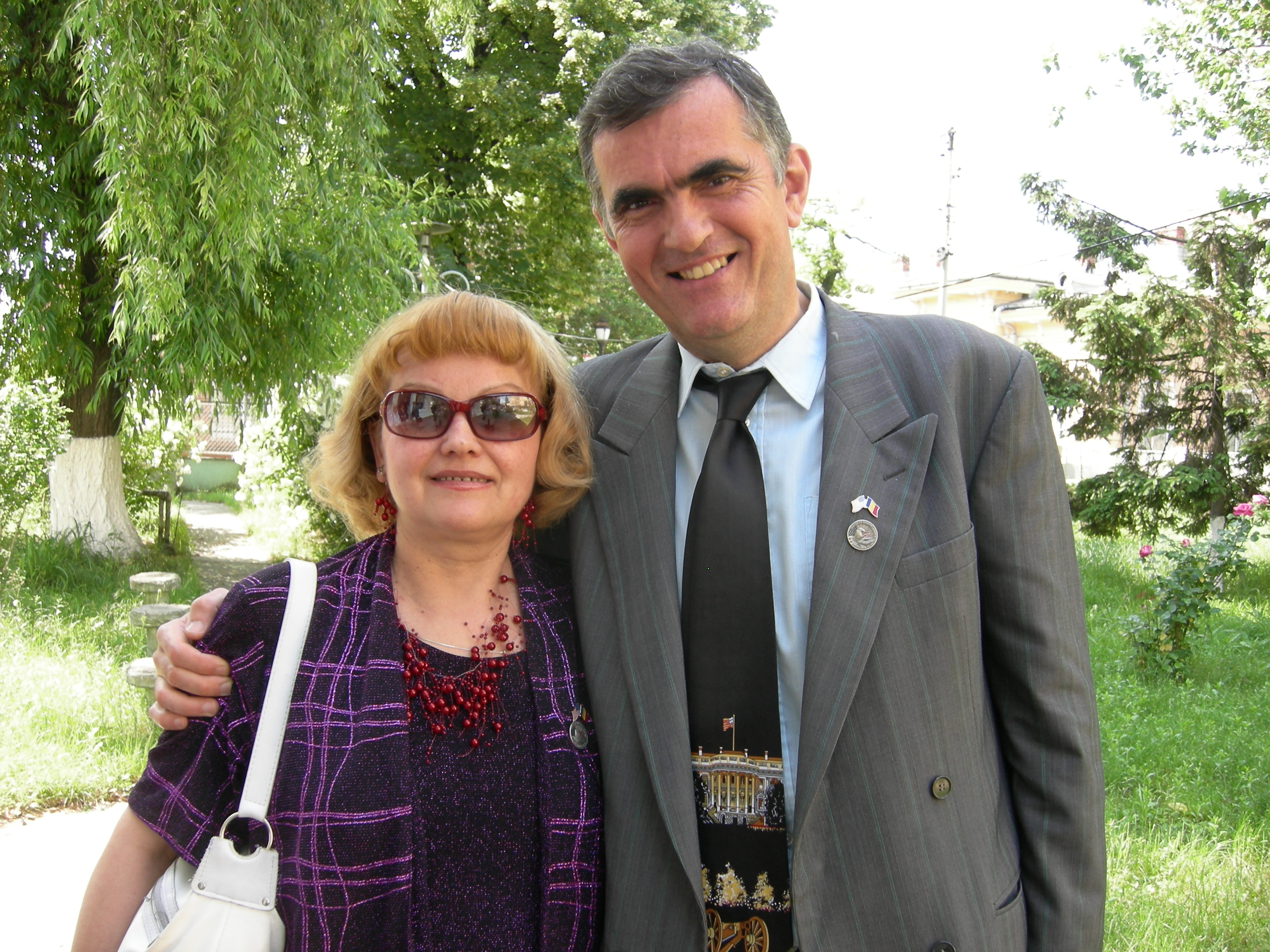
Nichifor and his wife Liana Alexandra. The couple performed together as Duo Intermedia.

Nichifor is a professor at the National University of Music. He married the late Romanian musician and composer Liana Alexandra in 1978. They performed together as cellist and pianist in the Duo Intermedia from 1990 and were co-directors of the Nuova Musica Consonante – Living Music Foundation Festival.

== Prizes and honors ==
Among Nichifor's prizes and honors are the 1977 Gaudeamus International Composers Award and the Belgian Order of the Crown (conferred in 2008).

== Principal works ==
Opera, symphonic, vocal-symphonic and visual music

- "Constellations" for Orchestra (1977)
- Symphony I "Shadows" (1980)
- Cantata "Sources" (1977)
- Cantata "Gloria Heroum Holocausti" (1978)
- Opera "Miss Christina" (libretto by Mircea ELIADE,1981)
- Symphony II "Via Lucis" (1985)
- Symphony III "American Symphony – I" (1986)
- Symphony IV "American Symphony – II" (1987)
- Symphony V "Pro Patria" (1987)
- Symphony VI "Time Archways" (1988)
- Cantata "Remember" (1988)
- "Missa da Requiem" (1990)
- Chamber-Opera "Talaria" (libretto by Etienne DE SADELEER, 1994)
- Cantata "Per Christum" (1997)
- "Concerto GRIEGoriano" for Piano and Orchestra (1997)
- Chamber-Opera "Le Martyre de Saint Claude Debussy" (libretto after Claude Debussy and E.A.Poe, 1999)
- Symphony VII "Cello Memoirs" (2001–2003)
- "Cries from Earth to Heaven" – to the Holocaust martyrs (2007)
- "Tribute to Joseph Smith, The American Prophet" – visual music (2005–2007)
- Shoah – music dedicated to the Holocaust martyrs (2010–2013)
- Pentagon – visual music (2010)
- God Bless America! – visual music (2010)
- Symphony VIII "Tom & Huck" (2011–2012)
- Symphony IX "God Bless Romania" (2016)
- Piano Concerto No.2 (2016)
- Homage to my Mother (dedicated to Dr. Livia Balint-Nichifor) (2017)

Chamber, choral, and vocal music

- "Postludium" per Organo (1975)
- "Sorcova" per Coro Misto a capella (1995)
- Quartetto per Archi I – "Anamorphose" (1976)
- "Carols" per Trombone e Percussione (1978)
- "Invocatio" per Flauto e Celesta (1979)
- "Canto di Speranza" per Flauto, Violino, Viola, Cello e Pianoforte (1981)
- "Onirophonie" per Fl., Vn.e Pf. (1982)
- "Chanson d'Antan" per Vn.e Pf.(1983)
- "Carnyx" per Clarinetto (1984)
- "Tango for Yvar" per Pf.(1984)
- Quartetto per Archi II – "Vallons de l'Oubli" (1984)
- "Aprite le porte di questo castel" per Coro Maschile (1984)
- "Morendo" per Cb. e Pianoforte (1985)
- "6 Melodies Irlandaises d'Amerique" per 2 Ob., C.i. e 2 Fg. (1985)
- "Czarna Rosa" per Mezzo-Soprano e Pf. (1986)
- "7 Canti Rumeni di Natale" per 4 Trombe, 4 Tromboni ed Organo (1986)
- "Horn Call Rag" per Corno e Pf. (1986)
- "Ave Maria" per Soprano ed Organo (1987)
- "Isola di Euthanasios" – Sonata "sopra acqua e pietra" per Pianoforte (1988)
- "Transgressio" per Fl., Ob. e Fg. (1989)
- "Battuta" per Percussione (1989)
- "Il nome della rosa" for violoncello and piano 4 hands (1989)
- "Lacrimosa" per Tenore e Pf. (1989)
- "Meditatio"per Organo (1990)
- Missa "Actio Gratiarum Oecumenica" per Coro Misto a capella (1991)
- "Natalis Domini" per Coro Misto a capella (1992)
- "Isihia" per Cello (1992)
- "Epiphania" per Cello e Pianoforte (1993)
- "Rorate Caeli" per Soprano ed Orchestra da Camera (1994)
- "Medium per Arpa" (1995)
- "Medium per Flauto" (1995)
- "3 Christmas German Chorals" for Organ (1997)
- "Hommage a Debussy" per 2 Pf. – ossia Pf. e Nastro Magnetico (1998)
- "La Nuit Obscure" per Orchestra da Camera (1998)
- "Invocation a Themis" per Sax. Alto (2001)
- "Isihia" for violoncello and tape (2002)
- Tu es Sacerdos (To my Mother Dr. Livia Nichifor) (2017)

== Discography ==
- Șerban Nichifor, Liana Alexandra, Anton Șuteu, Anamorphose, Incantații II, Culori, – Cvartetul Gaudeamus, Formația Musica Nova, LP, Electrecord ST-ECE 01694
- "Olympia Romanian Concert" – "Four Tablatures for Lute by Valentin Greff Bakfark" by Sigismund Toduță, "Concerto for Violin and Orchestra" by Paul Constantinescu, "American Symphony No.4 – From West to East" by Șerban Nichifor, Audio CD, Olympia, London, OCD 417
- Video Music Cyberart – Liana Alexandra, Șerban Nichifor – 12 Variations, Infinite Song, Sticky Dances, Video DVD, Electrecord EDVD 001, Licență Nr. RO8AV20500382
- Music from Romania and Belgium: Cesar Franck, Jacques Leduc, Raoul De Smet, Boudewijn Buckinx, Liana Alexandra, Șerban Nichifor – Duo Intermedia, Șerban Nichifor (cello) and Liana Alexandra (piano), Editura Muzicală, Poziție catalog 038, Licență U.C.M.R.-A.D.A. 5AF081508184
- Luxembourg Sinfonietta – World Premiere Recordings, “La Nuit Obscure”, Audio CD, Editions LGNM, No. 401, BP 828, L-2018 Luxembourg
- 60x60 (2004–2005) Vox Novus VN-001
- 60x60 (2006–2007) Vox Novus VN-002
