= Sophia Yan =

American pianist and journalist

- Chinese: 嚴倩君
- Born: October 8, 1986 (age 39); New York City, New York, U.S.
- Education: Oberlin College and Conservatory of Music
- Occupations: Classical pianist; journalist

Sophia Yan (嚴倩君, pinyin: Yán Qiànjūn, b. October 8, 1986) is an American classical pianist and a journalist at The Daily Telegraph.

== Early life and education ==
Yan was born to Taiwanese parents in Queens, New York. She majored in English and Piano Performance at Oberlin College and Conservatory of Music and graduated in 2009. She is fluent in Mandarin and speaks basic Taiwanese, Cantonese, Spanish, and some Japanese.

== Career ==
=== Early career in music ===
Yan won the International Concert Alliance Competition and a laureate of the International Young Artist Piano Competition in Washington, D.C. In addition, she is a two-time winner of the Music Teachers National Association Competition of Eastern New Jersey, and prize-winning alumnus of the 2004 New York Piano Competition. Her awards include four-time First Prize winner of the Steinway Society Competition, First Place in the Battleground Symphony Concerto Competition, Grand Prize in the Bookstaber Memorial Piano Competition, First Place in the NJMTA Scholarship Competition and Grand Prize in the Goldblatt Scholarship Competition.

As Neil Genzlinger of The New York Times describes, when Yan plays “the music literally pulls her off the piano bench; she ranges up and down the keyboard so quickly and with such ferocity that mere sitting will not do.”

Yan has performed widely in the United States, Europe and Asia, appearing at Lincoln Center, Carnegie Hall, Steinway Hall, CAMI Hall, Kennedy Center, St. Mark's, the Eastern Music Festival, Niagara International Chamber Music Festival, and the Shaw Festival in Niagara-on-the-Lake, Canada. Solo orchestral engagements include collaborations with the Battleground Symphony, Rowan Chamber and East Brunswick Chamber Orchestras. She has also performed on the Composer's Voice Concert Series in New York City as well as participating in the Vox Novus series Fifteen-Minutes-of-Fame project. She also provides the music for the Lawfare podcast.

=== Journalism ===
In July 2010, Yan started her journalism career as a reporter for Bloomberg News based in Hong Kong and Washington, D.C. In 2013, Yan joined CNN. In 2014, as an Asia Business Reporter for CNNMoney, Yan covered the 2014 pro-democracy protests in Hong Kong.

Yan was a Beijing correspondent at CNBC. She covers topics from technology to economics in China and Asia. As of 2019, she has been working for The Daily Telegraph.

== See also ==
- Chinese Americans in New York City
- Conservative Asian Americans
- New Yorkers in journalism
- Oberlin Conservatory of Music
- Taiwanese Americans in New York City
