= Mark Gresham =

American composer and journalist

Mark Gresham (born 6 March 1956, Atlanta, Georgia, United States) is an American composer and music journalist. In 2003, he was the recipient of ASCAP's Deems Taylor Award for 'Sounds Like Home,' an article about American composer Jennifer Higdon, published in Creative Loafing (Atlanta) on 13 November 2002. In addition to being a contributing writer for Creative Loafing (Atlanta) from 2002 to 2012, Gresham has also written for NewMusicBox (the online journal of the American Music Center) and other publications. He was a music journalist/critic for ArtsATL. Gresham initially wrote articles for the online-only publication starting in mid-2011 (at the time known as ArtsCriticATL) and then more extensively as of November 2011 upon the departure of Pierre Ruhe, its principal music critic, executive director, and co-founder. Gresham quit writing for ArtsATL in February 2019 over editorial issues that had begun to emerge near the end of 2018. At that point, what had been a very occasional personal music blog, EarRelevant, became, for Gresham, a full-time music journal for which he is both publisher and principal writer
