= Eva Ingolf =

Icelandic violinist

Eva Mjöll Ingólfsdóttir
- Born: 22 June 1962 (age 63); Reykjavík, Iceland
- Spouse: Kristinn Sv. Helgason
- Children: 1
- Musical career
- Genres: Classical
- Occupation: Soloist
- Instrument: Violin

Eva Mjöll Ingólfsdóttir (born 22 June 1962) is an Icelandic violinist.

== Education ==
Eva began violin studies at the age of six at Barnamúsíkskólinn. After studying at the Conservatory of Reykjavík for 6 years, Eva left Iceland at the age of 18 to study around Europe, including at the Royal Conservatory of Brussels, the Conservatoire de Musique de Genève and the Sweelinck Conservatory in Amsterdam.

== Career ==
Throughout her career, Eva has given numerous solo recitals in Iceland, Japan, the United States, Russia and Europe, including regularly at the Weill Recital Hall at Carnegie Hall, the Trinity Church in New York City and the Corcoran Gallery of Art in Washington, D.C. She has released two CDs on the Japis label. Eva has also recorded for the Icelandic state radio, RÚV.

In 1995-1996, she undertook studies in composition, conducting and orchestration at Harvard University.

Eva has received grants from NYWC IN 2014, as well as the American Scandinavian Society in 2015.

== Instrument ==
Eva plays on a violin made by Matteo Goffriller in 1720, formerly the concert instrument of the Russian violinist Dmitri Tsyganov, leader of the Beethoven Quartet.

== Personal life ==
Eva is the daughter of Icelandic musician Ingólfur Guðbrandsson. She is married to Kristinn Sv. Helgason, an official of the United Nations Secretariat. Together they have one daughter, musician and actress Andrea Kristinsdóttir.
