= Emma Lou Diemer =

American composer (1927–2024)

Background information
- Born: November 24, 1927; Kansas City, Missouri, U.S.
- Died: June 2, 2024 (aged 96) Santa Barbara, California, U.S.
- Genres: Contemporary classical music
- Occupation: Composer
- Website: www.emmaloudiemermusic.com/page/page/6385943.htm

Emma Lou Diemer (November 24, 1927 – June 2, 2024) was an American composer.

== Biography ==
Diemer was born in Kansas City, Missouri, on November 24, 1927. She wrote many works for orchestra, chamber ensemble, keyboard, voice, chorus, and electronic media. Diemer was a keyboard performer and gave concerts of her own organ works at Washington National Cathedral, The Cathedral of Our Lady of the Angels in Los Angeles, Grace Cathedral and St. Mary's Cathedral in San Francisco, and others.

Works include many collections and single pieces for organ as well as many for solo piano, piano 4 hands, and two pianos. Her major chamber works include a piano quartet, string quartet, two piano trios, and sonatas and suites for flute, violin, cello, and piano as well as settings of the psalms for organ with other instruments. Diemer wrote many choral works as well. She wrote numerous hymns, several of which appear in church hymnals. Her songs number in the dozens, using texts by many contemporary and early poets including Walt Whitman, Amy Lowell, Sara Teasdale, Alice Meynell, Thomas Campion, Shakespeare, John Donne, her sister Dorothy Diemer Hendry, Emily Dickinson, Robert Lowell, and many others.

Diemer's compositional style over the years varied from tonal to atonal, from traditional to experimental. She wrote works for non-professional and professional performers, originally under the "Gebrauchsmusik" philosophy, but produced many works, particularly for keyboard, that are difficult and challenging. The latter category includes her "Fantasy" for piano; her piano sonatas; Seven Etudes for piano; Homage to Cowell, Cage, Crumb, and Czerny for two pianos; Variations for Piano Four Hands (Homage to Ravel, Schoenberg, and May Aufderheide); Four Biblical Settings for organ, Concerto for Organ ("Alaska"); and many psalm setting collections. The totally serial "Declarations" for organ (1973) contrasts to the more tonal 2013 concerto for violin and orchestra "Summer Day". Her work in the electronic field during her years on the faculty of the University of California influenced a number of pieces, including her Toccata for piano.

Diemer died in Santa Barbara, California, on June 2, 2024, at the age of 96.

== Academics ==
While in high school, Diemer took composition lessons with Gardner Read and studied piano with Wiktor Labunski, director of the Kansas City Conservatory. Her teachers included Paul Hindemith, Bernard Rogers, Howard Hanson, Ernst Toch and Roger Sessions. She received both her B.M. and her M.M from the Yale School of Music in 1949 and 1950, respectively. She then went on to study composition in Brussels, Belgium on a Fulbright Scholarship from 1952 to 1953, ultimately returning to the United States to receive her Ph.D from the Eastman School of Music in 1960. She was professor of theory and composition at the University of Maryland from 1965 to 1970, and joined the faculty of the University of California, Santa Barbara in 1971. She was professor emerita, from 1991 to 2024.

While at UCSB, Diemer helped to establish the computer/electronic music program.

== Notable works ==
She was composer-in-residence with the Santa Barbara Symphony 1990-92. The symphony premiered 4 of her works:

- Concerto in One Movement for Piano (which received a Kennedy Center Friedheim award in 1992), recorded in Volume X of the MMC New Century series of CDs (MMC 2067, released in 1998), performed by Betty Oberacker, soloist, and the Prague Radio Symphony Orchestra led by Vladimír Válek. One of its features is that it sporadically employs dampened piano strings.
- Santa Barbara Overture
- Homage to Tchaikovsky
- Chumash Indian Dance Celebration

Other notable works:

- Songs for the Earth, commissioned by the San Francisco Choral Society, performed in Davies Hall, 2005. The work is for chorus and orchestra, with texts by Emily Dickinson, Mary Oliver, Dorothy Diemer Hendry, Omar Khayyam, and Hildegard von Bingen
- Fragments from the Mass for chorus, 2 pianos, percussion.
- Concerto in One Movement for Marimba (1991), commissioned by the Women's Philharmonic of San Francisco.
- Fantasy for Carillon (2009), commissioned by Margo Halsted. It premiered in September 2009, at the 40th anniversary of the Storke Carillon at the University of California, Santa Barbara.

Two important collaborations, among many, with fellow musicians were with Joan Devee Dixon, organist, who commissioned over 50 works for organ and various instruments and instrumental ensembles from Diemer during the 1990s and early 2000, and Philip Ficsor, violinist, who commissioned several violin and piano compositions from Diemer and recorded her complete works for violin and piano and including the concerto for violin (2013).

== Awards ==
- Edward Benjamin Award, Eastman School of Music
- Certificate of Merit, Yale School of Music
- Fulbright Scholarship (1952-1953)
- Missouri Federation of Music Clubs Award (1955)
- National Endowment for the Arts Fellowship
- Composer-in-Residence in the Arlington, Virginia schools, Ford Foundation Young Composers Grant (1959-1961)
- ASCAP (annually since 1962)
- Friedheim Award, Kennedy Center (1992)
- Composer of the Year, American Guild of Organists (1995)
- Certificate of Merit, Mu Phi Epsilon
- Honorary Doctor of Letters, University of Central Missouri (1999)

== Family ==
Diemer's parents were George Willis Diemer (1885–1956), American educator, college president, one of a group of American educators who were sent by the U.S. Dept. of State to reorganize the educational system of Japan after World War II; and Myrtle Diemer née Casebolt (1889–1961), church worker and homemaker. Diemer's siblings were poet/teacher Dorothy Diemer Hendry (1918–2006); George Willis Diemer II (1920–1944), Marine fighter pilot, musician/teacher; John Irving Diemer (1920–1964), school principal/musician in Overland Park, Kansas.
