= Stratford Circus =

Arts Venue in London

Coordinates: 51.5427°N 0.0015°E

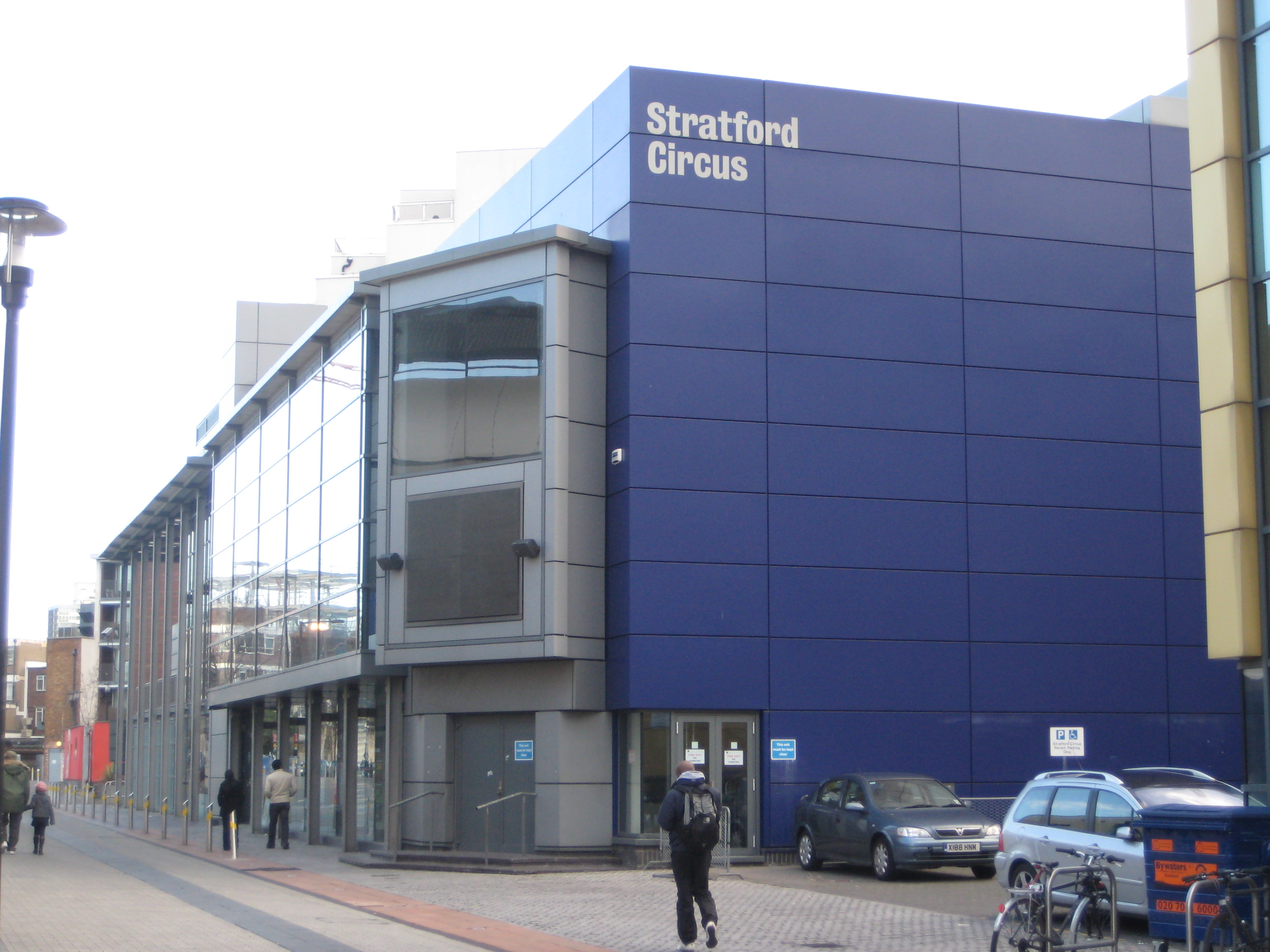
- Interactive map of Stratford Circus
- Address: Stratford Centre; Newham, London
- Owner: Stratford Arts Trust
- Capacity: Circus 1: 300-seat (650 standing); Circus 2: 93-seat (160 standing); Circus 3: Dance studio
- Type: Arts Centre
- Production: Family and Adult Programming

Construction
- Opened: 2001
- Years active: 2020
- Architect: Levitt Bernstein

Website
- www.stratford-circus.com

Stratford Circus was a contemporary performing arts venue in Stratford in the London Borough of Newham, east London. It was designed by Levitt Bernstein architects and built with funding from the National Lottery, and had been operated by the Stratford Arts Trust charity since 2011.

Stratford Circus had conference and meeting facilities, hosting six "flexible spaces", three of which are theatre spaces that have been used by organisations for training, conferences and away days. Stratford Circus leads the National Partnership of Arts Centres (NPAC) through their Director and NPAC co-chair Clare Connor.

Organisations who have been based at the venue include East London Dance, Urban Development, Theatre Venture, and the Newham Youth and Community Education Service. The University of East London's Institute of Performing Arts Development (iPAD) and the London International Festival of Theatre (LIFT) are also working in partnership with the centre.

== History ==
Stratford Circus was situated on a site which was occupied by a chemical works until the 1970s. In 1995, London Borough of Newham and Theatre Royal Stratford East successfully bid to the National Lottery for funds to construct Stratford Circus and to refurbish the Theatre Royal. In 1998, Jon Harris was appointed to lead the building project and establish the operating company. The name "Stratford Circus" was chosen as the result of a research and branding exercise undertaken by the new company.

The building was opened in 2001 by Tony Banks. Jon Harris left the organisation in 1992 to become Producer of Shared Experience. The new Director was Peter Conway. The organisation's board went into voluntary liquidation in August 2003, following a loss of funding. The London Borough of Newham stepped in and assumed interim management responsibility. In 2005, Newham Sixth Form College (NewVIc), who had been a partner from the outset, took over the management and a ten-year lease for the venue, under the leadership of Clare Connor. In 2011, Stratford Arts Trust was formed and took over management of the venue. From 2011 to 2021 Stratford Circus hosted over 1 million audience members in person and online, 2,000 artists & practitioners, worked with 350,000 participants and supported the development of new work by over 350 emerging and established artists. The decision to wind up was taken in 2021 by the charity's trustees following the termination of its tenancy of Stratford Circus Arts Centre by the London Borough of Newham and the subsequent withdrawal of funding by Arts Council England.

The centre hosted the first ever BBC Question Time pre-election debate in 2005 featuring all three leaders of the mainstream political parties: then Prime Minister Tony Blair, then Tory Leader Michael Howard and then Liberal Democrat Leader Charles Kennedy.

Artists who have performed their work at Stratford Circus include Andy Hamilton, Billy Bragg, John Hegley, Seun Kuti and 60x60. 60x60 Dance held its European debut at Stratford Circus in 2010. The event featured more than 150 dancers with 60 choreographers creating dances to each of the 60 one-minute works in the 60x60 project.

Stratford Circus was the training facility for the Japanese athletes during the 2012 Olympics in London.

== Sources ==
Blake, A. (2005) 'Collaboration or collapse? NewVIc and the Stratford Cultural Quarter', in Jeffery, G. (ed) (2005) The Creative College: building a successful learning culture in the arts, Stoke-on-Trent, Trentham Books.
