= Grimason =

Grimason is a surname. Notable people with the surname include:

- Alistair Grimason (1957–2022), Irish Anglican priest
- Stephen Grimason (1957–2024), Northern Irish journalist

== See also ==
- Grimson
- Grímsson
