= Electronic Music Midwest =

- Genre: electroacoustic music
- Location: Kansas
- Years active: 2000-present
- Founders: Kansas City Kansas Community College (KCKCC), Lewis University, and the University of Missouri–Kansas City, Paul Rudy
- Website: Official website

Electronic Music Midwest (EMM) is a festival of new electroacoustic music.

== History ==
EMM is the result of a consortium formed between Kansas City Kansas Community College (KCKCC), Lewis University, and the University of Missouri–Kansas City. This festival was founded by Mike McFerron, Connie Mayfield, and Paul Rudy in 2000 when it was presented at KCKCC under the name "Kansas City Electronic Music Festival." In 2001, the festival continued at Lewis University under the title, "Electronic Music at Lewis - 2001." Electronic Music Midwest became the official name at the 2002 festival held at Kansas City Kansas Community College.

In celebration of EMM's 10th anniversary, Lewis University hosted the first EMM mini-Invitational festival on March 11, 2010. 15 composers were invited to present up to 15 minutes of music during this one-day, three concert festival. Among other compositions, highlights from this festival included Three Improvisatory Groovescapes (performed by the composer) by EMM technical director, Ian Corbett, Tranquility by Kyong Mee Choi, Bapu (performed by Lisa Bost-Sandberg) by Asha Srinivasan, and Texturologie 6: Emerald Emergent by James Caldwell.

Electronic Music Midwest (EMM) alternates each year between Kansas City, Kansas and the suburbs of Chicago in Romeoville, Illinois. Besides the main festival which is usually takes place over three days. The festival also presents "mini" festivals which are one day events presented as outreach to other cities. Composer's Voice Concert Series hosted an EMM mini-Invitational festival In New York City on June 24, 2012. Western Michigan University as part of is New Sounds Festival hosted EMM mini-Invitational festival in Kalamazoo, Michigan.

EMM has always featured an 8-speaker surround diffusion system under the guidance of Ian Corbett. The core of the system are eight Mackie 1521 bi-amped speakers, an EAW/QSC subwoofer system, and a Soundcraft MH3, 32+4 Channel mixer.

Since its beginning, EMM has programmed over 500 new electroacoustic compositions. Composers have traveled from around the world to graciously share their music with audiences in the Midwest. EMM strives to create an environment conducive to building community interaction. "Electronic Music Midwest has been dedicated to program a variety of electro-acoustic music, and to provide the highest quality of e-media presentations."

Most concerts are approximately one hour long, and composers have plenty of time to "talk shop" with each other as well as interact socially with students and audience members.

== Special guest composers and performers ==
- Tom Lopez – 2000 (Kansas City Electronic Music Festival - KCKCC)
- James Mobberley – 2001 ("Electronic Music at Lewis - 2001")
- Mark Applebaum – Spring 2002 (KCKCC)
- Elizabeth McNutt – Fall 2002 (Lewis University)
- Mark Wingate – Fall 2003 (UMKC)
- Kevin Austin – Fall 2004 (Lewis University)
- Robert Voisey and 60x60 – Fall 2005 (KCKCC)
- CECh Celebrating 50 Years of Electroacoustic Music from Chile – Fall 2006 (Lewis University)
- Chicago Composers Forum – Fall 2008
- 60x60 Dance – Fall 2009 (KCKCC)
- Kansas City Electronic Music and Arts Alliance (KcEMA) – Fall 2009 (KCKCC)
- Rebecca Ashe – Fall 2010 (Lewis University)
- Elizabeth Bunt – Fall 2011 (KCKCC)
- Andrew Spencer – Fall 2012 (Lewis University)
- Kari Johnson – Fall 2013 (KCKCC)
- Craig Hultgren – Fall 2014 (Lewis University)
- Keith Benjamin – Fall 2015 (KCKCC)
- Sarah Plum – Fall 2016 (Lewis University)
- Splice Ensemble – Fall 2017 (KCKCC)
- Margaret Lancaster – Fall 2018 (Lewis University)
- Drew Whiting – Fall 2019 (KCKCC)
- ScottDeal – Spring 2020
- Andrea Cheeseman – Spring 2022
- Scott Deal - Spring 2023
- Michael Hall - Spring 2024
- Lisa Bost-Sandberg – Spring 2025
- Mary Hubbell - Spring 2026

== Staff ==
- Mike McFerron – founder and festival director
- Ian Corbett – festival director/technical director
- Jay Batzner – programming director
- Jason Bolte – technical director
- David McIntire – marketing director
- Robert Voisey – organization advancement director

== Articles & reviews ==
- Kari Väkevän teos kantaesitetään Kansasissa Lansivayla on 11/17/2015 - 17:00 CULTURE
- Electronic Music Midwest to make sounds, beautiful to 'granulated and anxious' at the Dalton Center Mark Wedel, Special to the Kalamazoo Gazette on March 12, 2013
- 2007 EMM Festival in Kansas City by Asymmetry Magazine. Quote: "...smooth-running, well-organized, sonically and musically superior event, put on by some truly lovely people."

== See also ==
- List of electronic music festivals
