= George Nixon =

George Nixon may refer to:

- George E. Nixon (1898–1981), Canadian Member of Parliament for Algoma West, 1940–1968
- George S. Nixon (1860–1912), American Senator from Nevada, 1905–1912
- George Adam Nixon (1923–1998), Canadian politician
- George Nixon (cricketer) (1850–1913), English cricketer
- George Nixon (priest), Archdeacon of Tuam, 1939–1950
- George Nixon (racing driver) (1913–1990), English racing driver
