= Edward Burton (priest) =

Irish Anglican priest

Edward Edmund Burton (1737-1817) was an Anglican priest in Ireland during the late 18th and early 19th centuries.

Burton was born in County Galway and educated at Trinity College Dublin. He was appointed Prebendary of Kilmeen then Faldown at Tuam Cathedral in 1768. in 1771 he became Archdeacon of Tuam and Vicar general of the diocese. from 1795 until 1796; and Dean of Killala from then until his death in 1817.
