= Richard Bourne =

Richard Bourne may refer to:

- Richard Bourne (footballer) (born 1954), English footballer
- Richard Bourne (priest) (died 1817), Anglican priest in Ireland
