= Gervase of Canterbury =

12th and 13th-century monk and chronicler

Gervase of Canterbury (/dʒərˈveɪz/; Latin: Gervasus Cantuariensis or Gervasius Dorobornensis) (c. 1141 – c. 1210) was an English chronicler.

== Life ==
If Gervase's brother Thomas, who like himself was a monk of Christ Church, Canterbury, was Thomas of Maidstone, they came of a Kentish family. St. Thomas of Canterbury received his religious profession on 16 February 1163, and perhaps then ordained him. He was certainly one of the monks who buried the saint after his martyrdom, on 29 December 1170.

Historical records show that Gervase took a prominent part in the disputes between the monks and Archbishop Baldwin (1185-1191) and was one of the monks sent to announce to the archbishop an appeal to the pope. In 1189 he was again one of a deputation sent to lay the matter before King Richard I. As yet, Gervase, though one of the senior monks, had held no prominent office, but about this time he was made sacristan, for in 1193 he attended the new archbishop, Hubert Walter, in that capacity. He probably ceased to hold this office in 1197 when he speaks of one "Felix", as sacristan.

The rest of Gervase's life is obscure. He was still writing in 1199 and there are slight indications in another chronicle, the Gesta Regum, that he continued to write till 1210, when a sudden change in style and arrangement point to a new chronicler. His death may therefore be assumed in or soon after that year. Gervase has occasionally been confused with others of the same name, notably with Gervase of S. Ceneri, and thus he is described as prior of Dover by Michel Jean Joseph Brial, which is impossible on chronological grounds. Thomas Duffus Hardy identified him with Gervase of Chichester, but William Stubbs argued against this theory, as also against confusing him with Gervase of Melkley.

== Gervase and the Moon ==
Five witnesses from Canterbury reported to the abbey's chronicler, Gervase, that shortly after sunset on 18 June 1178, they saw "the upper horn [of the moon] split in two." Furthermore, Gervase writes, "From the midpoint of the division a flaming torch sprang up, spewing out, over a considerable distance, fire, hot coals and sparks. Meanwhile the body of the Moon which was below writhed, as it were in anxiety, and to put it in the words of those who reported it to me and saw it with their own eyes, the Moon throbbed like a wounded snake. Afterwards it resumed its proper state. This phenomenon was repeated a dozen times or more, the flame assuming various twisting shapes at random and then returning to normal. Then, after these transformations, the Moon from horn to horn, that is along its whole length, took on a blackish appearance". In 1976 the geologist Jack B. Hartung proposed that this described the formation of the crater Giordano Bruno.

Modern theories predict that a (conjectural) asteroid or comet impact on the Moon would cause a plume of molten matter rising up from the surface, which is consistent with the witnesses' description. In addition, the location recorded fits in well with the crater's location. Additional evidence of Giordano Bruno's youth is its spectacular ray system: because micrometeorites constantly rain down, they kick up enough dust to quickly (in geological terms) erode a ray system. So it can be reasonably hypothesized that Giordano Bruno was formed during the span of human history, perhaps in June 1178.

Other researches have calculated that such a meteoric impact would have had more prolonged affects noticeable from earth, such as intense meteor showers, whereas there are no other observation mentioning any lunar phenomena from anywhere in the world on that date.

== Literature ==
The works of Gervase consist of: (1) The Chronicle, covering the period from 1100 to 1199. It was first printed by Twysden in Historiae Anglicanae Scriptores Decem (London, 1652). (2) The Gesta Regum, which is in part an abridgment of the earlier chronicle, and from the year 1199 an independent source of great value for the early years of John's reign. (3) Actus Pontificum Cantuariensis Ecclesia, a history of the archbishops of Canterbury to the death of Hubert Walter in 1205, also printed by Twysden with the chronicle. (4) Mappa Mundi, a topographical work with lists of bishoprics and ecclesiastical foundations in the various counties of England, Wales, and part of Scotland. The works of Gervase were published in the Rolls Series in 1879–1880 under the editorship of Dr. Stubbs, whose introduction has been the groundwork of all subsequent accounts of Gervase.

== Modern representations ==
A play by Dorothy L. Sayers, The Zeal of Thy House is based on Gervase's account of the injury and resignation of William of Sens.
