= Chichester (disambiguation) =

Chichester is a city in West Sussex, England.

Chichester may also refer to:

== Places ==
=== United Kingdom ===
- Chichester (district), a local government district in West Sussex
- Chichester, Tyne and Wear, an area of South Shields in North East England
- Chichester Park, an electoral ward of North Belfast, Northern Ireland
- Diocese of Chichester, a Church of England diocese
- Chichester (UK Parliament constituency)

=== Canada ===
- Chichester, Quebec, a municipality in the Outaouais region

=== United States ===
- Chichester, New Hampshire, a town
- Chichester, New York, a hamlet in the Catskill Mountains
- Chichester, Pennsylvania, formerly the port town of New Chichester and now divided into 4 municipalities including the separate townships of
  - Upper Chichester Township, Pennsylvania
  - Lower Chichester Township, Pennsylvania

=== Australia ===
- Chichester River

== People ==
=== Given name ===
- Chichester Bell (1848–1924), chemist, cousin to Alexander Graham Bell, and instrumental in developing improved versions of the phonograph
- Chichester Parkinson-Fortescue

=== Surname ===
- Arthur Chichester, 1st Baron Chichester (1563–1625), Lord Deputy of Ireland from 1604 to 1615
- Arthur Chichester, 1st Baron Templemore (1797–1837), Anglo-Irish soldier, politician, and courtier
- Lord Arthur Chichester (1808–1840), MP for Belfast
- Aston Chichester (1879–1962), first Roman Catholic Archbishop of Salisbury (now Harare, Zimbabwe)
- Christopher Chichester, an alleged alias of Christian Karl Gerhartsreiter (see Clark Rockefeller)
- D. G. Chichester (born 1964), American comic book writer
- Edward Chichester, 1st Viscount Chichester (1568–1648), Anglo-Irish nobleman
- Sir Francis Chichester (1901–1972), British round the world yachtsman
- Sir Gerald Chichester (1886–1939), British diplomat and courtier who served as Private Secretary to Queen Mary.
- Giles Chichester (1946–2026), British Conservative Party politician, and was a Member of the European Parliament (MEP) for South West England and Gibraltar
- Guy Chichester (1935–2009), founding member of the Clamshell Alliance, an anti-nuclear group that led protests against Seabrook Station Nuclear Power Plant in the 1970s, which led to a broader environmental movement
- Happy Chichester, American singer-songwriter and multi-instrumentalist, living in Columbus, Ohio
- Henry Manners Chichester (1832–1894), British Army officer who after ten years active service overseas returned home and became an author
- James Chichester-Clark, Baron Moyola (1923–2002), former Prime Minister of Northern Ireland
- Lord John Chichester (1811–1873), MP for Belfast
- Sir John Chichester (died 1569) (1520–1569), MP and High Sheriff of Devon
- Robert Chichester (disambiguation)
- Sir Robin Chichester-Clark (1928–2016), MP for Londonderry
- Rosanna Chichester (born 1991), beauty pageant titleholder who was crowned Miss British Virgin Islands 2013 and represented British Virgin Islands at Miss World 2014

=== By location ===
- Gervase of Chichester (died 1190s), English clergyman and writer active in the late 12th century
- Godfrey of Chichester (died 1088), medieval Bishop of Chichester
- Hilary of Chichester (died 1169), medieval Bishop of Chichester in England
- Richard of Chichester (1197–1253), who was Bishop of Chichester
- Robert of Chichester (died 1160), medieval Bishop of Exeter

== Other ==
- Marquess of Donegall, a title held by the Chichester family
- Siege of Chichester, a victory by Parliamentarian forces led by Colonel William Waller over a small Royalist garrison
- Chichester College, a college of further education in Chichester, West Sussex
- Chichester Free School, a mixed free school located in Chichester, West Sussex, England
- Chichester House, a building in College Green (formerly Hoggen Green), Dublin, Ireland, used in the 17th century to house the Parliament of Ireland
- Chichester Psalms, a choral work by Leonard Bernstein for boy treble or countertenor, solo quartet, choir and orchestra (3 trumpets in B♭, 3 trombones, timpani, percussion [5 players], 2 harps, and strings)
- Chichester School District, a midsized, suburban public school district located in southeastern Delaware County, Pennsylvania
- Dean of Chichester, the dean of Chichester Cathedral in Sussex, England
- Peter of Chichester, the Dean of Wells during 1220
- Rape of Chichester, one of the rapes (traditional sub-divisions) of the historic county of Sussex in England
- Chichester Festival Theatre, a theatre in Chichester, England
- Chichesters, a former New York City gang

== See also ==
- Arthur Chichester (disambiguation)
- James Chichester (disambiguation)
- Edward Chichester (disambiguation)
