= Gimson =

Gimson is a surname which may refer to:

- John Gimson (1983), Olympic silver Medalist
- Alfred C. Gimson (1917–1985), English phonetician
- Andrew Gimson (born 1958), British political journalist and writer
- Christopher Gimson (1886–1975), English cricketer and colonial administrator
- Ernest Gimson (1864–1919), English furniture designer and architect
- Sir Franklin Gimson (1890–1975), British colonial administrator in Ceylon, Hong Kong and Singapore
- Sally Gimson, British Labour Party politician
- Samson Gimson (born 1964), Singaporean professional golfer

== See also ==
- Gimson (cycles), Catalan bicycle and motorcycle brand
- Gimson and Company, British steam engine manufacturer
- Grimson, surname
