= Mike McFerron =

American composer (born 1970)

Mike McFerron (born 1970) is an American composer.

== Biography ==
McFerron is currently serving as professor of music and composer-in-residence at Lewis University. He is the recipient of several awards and residencies including: first prize in the Louisville Orchestra Composition Competition (2002), first prize in the CANTUS commissioning/residency program (2002), recipient of the 2005 CCF Abelson Vocal Music Commission, and the Chicago Symphony Orchestra's First Hearing Program (2001) Mike McFerron is founder and co-director of Electronic Music Midwest festival.

His work Canticles was described as a "really rich, dark piece" McFerron's work was also part of several 60x60 mixes including the Sanguine Mix, Order of Magnitude Mix, 2010 International Mix, 2008 International Mix, Evolution Mix (part II) 2008 Midwest Mix, 2007 Midwest Mix, Munich Mix, 2005 International Mix and 2005 Midwest Mix.

"Mike McFerron’s Shape Study: Music for Metamorphoses was part composition, part sound design and full parts amazing."

McFerron has been commissioned by several organizations including Cantus and the Metropolitan Youth Symphony Orchestra.

== Compositions ==
=== Acoustic music ===
Orchestral

- Stepping Through. . . (1999)
- Perspectives (2000)
- Between the Extremes (2001)
- On the Edge for youth orchestra (2002)
- Hymnus Cherubicus for string orchestra (2004)
- Heroic Overture #1: Cuchulainn for youth orchestra (2005)
- FANFARE: Hope in the Face of Uncertainty (2009)

Concertante

- Ten High for piano and orchestra (1996)

Chamber music

- Red Earth for flute, clarinet, violin, cello, piano, and percussion (1996)
- Music for Viola and Piano (1996–1997)
- Experience 1 for solo percussion (1997)
- Music for Flute, Violin and Piano (1998)
- Conversation for flute (1999)
- Hamburger Pattie Machine for clarinet, violin, cello (1999)
- Three Short Pieces for Six Players for flute, clarinet, violin, cello, piano, and percussion (1999)
- Trio Divergent for flute, cello, and percussion (1999)
- Experience 3 for flute, oboe, clarinet, and cello (2000)
- Two Images for Violin (2001)
- Conversation 2 for vibraphone (2003)
- Insistent Disturbance for piano and percussion (2003)
- Improvisation for cello and percussionists (2004)
- Kreutzer Fantasy for violin, cello, and piano (2004)
- Lewis Fanfare for brass and percussion (2004)
- Winter Solstice for cello and piano (2004)

Piano

- Three Preludes (1999)
- Rainbow Magnetic Spinning Wheel for piano 4-hands (2003)

Vocal

- Dawn for soprano, tenor, and percussion (2001)
- Alleluia: De Quacumque Tribulatione for SATB (2002)
- Odiporìa for SATB and orchestra (2002)
- Bonitas Domini for SATB (2002, revised 2005)
- Journey to Sekhet Aanru for TTBB (2003)
- Hymnus Cherubicus for SATB (2004)
- The Sobbing of the Bells for SATB and piano (2004)
- Nunc Dimittis for SSA (2006)
- Two Songs on E. E. Cummings for mezzo-soprano and piano (2006)

=== Electroacoustic music ===
- Open Circuit - Flute and Computer (2010)
- Canotila: stretching toward the sky - Claves and Computer (2009)
- Shape Study: Music for Metamorphoses - Fixed Media (2008)
- Prelude to You Brought This on Yourself - Fixed Media (2008)
- Trai(p)(f)(m) - Fixed Media (2008)
- Dinadanvtli - Fixed Media (2006)
- Canticle - Voice and 5.1 Surround Sound Playback (2006)
- Torrid Mix - Piano and Fixed Media (2006)
- Minute Distances - Fixed Media (2005)
- ΔpΔx ≥ h/4π - Fixed Media (2004)
- 9.17.2003 - Fixed Media (2004)
- Dos Paisajes - Violin and Fixed Media (2002)
- Retrospection - Fixed Media (2001)
- Stationary Fronts - Flute and Fixed Media (1999)
- Music to Accompany "Plaid is 2% Truth - #2" - Fixed Media (1999)
- STRATUM - Piano and Fixed Media (1997)
- Chasm - Fixed Media (1995)

== Articles and reviews ==
- Eclectic electronics By Lee Hartman KCMetropolis.org Tue, Oct 04, 2011

== Discography ==
- Torid Mix
- Dinadanvtli - 60x60 (2006–2007) Vox Novus
- Minute Distance - 60x60 (2004–2005) Vox Novus
