= James Treanor (disambiguation) =

James Treanor may refer to:

- James Treanor, Archdeacon of Tuam
- Jim Treanor (1913-1966), English footballer, see List of Bury F.C. players (1–24 appearances)
