= Edward Chichester =

Edward Chichester may refer to:

- Edward Chichester, 1st Viscount Chichester (1568–1648)
- Edward Chichester, 4th Marquess of Donegall (1799–1889), Irish peer
- Edward Chichester, 6th Marquess of Donegall (1903–1975), British peer and journalist
- Sir Edward John Chichester, 11th Baronet
- Sir Edward Chichester, 9th Baronet (1849–1906) of the Chichester baronets
- Sir Edward George Chichester, 10th Baronet (1888–1940) of the Chichester baronets
- Sir (Edward), John Chichester, 11th Baronet (1916–2007) of the Chichester baronets
- Edward Chichester (priest), Irish Anglican priest

== See also ==
- Chichester baronets
- Chichester (disambiguation)
