= Chichester-Clark =

Chichester-Clark is a surname. Notable people include:

- Emma Chichester Clark (born 1955), British children's book illustrator and author
- James Chichester-Clark (1923–2002), penultimate Prime Minister of Northern Ireland
- James Lenox-Conyngham Chichester-Clark (1884–1933), member of parliament
- Robin Chichester-Clark (1928–2016), member of parliament for Londonderry

== See also ==
- Chichester (disambiguation)
- Clark (surname)
