= John Crampton (priest) =

Irish Anglican priest

John Crampton (1701–1771) was an Anglican priest during the 18th century.

Crampton was born in Armagh and educated at Trinity College, Dublin. He was Prebendary of Kilmoylan in Tuam Cathedral from 1733 to 1746; and Archdeacon of Tuam from then until his death in 1771.

He married Charlotte Twisleton, daughter of Fiennes Twisleton.

Coat of arms of John Crampton
Notes Posthumously granted by Sir Chichester Fortescue, Ulster King of Arms, on 14 April 1808. Crest A demi-lion rampant Or holding in his paws a helmet Proper. Escutcheon Sable a helmet Proper between two lions passant guardant Or in chief a rose Argent seeded of the second barbed Vert (Crampton) for augmentation a canton quarterly Or and Gules in the first quarter a lion passant Azure (Say and Sele). Motto Fortem Posce Animum
