= Keatinge =

Keatinge is a surname. Notable people with the surname include:

- Cadogan Keatinge (1720–1799), Anglican priest in Ireland
- Edgar Keatinge (1905–1998), English farmer, soldier and Conservative Party politician
- Joe Keatinge (born 1982), American comic book writer and editor
- John Keatinge (1769–1817), Irish Anglican priest
- Maurice Keatinge (c.1761–1835), Irish landowner, soldier and politician
- Paffard Keatinge-Clay (1926–2023), British-born architect
- Richard Harte Keatinge (1825–1904), Irish Lieutenant General and Victoria Cross recipient
- William Keatinge (1869–1934), English Catholic prelate
