= Ingrid Stölzel =

German composer of contemporary classical music

Ingrid Stölzel (German: [ˈɪŋɾɪt ˈʃtœlt͡səl]; born 14 January 1971) is a German, U.S.-based composer of contemporary classical music. She has received critical acclaim for her vocal, chamber, and orchestral compositions.

== Biography ==
Ingrid Stölzel was born in Karlsruhe, Germany in 1971. She holds degrees in music from the University of Missouri, Kansas City, Conservatory of Music and Dance (Doctorate of Musical Arts in Composition; Bachelor of Music) and the University of Hartford - Hartt School of Music (Master of Music in Composition). Her principal composition teachers include Robert Carl, James Mobberley, James Sellars, Chen Yi and Zhou Long. Stölzel is Associate Professor of Music Composition at the University of Kansas School of Music in Lawrence, Kansas

== Music ==
Composer Ingrid Stölzel has been described as having “a gift for melody”(San Francisco Classical Voice) and “evoking a sense of longing” that creates “a reflective and serene soundscape that makes you want to curl up on your windowsill to re-listen on a rainy day.” Her music has been described as “tender and beautiful” (American Record Guide) and as creating a “haunting feeling of lyrical reflection and suspension in time and memory” (Classical-Modern Review). At the heart of her compositions is a belief that "music can create profound emotional connections with the listener."

Awards for her compositions include the Academy Music Art Theatre Award (Italy), Winds Composition Contest Saxony, Dresdner Bläserphilharmonie (Germany), U.S. Army Band "Pershing's Own" Chamber Music Composition Competition, Scheherazade Music Festival (USA), the Suzanne and Lee Ettelson Composer's Award (USA), the RED NOTE Composition Competition, Robert Avalon International Competition for Composers (USA), Kaleidoscope Chamber Orchestra Competition, Ortus International New Music Competition, Cayuga Chamber Orchestra Composers Competition, Arizona Pro Arte Competition and NewMusic@ECU Composition Competition, among others.

== List of Works ==
Orchestral Works

- City Beautiful (2019)
- Comet Coggia (2024)
- Genius Loci – Spirit of Place (2009 rev. 2024)
- Into the Blue (2003)
- Musica Ignota (2023)
- Soul Journey (2016) for mezzo-soprano and orchestra

Band and Wind Ensemble Works

- Echo of the Past (2025) for wind dectet Instrumentation: 2 flutes, 2 oboes, 2 clarinets, 2 bassoons, 2 horns
- Into the Blue (2003/2018) for concert band
- Musica Ignota (2020) for concert band
- Panta Rhei (2010) for wind ensemble

Vocal Chamber Music / Art Songs

- The Gorgeous Nothings (2016) — for soprano, flute, oboe, and piano; Text: fragments of poetry by Emily Dickinson
- Soul Journey – Three Whitman Songs (2014) — for mezzo-soprano and piano; Text: Walt Whitman, Leaves of Grass
- The Shelter (2016) — for soprano, cello, and piano; Text: Emily Dickinson
- To One Beyond Seas (2018) — for soprano, violin, and piano; Text: Emily Pauline Johnson
- Livid Loneliness of Fear (2019) — for mezzo-soprano, flute, clarinet, violin, cello, and percussion; Text: Amelia Earhart
- Silent Music of Infinity (2021) — for soprano and piano; Text: Sara Teasdale
- Mondspiel (2022) — for soprano, flute, clarinet, viola, and cello; Texts: “Der Mond ist aufgegangen” — Matthias Claudius; “Verstohlen geht der Mond auf” — Anton Wilhelm von Zuccalmaglio
- Three Silent Things (2023) — for mezzo-soprano and cello; Text: Adelaide Crapsey

Choral Works

- Field of Dreams (2023) — for SATB chorus a cappella; Text: Jo-Anne van der Vat-Chromy
- Light the World (2017) — for SATB chorus a cappella; Text: Robert Bode
- Into Being (2011) — for SATB chorus a cappella; Text: Sanskrit mantra “So ham ham sa”
- Soledá (2024) — choral work published in the Asturian Choral Anthology – Music of the XXI for the XXI

Solo Works

- A Dome of Many-Coloured Glass (2024) — for solo double bass
- In Fremden Ländern (In Foreign Lands) (2023) — for solo piano
- Unus Mundus (2017) — for solo piano
- Zwischenraum (2016) — for solo B♭ clarinet (also available for solo alto saxophone)
- In the Midst (2013) — for solo piano
- Spur of the Moment (2000) — for solo piano

Chamber Works

Duos

- Anders als die Andern (Different from the Others) (2024) — soprano saxophone (or B♭ clarinet) and piano
- Leonardo Saw the Spring (2019) — flute and piano
- Von Fern und Nah — two guitars
- here there (2006) — violin and piano (also versions for viola or cello and piano)
- Two-Letter Words (2005) — bass clarinet/clarinet and marimba/vibraphone
- I Breathed a Song (2023) — flute and cello
- With Eyes Open (2015) — alto saxophone and piano

Trios

- A Thought Went Up My Mind Today (2026) — oboe, bassoon, and piano
- Fides, Spes (2022) — string trio
- For the Time Being (2011) — flute, English horn, and piano
- The Road is All (2007) — piano trio
- Wider than the Sky (2020) — oboe, viola, and piano
- There are Things to Be Said (2009) — flute, oboe, and piano
- Loveliness Extreme (2007) — clarinet, viola, and piano
- The Voice of the Rain (2018) — flute, cello, and percussion
- The Voice of the Rain (2025) — flute, viola, and harp

Quartets and Larger Chamber Ensembles

- Where the Sun of Freedom Shines (2021) — flute, clarinet, horn, violin, viola, cello, and vibraphone
- Livid Loneliness of Fear (2019) — mezzo-soprano, flute, clarinet, violin, cello, and percussion
- The Gorgeous Nothings (2016) — soprano, flute, oboe, and piano (alternate instrumentations available)
- The More Things Change (2012) — clarinet, violin, cello, piano, and percussion
- Loveliness Extreme (2007) — clarinet, violin, cello, and piano

== External Link ==
Official Website: www.ingridstolzel.com

Recordings: https://www.navonarecords.com/artists/ingrid-stolzel/

Full Discography: https://ingridstolzel.com/discography
