= Walter Spence (priest) =

Cleric

Walter Cyril Spence (1919 - 2009) was Dean of Tuam from 1966 to 1981.

Corbett was born in 1919, educated at Trinity College, Dublin and ordained in 1943. After a curacies in Maghera and Roscommon he held incumbencies at Ballysumaghan and Tubbercurry before his appointment as Dean.

He died on 6 November 2009.
