= Jay Batzner =

American classical composer

J. C. Batzner is a composer primarily of electronic music and is a currently on the faculty of Central Michigan University. Jay Batzner is also the programming director for Electronic Music Midwest He ran a daily podcast about miniatures He wrote the music for Carla Poindexter's Carnival Daring Do His 10-minute opera Secrets & Waffles debuted in Carnegie Hall with the Remarkable Theater Brigade's Opera Shorts in 2010. Batzner's work was also part of several 60x60 mixes including the Sanguine Mix, Order of Magnitude Mix, 2009 International Mix, Evolution Mix (part I), 2005 Midwest Mix. In 2012, Jay Batzner brought 60x60 Dance with his colleague Heather Trommer-Beardslee to Central Michigan University

== Discography ==
- Quills and Jacks of Outrageous Fortune 60x60 2005 CD Vox Novus
- Sonance: New Music for Piano
