= Robert Plunket =

Anglican priest in Ireland

- Born: 11 May 1802; Dublin, Ireland
- Died: 13 May 1867 (aged 65); Monkstown, Dublin, Ireland
- Education: Trinity College Dublin
- Occupation: Church of Ireland priest
- Known for: Archdeacon of Killala (1847–1850), Dean of Tuam (1850–1867)

Robert Plunket (Dublin, 11 May 1802 – Monkstown, Dublin, 13 May 1867) was a Church of Ireland priest in Ireland during the 19th century.

Burke was educated at Trinity College Dublin. He was Archdeacon of Killala from 1847 to 1850; and Dean of Tuam from then until his death.
