= Joshua Berkeley =

Anglican priest

Joshua Berkeley (2 January 1743 – 18 June 1807) was an Anglican priest in Ireland during the late decade of the 18th century and the first four of the 19th.

Berkeley was born in Derry and educated at Westminster School and Christ Church, Oxford He was Dean of Tuam from 1782 until his death.

There is a monument to Berkeley within Bristol Cathedral. It is by James Sargant Storer.
