= Daniel le Tablere =

Irish Anglican cleric

Daniel le Tablere (1710 - 1775) was an Anglican priest in Ireland during the late decade of the 18th century and the first four of the 19th.

He was born in Dublin and educated at Trinity College, Dublin. He was appointed Prebendary of Kildare Cathedral in 1749; Prebendary of St Patrick's Cathedral, Dublin in 1759 and Dean of Tuam in 1759, holding all three positions until his death.
