= Anthony Previté =

Irish Anglican clergyman (born 1941)

Anthony Michael Allen Previté (born 1941) was Dean of Tuam then Archdeacon of Tuam in the last quarter of the 20th century and the first decade of the 21st.

Previté was born in 1941, and ordained in 1989. After a curacy in Galway he was the incumbent at Omey from 1991 until 1993; Dean of St Mary's Cathedral, Tuam from 1993 until 1996; and Archdeacon of Tuam from 1996 until 2006.
