= John Nash (priest) =

John Francis Maurice Nash was Archdeacon of Tuam from 1950 until 1956.

Nash was born on 5 December 1879, educated at Trinity College, Dublin and ordained in 1904. After a curacies at Kilmoremoy and Knockainy he returned to Kilmoremoy as rector. He was rector of Galway from 1925 and rural dean of Tuam from 1944.
