= Rupert Harris =

Irish Anglican clergyman

Venerable Rupert Gustavus Musgrave Harris (1913 – 16 April 1990) was an Irish Anglican clergyman who was the Archdeacon of Tuam from 1970 until 1980.

Harris was born in 1913, educated at Trinity College, Dublin and ordained in 1938. After a curacy at Shankhill he was a chaplain to the Forces during World War II. He held Incumbencies at Cloone, Castlebar, Galway and Athenry. He was Precentor of St Mary's Cathedral, Tuam from 1960 until his appointment as Archdeacon.

Harris died in Galway on 16 April 1990, at the age of 76.
