= Arthur Chichester (disambiguation) =

Arthur Chichester, 1st Baron Chichester (1563–1625) was an English administrator and Lord Deputy of Ireland

Arthur Chichester may also refer to:

- Arthur Chichester, 1st Earl of Donegall (1606–1675)
- Arthur Chichester, 2nd Earl of Donegall (died 1678)
- Arthur Chichester, 3rd Earl of Donegall (1666–1706)
- Arthur Chichester, 1st Marquess of Donegall (1739–1799)
- Patrick Chichester, 8th Marquess of Donegall (Arthur Patrick Chichester, born 1952)
- Sir Arthur Chichester, 1st Baronet (c.1769–1847), Irish politician
- Arthur Chichester (MP for Honiton) (1777–1866)
- Arthur Chichester, 1st Baron Templemore (1797–1837)
- Arthur Chichester, 4th Baron Templemore (1880–1953)
- Lord Arthur Chichester (1808–1840)
- Arthur Chichester, pen name of the author Benjamin Rich

== See also ==
- Chichester (disambiguation)
