= William O'Connell (priest) =

William Morgan O'Connell was Archdeacon of Tuam from 1928 until 1939.

O'Connell was educated at Trinity College, Dublin and ordained in 1892. After a curacy at Drumshambo he was the incumbent at Drumreilly, Aasleagh, Clifden and Omey. He was Rural Dean of Galway from 1907 to 1916; Prebendary of Kilmainmore in Tuam Cathedral Galway from 1925; and Precentor of Tuam from 1925 to 1928 and Rural Dean of Tuam from 1944.
