= William Grant (priest) =

Irish priest (1929–2009)

William James Grant (1929–2009) was archdeacon, then dean of Tuam, in the Church of Ireland in the last quarter of the 20th century.

Grant was born in 1929, and ordained in 1959. After curacies in Ballymacarrett and Belfast he was the incumbent at Grand Falls from 1963 until 1966; and Assistant Chaplain to the Dublin branch of the Mission to Seamen. He was the incumbent at Fethard from 1970 until 1977 when he became Domestic Chaplain to the Bishop of Tuam. He was appointed Archdeacon of Tuam in 1980; and Dean of St Mary's Cathedral, Tuam a year later, holding both positions until 1993.
