= Thomas Carter (Dean of Tuam) =

Anglican priest

Thomas Carter was an Anglican priest in Ireland during the 19th-century.

Carter was born in Dublin and educated at Trinity College there. He was appointed Prebendary of Tandragee in Armagh Cathedral in 1803; and the Dean of Tuam in 1813. He died of cholera on 19 August 1849, and was buried at his prebendal church.
