= Paul Bunyan (film) =

- Directed by: Les Clark
- Story by: Lance Nolley; Ted Berman
- Produced by: Walt Disney
- Starring: Thurl Ravenscroft; Dal McKennon
- Narrated by: Parley Baer
- Music by: George Bruns
- Animation by: John Sibley; George Nicholas; Bob Youngouist; George Goepper; Fred Kopietz; Ken Hultgren; Jerry Hathcock; Jack Parr; Jack Boyd (effects animation)
- Layouts by: Homer Jonas; Jack Huber
- Backgrounds by: Walt Peregoy
- Production company: Walt Disney Productions
- Distributed by: Buena Vista Distribution
- Release date: August 1, 1958
- Running time: 17 minutes
- Country: United States
- Language: English

Paul Bunyan is a 1958 American animated musical short film produced by Walt Disney Productions. The short was based on the North American folk hero and lumberjack Paul Bunyan and was inspired after meeting with Les Kangas of Paul Bunyan Productions, who gave Disney the idea for the film. The film was directed by Les Clark, a member of Disney's Nine Old Men of core animators. Thurl Ravenscroft starred as the voice of Paul Bunyan. Supporting animators on the project included Lee Hartman.

Paul Bunyan received an Academy Award nomination for Best Animated Short of 1958, losing to the Looney Tunes cartoon Knighty Knight Bugs, starring Bugs Bunny and Yosemite Sam.

DTV sets clips of the short to Annette Funicello's Tall Paul and is featured in an episode of Sing Me a Story with Belle.

== Plot ==
Following a violent windstorm on the coast of Maine, lumberjack Cal McNab spots a giant cradle washed up on the beach containing a giant baby boy. The lumbering-town adopts and raises the boy, giving him the name Paul Bunyan. One Christmas, the town gives Paul a double-bladed axe to help chop down timber. Paul's work clears open land and allows for the town's expansion of buildings, but Paul is too big for it and decides to move out west.

Paul continues to help clear land for farmers in the midwest. During a fierce blizzard, Paul rescues a giant flash-frozen ox that had turned blue from the cold. Paul adopts the ox and names him Babe. During the following spring, Paul and Babe's footprints through the snow filled up with water and became known as the "Land of 10,000 Lakes". Paul eventually clears the trees from North Dakota and South Dakota, digs the Missouri River to flow the logs downstream to the sawmills, and builds Pike's Peak as a lookout. He creates the Grand Tetons while playing rough with Babe, and makes Yellowstone Falls as a shower bath.

Paul's work opens up the American west to trade; soon a slick-talking salesman named Joe Muffaw encourages the loggers to "get with the times and become modern" by using steam-powered chainsaws to cut trees, and a steam train to transport the timber (up until this point Babe would haul the timber to the river on a wooden sled). Paul protests that nothing can replace the heart and soul of himself and Babe, while Joe counters that his steam-saw and engine can cut and haul more timber than any man or ox, and the two men decide to host a tournament with only one rule, that whoever creates the highest pile of lumber at the end of the contest will be declared the superior way. Paul and Joe work tirelessly throughout the tournament cutting down trees, with Babe furiously racing against the steam train. When time is up, the referee measures Paul Bunyan's pile as 240 feet, even and the men cheer. The referee then measures Joe's pile as 240 feet and one quarter inch, thus Joe wins. Paul and Babe despondently walk off into the sunset, never to return, but one of the men decides to record the legend of Paul Bunyan and Babe for posterity's sake. Some say they went up to Alaska, and that the Aurora Borealis is really just Paul and Babe playfully wrestling in the snow.

== Cast and crew ==
- Voice: Thurl Ravenscroft
- Chorus: The Mellomen
- Director: Les Clark
- Producer: Walt Disney
- Writers: Lance Nolley, Ted Berman
- Character animators: John Sibley, George Nicholas, Bob Youngquist, George Goepper, Fred Kopietz, Ken Hultgren, Jerry Hathcock, Jack Parr
- Music: George Bruns
- Lyrics: Tom Adair
- Art director: Eyvind Earle
- Additional voices:
  - Dal McKennon as Cal McNab
  - Parley Baer as Narrator / Chris Crosshaul
  - Ken Christy as Shot Gunderson
  - Bob Amsberry as Joe Muffaw

== Home media ==
The short was first released by Walt Disney Home video through VHS in March 1983 under the title "American Heroes". It has been released numerous times since which include December 6, 2005, on Walt Disney Treasures: Disney Rarities - Celebrated Shorts: 1920s–1960s.

Additional releases include:

- 1995: Favorite Stories: Paul Bunyan (VHS)
- 2002: Disney's American Legends (VHS and DVD)

== See also ==
- List of American films of 1958
