= Andrew Tait (priest) =

Irish priest

Andrew C. Tait FRSE was an Irish priest serving the Church of Ireland.

== Life ==
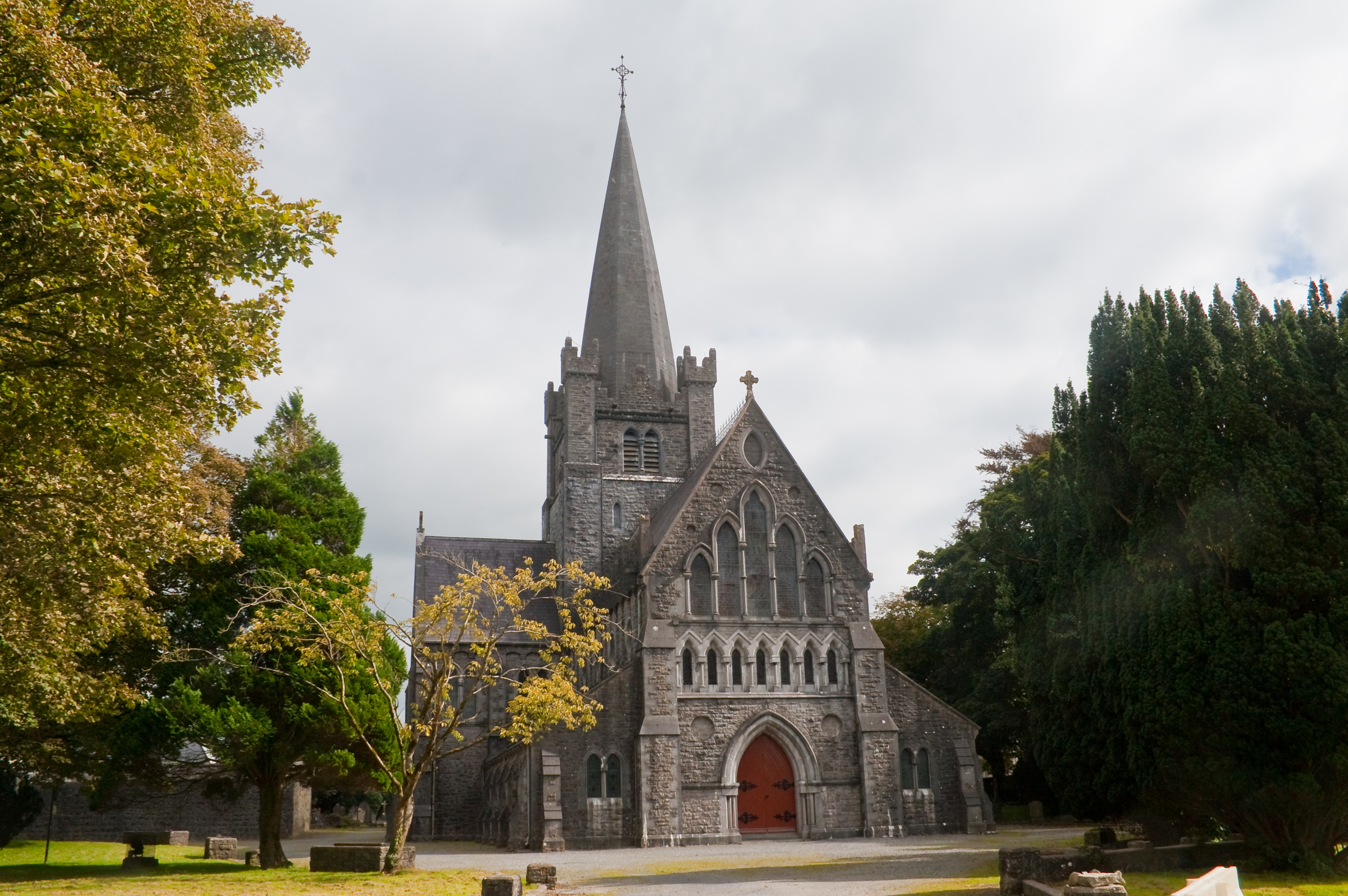
Tuam Cathedral

In 1871 he was Rector of Kilkerrin. In 1872 he was elected a Fellow of the Royal Society of Edinburgh. His proposer was William Thomson, Lord Kelvin. In Kilkerrin he was a member of the Irish Church Missions Society.

In the 1890s he was a member of the Royal Asiatic Society of Great Britain and Ireland.

He was appointed a Canon of St Patrick's Cathedral, Dublin in 1896. He had been Archdeacon of Tuam from then until 1898. He then succeeded William Chambers Townsend as Dean of Tuam in 1898, serving until 1904.

He was concurrently Rector of Moylough.

== Publications ==
- The Charter of Christianity (1887)
