= Isaac Gervais =

Irish Anglican priest

Isaac Gervais (1680-1756) was an Anglican priest in Ireland during the 18th century.

Gervais was educated at Trinity College, Dublin. He was Dean of Tuam from 1743 until his death.
