= Charles Warburton (priest) =

Charles Warburton (1780–1855) was Archdeacon of Tuam from 1808 until 1855.

The son of Bishop Charles Warburton he was born in New York, educated at Trinity College, Dublin. He was Chancellor of the Diocese of Limerick from 1813 until 1855; the incumbent at Drishane from 1815 to 1820, and then of Clonmel until his death.
