= James Chichester =

James Chichester may refer to:

- James Chichester, Earl of Belfast (born 1990)
- Sir James Chichester, 12th Baronet (born 1951) of the Chichester baronets

== See also ==
- James Chichester-Clark (1923–2002), Northern Irish politician
- James Lenox-Conyngham Chichester-Clark
- Chichester (surname)
