= Robert Johnson (bishop) =

Irish Anglican bishop

Robert Johnson was an Anglican bishop in Ireland during the mid-18th century.

Johnson was educated at Trinity College, Dublin. He was Rector of Dungannon until 1756 when he was appointed Dean of Tuam. In 1759 he became Bishop of Cloyne, a post he held until his death in January 1767.
