= John Cather =

Irish Anglican priest and teacher

John Cather (1814–1888) was an Irish Anglican priest and teacher.

Cather was born in County Tyrone, educated at Trinity College, Dublin. He was Rector of Crossboyne then Westport. Cather held the office of Archdeacon of Tuam from 1855 until his death on 15 May 1888.
