= Robert Clarke (priest) =

Anglican priest

Robert Clarke (1717-1782) was an Anglican priest in Ireland during the 18th Century.

Clarke was born in Drogheda and educated at Trinity College, Dublin. He was Dean of Tuam from 1775 until his death.
