= Gary Hastings =

Archdeacon of Tuam

The Venerable Gary Lea Hastings (born 1956) has been Archdeacon of Tuam since 2006.

Hastings was educated at the New University of Ulster and ordained in 1993. After a curacy in Galway he was the Incumbent of the Aughaval group from 1995 to 2012; and, during the same period, was also Domestic Chaplain to the Bishop of Tuam. He became a Canon of St Mary's Cathedral, Tuam in 2000; and, in 2010, of St Patrick's Cathedral, Dublin. He was Rector of Galway from 2010 to 2018. He was appointed to the parish of Holy Trinity, Killiney, County Dublin in 2018.
