= Kansas City Electronic Music and Arts Alliance =

The Kansas City Electronic Music and Arts Alliance (KcEMA) is a not-for-profit promoter of electroacoustic music, electronic music and electronic art in the Kansas City metro area.

== Mission ==
The Kansas City Electronic Music and Arts Alliance (KcEMA) was founded in 2007 to encourage and develop understanding and appreciation of electronic music and to create an expansive sense of community for electronic musicians and other artists in the Kansas City Area. KcEMA organizes concerts of electronic music and collaborative projects with generative and performing artists. KcEMA provides a forum for electronic musicians and artists in other media to collaborate, exchange ideas, and grow as an interactive, supportive community.

== Articles & Reviews ==
- "...intense, sensorially immersive, emotionally evocative, and thoroughly satisfying..." - Chamber Music Today
- "...a mind bending program of audio/visual imagination." - Megan Browne Helm, KCMetropolis.org
- "Top Ten of KC's 2009–10 season" - KCMetropolis.org
- "The whole performance was accomplished artistry undiminished by the unusual dimensions of sound and sight." - Paul Elias Taylor, El Dormido
- "One could say it was a healing of the wound between ‘fixed media’ and ‘live’ electroacoustic performance. The unity of the aesthetic effect of the musicians who performed live and the composers who engineered their fixed-media playback was among the best I’ve ever heard." - Chamber Music Today
- "KcEMA is a vital organization in the already rich artistic landscape of Kansas City. You owe it to yourself to seek out one of their shows" - Lee Hartman, KCMetropolis.org
- "...organic, arresting and spoke to the soul and human condition." - Lee Hartman, KCMetropolis.org
- "You might be surprised by the music’s emotionality, its sonic richness, its absolute abstract nature.." - Sarah Benson, ink Magazine

== Board of directors ==
- John Chittum, President
- Christina Butera, Vice President
- Cody Kauhl, Treasurer
- Eli Hougland, Secretary
- Stacy Busch, Public Relations
