= List of plays by Dorothy L. Sayers =

Dorothy L. Sayers, known as a novelist, also wrote the following plays:

- Busman's Honeymoon

Dorothy L. Sayers began writing plays for public performance in 1935 with Busman’s Honeymoon, a dramatic incarnation of the characters from her Lord Peter Wimsey books. She collaborated on this script with her friend from her college days at Oxford, M. St. Clare Byrne who was a lecturer at the Royal Academy of Dramatic Art. Busman’s Honeymoon opened in December 1936 at the Comedy Theatre in London. It was later worked into the last novel in the series, and published in 1937.

- The Zeal of Thy House

In 1936 Sayers was approached by Margaret Babington, organizer of the Canterbury Festival, to write a play for their 1937 Festival. This was prior to the production of Busman’s Honeymoon, but Sayers had been recommended to Babington by the festival's playwright of 1936, the poet Charles Williams. In 1934 the festival began honoring various professions each year, and the theme for 1937 was artists and craftsmen. It was also tradition that the subjects of the plays have something to do with the history of Canterbury Cathedral. Accordingly, Sayers’ script centered on William of Sens, the architect chosen to rebuild the cathedral's choir in 1174 after it was destroyed by fire. While completing the work on the choir, William of Sens suffered a crippling fall. Sayers’ plot hinged on the eyewitness account of Gervase the Monk who attributed the fall to "either the vengeance of God or the envy of the Devil." Based on this enigmatic line of Gervase’s, Sayers created a prideful William of Sens whose intrigue with the choir's benefactress leads inadvertently to the tragic accident. The title of the play was taken from Psalm 69:9, "For the zeal of thine house hath eaten me up." The Zeal of Thy House was presented at the Canterbury Festival June 12–18, 1937 with a cast of forty professional and amateur actors. Harcourt Williams co-directed and also played the role of William of Sens. Frank Napier was the other co-director and played the role of Theodatus. It was later produced in London at the Westminster Theatre in March 1938, and was revived at the Canterbury Festival in 1949.

- He That Should Come

He That Should Come is a one-act nativity play originally written for radio. Sayers' main concern was to portray the birth of Christ in a realistic, "crowded social and historical background." To this end, she used ordinary prose and insisted on everyday speech patterns with no tones of reverence. He That Should Come was originally broadcast on Christmas Day in 1938.

- The Devil To Pay

The Devil to Pay was also written for the Canterbury Festival and was presented at the festival in June 1939. For this script, Sayers used the Faust legend. Her problem was "a question of supplying some kind of human interpretation of a supernatural legend." The set for The Devil to Pay was relatively elaborate for festival productions and employed medieval mansions depicting heaven and hell at opposite ends of the stage with various locations between. Frank Napier co-directed this production as well as playing the role of Mephistopheles. Harcourt Williams appeared in the role of Faustus. The Devil to Pay was produced in July 1939 at His Majesty's Theatre in London and ran for four weeks.

- Love All

Love All was a stage comedy presented in April 1940 at the Torch Theatre in Knightsbridge. Its plot involves a romance writer, his mistress, and his wife who is a playwright and probably a depiction of Sayers herself. The writer has run off to Venice with his mistress, and the play opens as they begin to tire of each other. Both decide to sneak away to London and, of course, run into each other at his wife's flat. The wife has become a successful playwright in her husband's absence and has not had time to grant the divorce. The play discusses the issue of career versus family and ends with both women choosing work over a relationship with the writer. The play was not commercially successful.

- The Man Born to Be King

The Man Born to Be King is a radio drama based on the life of Jesus, produced and broadcast by the BBC during the Second World War. It is a play cycle consisting of twelve plays depicting specific periods in Jesus' life, from the events surrounding his birth to his death and resurrection. It was first broadcast by the BBC Home Service on Sunday evenings, beginning on 21 December 1941, with new episodes broadcast at 4-week intervals, ending on 18 October 1942.

- The Just Vengeance

The Just Vengeance was written for the Lichfield Cathedral Festival in 1946. The plot involves an Airman who has been shot down. His spirit returns to his home in Lichfield where he is shown the meaning of Atonement, his conversion takes place and he then enters heaven. The play was performed inside the cathedral which produced many acoustical challenges. Sayers attempted to assist the actors by using "formal and incantatory" speech.

- Where Do We Go from Here?

Where Do We Go from Here? was the closing play in a series of six half-hour radio plays written by members of the Detection Club to raise funds for the organisation. The first play in the series was Butter in a Lordly Dish by Agatha Christie. Where Do We Go from Here? was broadcast on 24 February 1948. It has never been published.

- The Emperor Constantine

The Emperor Constantine was written in 1951 for the Colchester Festival and portrays the Council of Nicaea during which the Nicene Creed was formed.
