= John Geddes (dean of Tuam) =

Anglican priest in Ireland

John Geddes was an Anglican priest in Ireland in the late nineteenth and early 20th centuries.

Colvin was educated at Trinity College, Dublin and ordained in 1889. He served curacies in Belfast and Dublin. He was the incumbent at Tubbercurry from 1895 to 1902; Archdeacon of Achonry from 1896 to 1902; Residential Canon at Tuam Cathedral from 1902 to 1904; and Dean of Tuam from 1904 to 1917.
