= John Keatinge =

Irish Anglican priest (1769–1817)

John William Keatinge, D.D. (b & d Dublin, 28 May 1769 – 6 May 1817) was an Irish Anglican priest.

Educated at The Queen's College, Oxford, he was the last Chaplain of the Irish House of Commons. He was Dean of Tuam from 1809 until 1810;Provost of Kilmacduagh from 1810 until 1813; and Dean of St Patrick's Cathedral, Dublin from 1810; until his death.
