= Archdeacon of Tuam =

Archdeaconate in Ireland

The Archdeacon of Tuam (/ˈtjuːəm/ TEW-əm) was a post held in the Diocese of Tuam, from the creation of the diocese at the Synod of Rathbreasail in 1111.

== Background ==
In the Catholic Church, the post of archdeacon, generally a priest, was once one of great importance as a senior official of a diocese. It has fallen into disuse, and its duties are now part of the work of such officials as the auxiliary and/or coadjutor bishops, the vicar general, the episcopal vicar, and the vicar forane/dean/archpriest.

After the Reformation, there were parallel successions, one Church of Ireland, the other Roman Catholic.

== Roman Catholic ==
- 1201–23: Alan.
- 1231: Stephen Ó Breen.
- 1233: Christian.
- 1243: Maol Eoin Ó Crechain Archdeacon of Tuam, after his return from beyond the sea as a Professor, died in Dublin.
- 1244: The Archdeacon of Tuam was drowned in Glass Linn in Cluain, near Tuam.
- 1266: Thomas Ó Maol Chonaire. He was a member of the distinguished family of O'Malconry, who for many generations were hereditary historians and bards of the kingdom of Connacht.
- 1289–1306: Phillip le Blount, or le Blond. In 1297 he was Commissary of the Archbishop; in which capacity he engaged in a fierce quarrel with the Dominican friars of Athenry, a full account of which may be seen in Harri's Ware, p. 609. He was still Archdeacon in 1306.
- 13??: Seoán Ó Leaáin, in 1332 bip. clonfert.
- c.1400: John Ó Ceallaigh.
- 1499: William de Bermingham, Archdeacon, died 26 December 1499.
- 1523: Phelim.
- 1536–73: Vacant, the revenues been usurped by Thomas de Burgo.

== Church of Ireland ==
- 1615: Moriarty Hanyn, a man able to teach in Irish. Held the prebend of Kilmeen.
- 1622: Florence Kelly, M.A. Held prebend of Kilmoylan.
- 16??-1662: John Woolhouse or Woodhouse, died 1662.
- 1662-?: Dudley Persse, B.D., Dean of Kilmacduagh, Prebend of Clonfert, collated Archdeacon 2 October * 1662–1700?: In 1663 he obtained the Prebend of Tysaxon, Athenry. Held all till his death in 1699 or 1700.
- 1700–1703: Sir Thomas Vesey, 1st Baronet, M.A. son of Dr. Vesey, Archbishop of Tuam, born in County Cork. (Archdeacon as of 25 June 1700, resigned in 1703. Later Bishop of Killaloe, 1813)
- 1703–1706: Edward Chichester, M.A.
- 1706–1731: Theodore Maurice, M.A.
- 1731–1743: Nicholas Synge, M.A. Son of Dr. E. Synge, Archbishop of Tuam. (afterwards Archdeacon of Dublin 1743 and, in 1745, Bishop of Killaloe.
- 1743–1745: Gabriel James Maturin D.D. (afterwards Dean of St Patrick's Cathedral 1745)
- 1746–1771: John Crampton
- 1771–1805: Edward Burton (afterwards Dean of Killala 1805)
- 1806: Thomas Vesey Dawson
- 1806–1855: Charles Warburton
- 1855–1888: John Cather
- 1888–1890:James O'Sullivan (afterwards Bishop of Tuam, 1890)
- 1890
- 1896–1898: Andrew Tait
- 1898–1928: James Treanor
- 1928–1939: William O'Connell
- 1939–1950: George Nixon
- 1950–1956: John Nash
- 1956–1969: Rowland Blennerhassett
- 1970–1980: Rupert Harris
- 1980–1993: William Grant (also Dean of Tuam, 1981–93)
- 1996–2006: Anthony Previté
- 2006–present: Gary Hastings

== See also ==
- Dean of Tuam
