= George Nixon (cricketer) =

Indian-born English civil servant and cricketer

- Born: 11 August 1850; British India
- Died: 1913; Canada
- Occupation: Civil Service
- Known for: Cricketer

George Tait St Aubyn Nixon (11 August 1850 – February 1913) was an Indian-born English cricketer who played first-class cricket for Middlesex, Cambridge University and a side representing the "Gentlemen of the South". He was born at Neermuck in the Rajputana, India and died at Lintlaw, Saskatchewan, Canada. The precise date of his death is not known.

Nixon was educated at Rossall School and matriculated at Trinity Hall, Cambridge in 1869; there is no evidence that he read for a degree at Cambridge University and from 1870 to 1897 he is recorded as being employed by the public works department of the Indian Civil Service in Bengal.

As a cricketer, Nixon was a right-handed batsman; he also kept wicket in some games and was a round-arm slow bowler, though he did not bowl in first-class matches. He made his first-class debut as a batsman for Middlesex in 1868 and the following year, again playing only as a batsman, he scored 54, his only innings of note, in a match against Surrey. At Cambridge in 1870, he was tried as a wicketkeeper in a single match against the Marylebone Cricket Club but made only one stumping; a week later, he was recalled to the Cambridge side during the match against the Gentlemen of England as a replacement for an ill player and, allowed to keep wicket, made four stumpings and took two catches. He did not play for Cambridge University again and a single further appearance for Middlesex and one for a Gentlemen of the South side, both also in the 1870 season, were his final matches in first-class cricket.
