= Dean of Tuam =

Church of Ireland official

The Dean of Tuam (/ˈtjuːəm/ TEW-əm) is a post held in the Diocese of Tuam, as head of the cathedral chapter from after the creation of the diocese at the Synod of Rathbreasail in 1111.

== Background ==
A dean is often the chief resident cleric of a cathedral or other collegiate church and the head of the chapter of canons. Some cathedral chapters are headed by Archpriests, Provosts or (as in the mediaeval chapters of St David's and Llandaff until later reforms) a Precentor. If the cathedral or collegiate church has its own parish, the dean is now generally also rector of the parish. In the Church of Ireland dioceses of Clogher, Connor, and Dromore the roles are, however, often separated.

Since the Henrician Reformation, there have been parallel successions, one Church of Ireland, the other Roman Catholic.

== List of deans (Pre-Reformation) ==
- 1230 - Máel Muire Ó Lachtáin. Became archbishop in 1236. "He undertook a pilgrimage to Jerusalem, and committed an account of his travels to writing. He died at Athlone, shortly before Christmas, in the year 1249."
- 1282 - Constantine O'Dowd.
- 133? - Philip Hanlain, died 19 June 1339.
- 1339 - Denis Mac Áeda, son of Aedh Mac Áeda, succeeded. Possibly kinsman of Máel Sechlain Mac Áeda.
- 1394 - James.
- 1399 - James Caer, Carr, possibly the same person
- 1523 - Thomas.

== List of deans (Church of Ireland) ==
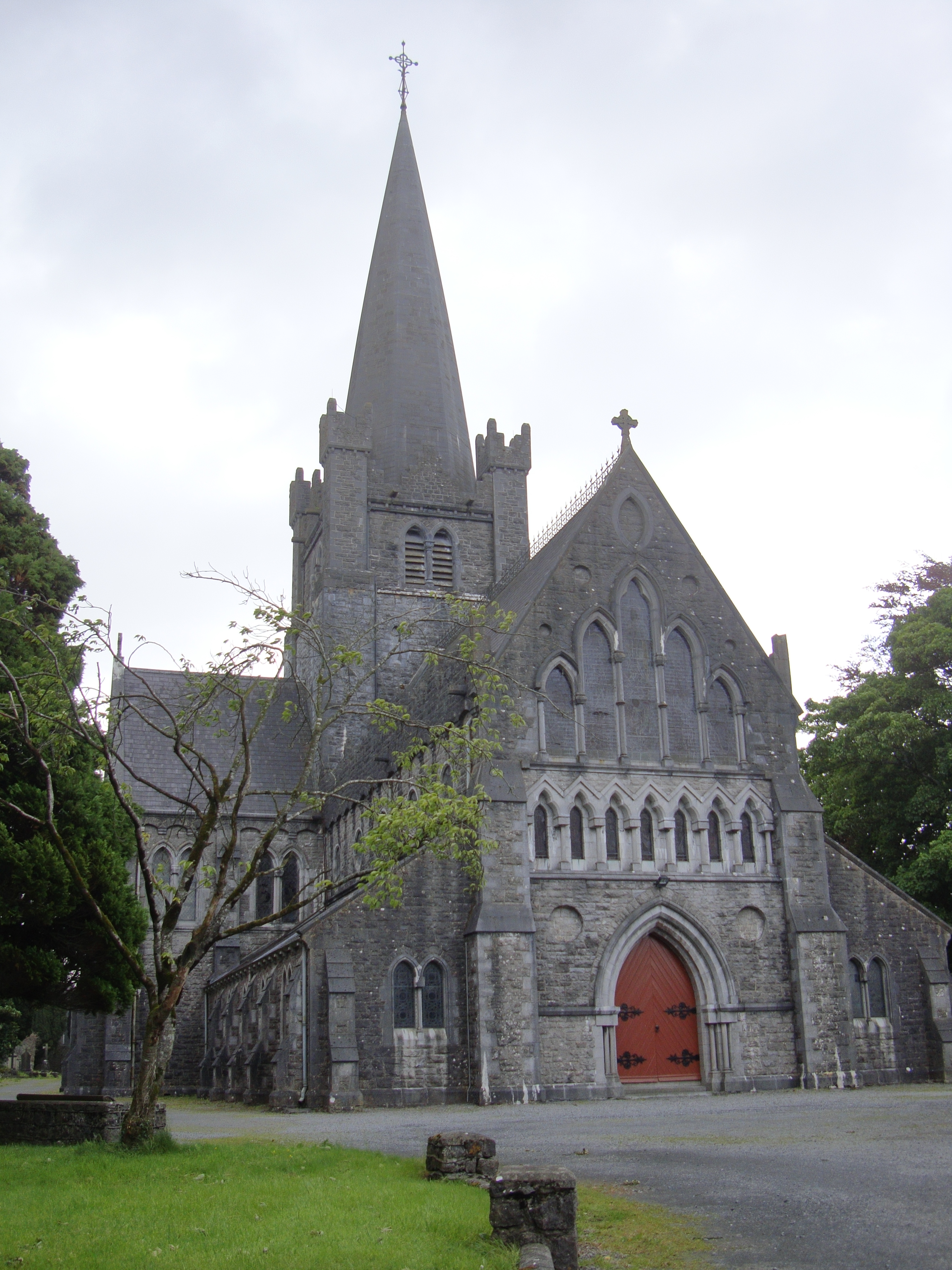
Tuam Cathedral of St Mary's

The Dean of Tuam is based at the Cathedral Church of St Mary in Tuam in the Diocese of Tuam within the united bishopric of Tuam, Killala and Achonry of the Church of Ireland.

- 1558–1573 - William O'Mullally (afterwards Archbishop of Tuam 1573)
- 1573 - Edward Browne
- ?1604–1605 - Richard Boyle
- 1609–1610 - Abel Walsh
- 1625–?1637 - Thomas Peyton
- 1638? - John King
- 1661 - William Buchanan
- 1669–1686 - James Wilson
- 1686–1712 - Robert Echlin (murdered 1712)
- 1712 - John Hinton and/or Thomas Butler.
- 1716 - William White? (also Dean of Kilfenora 1716)
- 1724 - Jonathan Bruce? (also Dean of Kilfenora 1724)
- 1732 - 1740 Edmund Bray
- ?–1743 __ Hinton
- 1743–1756 - Isaac Gervais
- 1756–1759 - Robert Johnson (afterwards Bishop of Cloyne 1759)
- 1759–1775 - Daniel le Tablere
- 1775–1782 - Robert Clarke
- 1782–1807 - Joshua Berkeley
- 1807–1808 - James Mahon (afterwards Dean of Dromore 1808)
- 1809–1810 - John William Keatinge (afterwards Dean of St Patrick's Cathedral 1810)
- 1810–1813 - Richard Bourne (afterwards Chancellor of Armagh, 1813)
- 1813–1849 - Thomas Carter
- 1850–1867 - Hon Robert Plunket
- 1867–1878 - Charles Henry Seymour
- 1879–1898 - William Chambers Townsend
- 1898–1904 - Andrew C. Tait
- 1904–1917 - John Geddes
- 1917–1923 - John Orr (afterwards Bishop of Tuam, Killala and Achonry 1923)
- 1945–1965 - Joseph Jackson
- 1966–1981 - Walter Cyril Spence
- 1981–1993 - William James Grant
- 1993–1996 - Anthony Previté
- 1997–1999 - Ian Deighton Corbett
- 2000–2022 - Alistair John Grimason
- 2024–present - Diane Margaret Matchett

== See also ==
The Chapter of St Mary's Cathedral, Tuam consists, in addition to the Dean: a Provost, Lynda Peilow (since 2020); an Archdeacon, Gary Hastings (since 2007), and the Prebendaries of Balla, held by the Provost (since 2010); of Faldown & Kilmainmore, held by the Archdeacon; of Kilmeen & Kilmoylan, Doris Clements (since 2011); of Taghsaxon & Laccagh, Maureen Ryan (2005); and of Killybegs, which is vacant.

- Archdeacon of Tuam

== Sources ==
- Fasti ecclesiæ hibernicæ: the succession of the prelates and members of the Cathedral bodies in Ireland - Volume 4 |accessdate= 2012-01-08
