= Robert Chichester =

Robert Chichester may refer to:

- Robert Chichester (politician) (1873–1921), Irish soldier and politician
- Sir Robert Chichester (died 1627) (1578–1627), Deputy Lieutenant of Devon

== See also ==
- Robert of Chichester (died c. 1161), bishop of Exeter
