= Ian Corbett =

Irish Anglican cleric

Ian Deighton Corbett was Dean of Tuam from 1997 to 1999.

Corbett was born in 1942, educated at St Catharine's College, Cambridge and Westcott House Cambridge and ordained in 1969.

After a curacy in Bury he was Chaplain at Bolton Polytechnic. He was the Diocese of Manchester's further education officer from 1974 to 1983 and rector of St John Chrysostom, Victoria Park, from 1975 to 1980. He was the chaplain of Salford Polytechnic from 1980 to 1983; and rector of Sacred Trinity, Salford from 1983 to 1987. While working in the Diocese of Manchester, he was a member of the Campaign for Homosexual Equality, the Gay Liberation Front and the Gay Christian Movement. He was warden of Lelapa la Jesu Sem Lesotho from 1988 to 1991; a missionary in Zimbabwe then Botswana from 1991 until 1995. When in Botswana, he helped establish an HIV/AIDS hospice in Gaborone. He was rector of St Mary, Kuruman, from 1995 to 1997. After his time as dean, he was rector of White Sands, Alberta from 1999 until 2001, when he moved to work in Utah. He retired in 2008. He is now an honorary curate in Clevedon.
