= Alistair Grimason =

Clergyman. Dean of Tuam (1957–2022)

Alistair John Grimason (1957 - 29 November 2022) was an Anglican priest who was Dean of Tuam from 2000 to his death in 2022.

Alistair Grimason was born in 1957, and was educated at the Church of Ireland Theological College. He was ordained deacon in 1979 and priest in 1980. After curacies in Belfast and Drumcondra he was the incumbent at Navan from 1984 until 1991. He was then the Information Officer for the Diocese of Meath until 1996. He was at Tullamore until 2000 and his appointment as Dean. He died in office in 2022, aged 65.
