= Grímsson =

Grímsson is a surname of Icelandic origin, meaning son of Grímur. In Icelandic names, the name is not strictly a surname, but a patronymic. The name refers to:

- Grímur Grímsson, member of the Icelandic parliament
- Lárus Halldór Grímsson (b. 1954), Icelandic musician, composer, and conductor
- Ólafur Ragnar Grímsson (b. 1943), Icelandic politician; President of Iceland since 1996
- Stefán Hörður Grímsson (1919–2002), Icelandic poet
