= James Treanor =

The Venerable James Treanor was Archdeacon of Tuam from 1898 until 1928.

Treanor educated at Trinity College, Dublin and ordained in 1870. After a curacy at Tuam he held Incumbencies at Athenry, Kiltullagh, Galway and Ballinrobe. He was Precentor of St Mary's Cathedral, Tuam from 1890 until his appointment as Archdeacon.
