= Edward Chichester (priest) =

The Ven and Hon. Edward Chichester was an Irish Anglican priest.

He was one of seven children and four sons born to Arthur Chichester, 2nd Earl of Donegall, and his wife, Jane Etchingham.

He was ordained deacon at Belfast in 1699; and priest at Lisburn the following year. He was collated Archdeacon of Tuam on 10 July 1703 and resigned on 12 September 1706.
