= Grimson =

Grimson is a surname which may refer to:

- Allan Grimson (born 1958), British murderer
- Eric Grimson (born 1953), Canadian-born computer scientist, professor at Massachusetts Institute of Technology
- George Grimson (1915–1944), Royal Air Force bomber crewman
- Gudmunder Grimson (1878–1965), American lawyer, Justice of North Dakota Supreme Court
- Jane Grimson (born 1949), Scottish-born computer engineer, Pro-Chancellor of University of Dublin
- Matthew Grimson (1968–2018), Canadian musician
- Stu Grimson (born 1965), Canadian professional ice hockey player
- Grimson, a family of musicians that flourished in London from 1870
- Grimson, Swedish/American rock band

== See also ==
- Gimson, surname
