= Gimson (company) =

Spanish bicycle and motorcycle company

Gimbernat Hermanos, S.R.C.
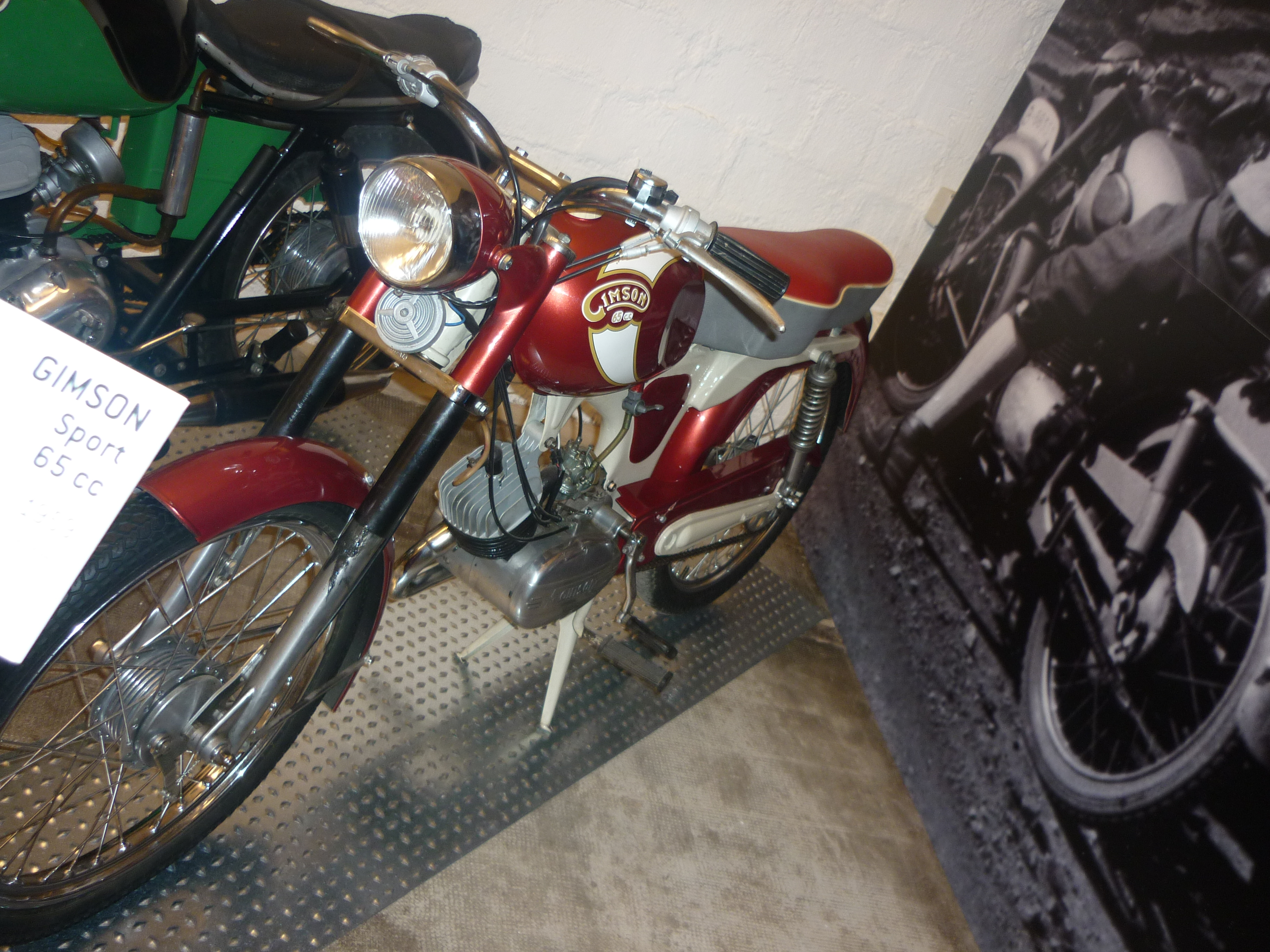
- Trade name: Gimson, Esbelta
- Industry: Bicycle, Motorcycle
- Founded: 1930
- Founder: Pierre Gimbernat i Batlle
- Defunct: 1982
- Successor: Beneti
- Headquarters: Figueres, Catalonia, Spain
- Key people: Pierre Gimbernat i Font (CEO); Pere Gimbernat i Quintana (Engineer)
- Products: Bicycles, Motorcycles, Mopeds
- Number of employees: circa 100

Gimson was a Spanish bicycle and motorcycle brand, manufactured in Figueres by Gimbernat Hermanos S.R.C. in two distinct stages: the first in 1930 (producing a total amount of six) and the second from 1955 to 1982.

== History ==
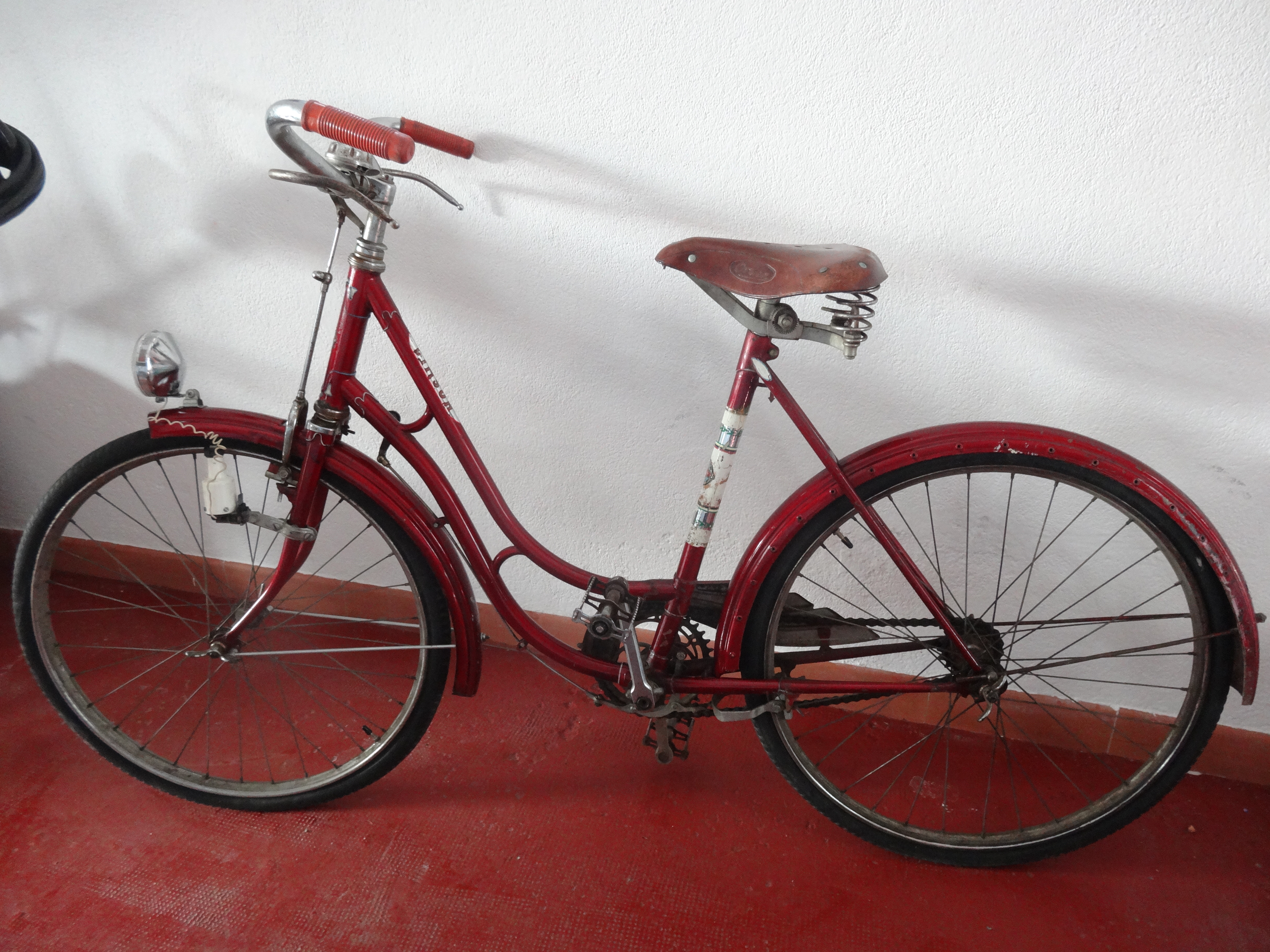
Gimson bicycle for a young lady.

=== Beginnings ===
Early in the 20th century, Pierre Gimbernat i Batlle, a renowned clockmaker from Perpignan, obtained the distribution license for French manufacturer Automoto for the Province of Girona. Gimbernat moved to Figueres, where he founded a small shop at 17th Sant Pau street. At first, he sold and repaired clocks and bicycles, also importing and selling bicycle spare parts. After some time, he decided to sell all this material and parts under his own brand, which he named Gimson.

=== Brand name ===
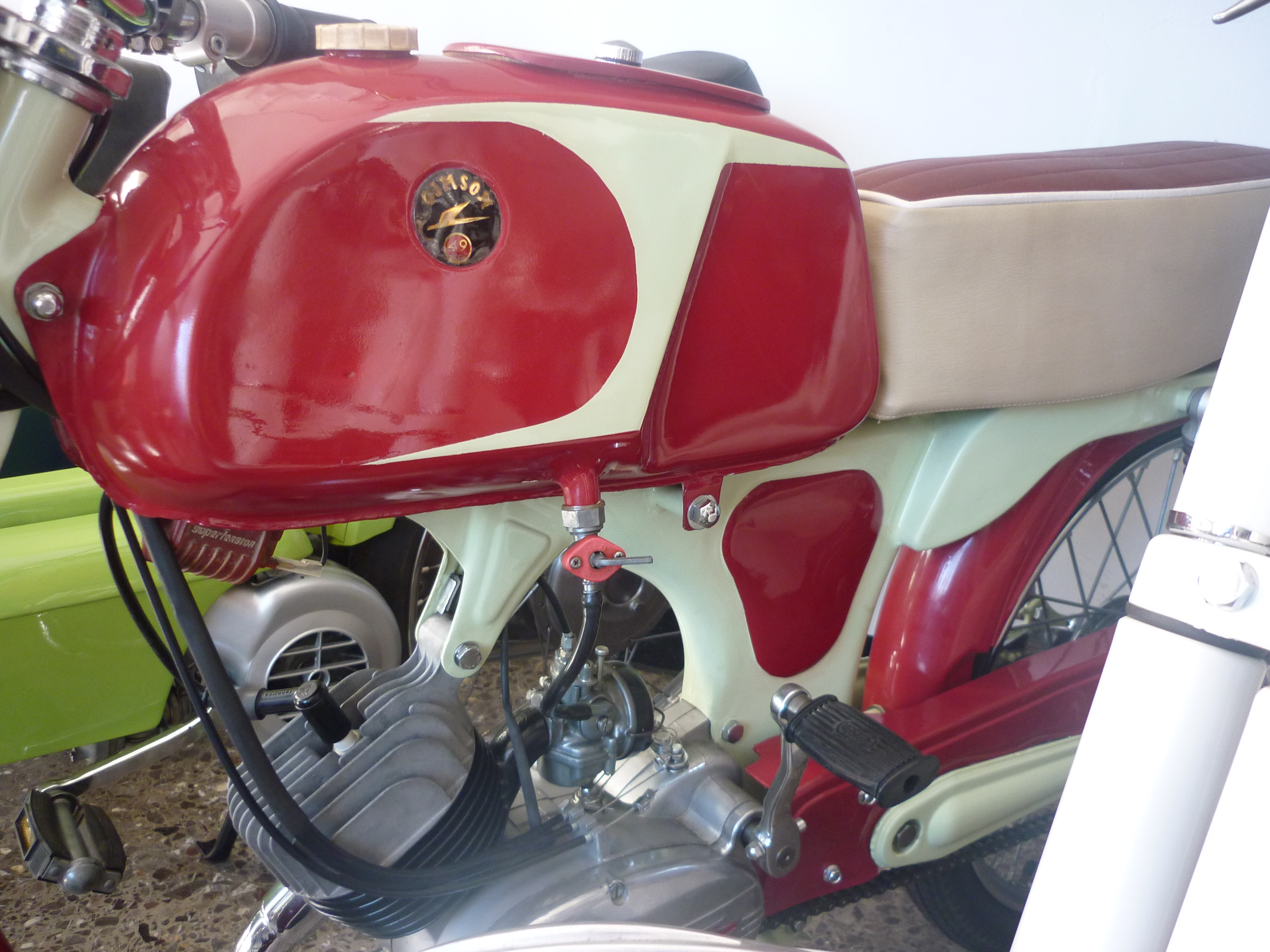
Tank Logo 49cc

Gimson was an acronym for Gimbernat and Sons, a name that included Pierre Gimbernat and his three children: Pierre, Antoine and Françoise. A few years later they changed the business name to Gimbernat Hermanos, SRC. The company was always a family business. The main tasks were distributed to the three children of the founder: Pierre Gimbernat i Font, eldest brother, was the chief Engineer, Antoine was at the production department and Françoise was in the office, at the sales department.

As an anecdote, Pierre Gimbernat i Font attended drawing lessons with the distinguished professor Juan Núñez Fernández, where Salvador Dalí was a classmate. His parents thought that the fantasies of the future painter would be a bad influence on their son, thus they sent him to Mataro for a while, to live with a businessman who produced spokes for Gimson bicycles, to keep him away from distractions.

=== Business consolidation ===
With the outbreak of the First World War and, after, the Spanish Civil War, Gimbernat was able to survive both economic conditions because their suppliers were small workshops nearby. Thanks to the experience gained and good results with bicycles, in the mid-fifties they began manufacturing their first mopeds, starting by mounting the Gamo engine made in Barcelona by the renowned Parés brothers.

The company achieved a big commercial success and ended up having more than a hundred employees. Its main market was a part of Catalonia, North east Spain. The Gimbernats came up with a second brand for their bicycles named Esbelta, meaning slim, to have two distributors in the same place and a better control of the market. At one point, Gimson won a contest to provide bicycles to the Spanish Civil Guard, before the unit was equipped with Sanglas motorcycles. These bicycles were used to patrol the countryside, and were the standard model, fitted with a special support to place the rifle.

=== Third generation ===
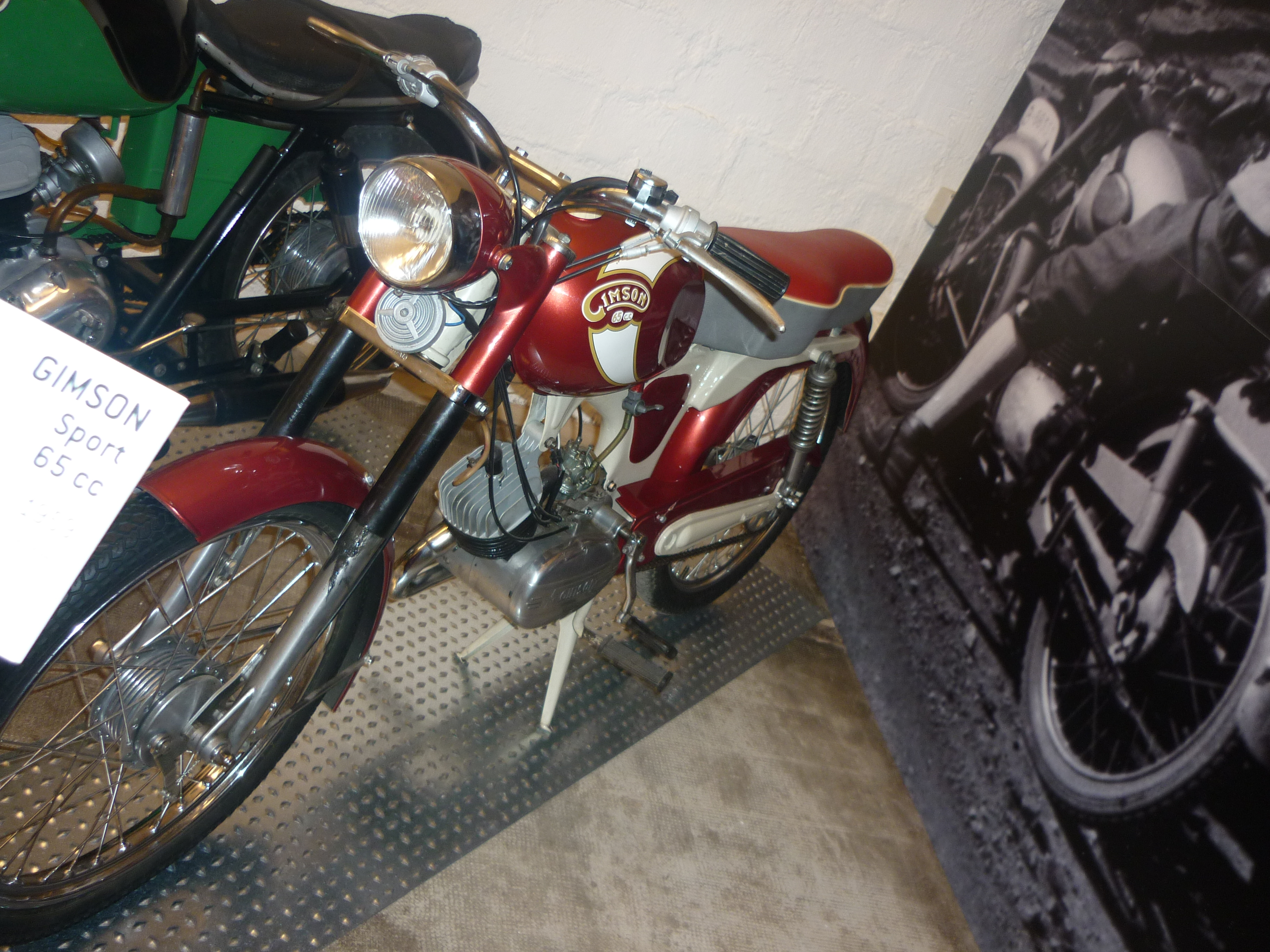
1959 Gimson Sport 65cc

Pere Gimbernat i Quintana, the founder's grandson and Engineer, had advanced ideas at that time. One was to produce the first electric moped in Catalonia. The prototype was presented in the 1973 Barcelona show, it had a Bosch engine. The prototype never went into production. Pere Gimbernat i Quintana was responsible for naming the new models, among which we find the successful Canigó, Polaris and Skipper. Moreover, he managed the whole process of the well-known commercial catalogs for their products (famous for its photographic and documentary quality). They were printed at local printing plants in Figueres, looking for the best spot to take the pictures, always landscapes from Empordà (the catalog pictures for the model Canigó were taken at Sant Llorenç de la Muga and the ones for the brand's main catalog were taken at Empuriabrava).

=== Closure ===
When Pierre Gimbernat i Font, the founder's son, died prematurely, the company was going through a tough time, with an oversized staff and the inability to apply a Layoff plan, adding the effects of the 1973 oil crisis and the entrance of the Japanese multinationals to the Spanish market. With the crisis, the company became a Cooperative and stopped producing mopeds, focusing only on bicycles. Pere Gimbernat i Quintana was at an age where he could not take too much risk, and he didn't have the funds to buy his Uncles part of the business, the situation became untenable, all ending in the closure of the factory in Figueres. The manufacturing right of the mopeds was acquired by the company placed in Murcia 'Motos del Sureste (Motomur)', which they marketed under the Beneti brand, although later it returned to the Gimson brand.

== Motorcycles ==
=== Beginning with the Gamo engine ===
From 1955, Gimson returned to the motorcycle business, starting by mounting Cucciolo and Villiers engines. Later, they produced their own model with a Gamo engine -manufactured in Barcelona between 1950 and 1955- consisting of 49 cc (moped) and 65 cc (velomotor), very advanced for that time, with a two-speed change, secondary transmission by single chain and rear brake on a singletube chassis in which protruded the bubble type Fuel Tank. The two versions of this model were named respectively 49 and 65.

Subsequently, the model Sport was launched, coexisting with the previous (known since Turismo), with the same engine and cylinder capacity. The Sport model was the first which had a T-shape stamped plate chassis that would become characteristic of the brand, with a seat upholstery in two colors and a rounded fuel tank, as well as a painted exhaust pipe, unlike the general trend which was chromed. This model was distributed in color schemes of blue and gray or red and cream. Both models had a luxury option called Lujo, externally differentiated because the swingarm was tubular instead of stamped sheet metal, also had a different crankcase logo from the usual.

=== Consolidation with the Flandria engine ===
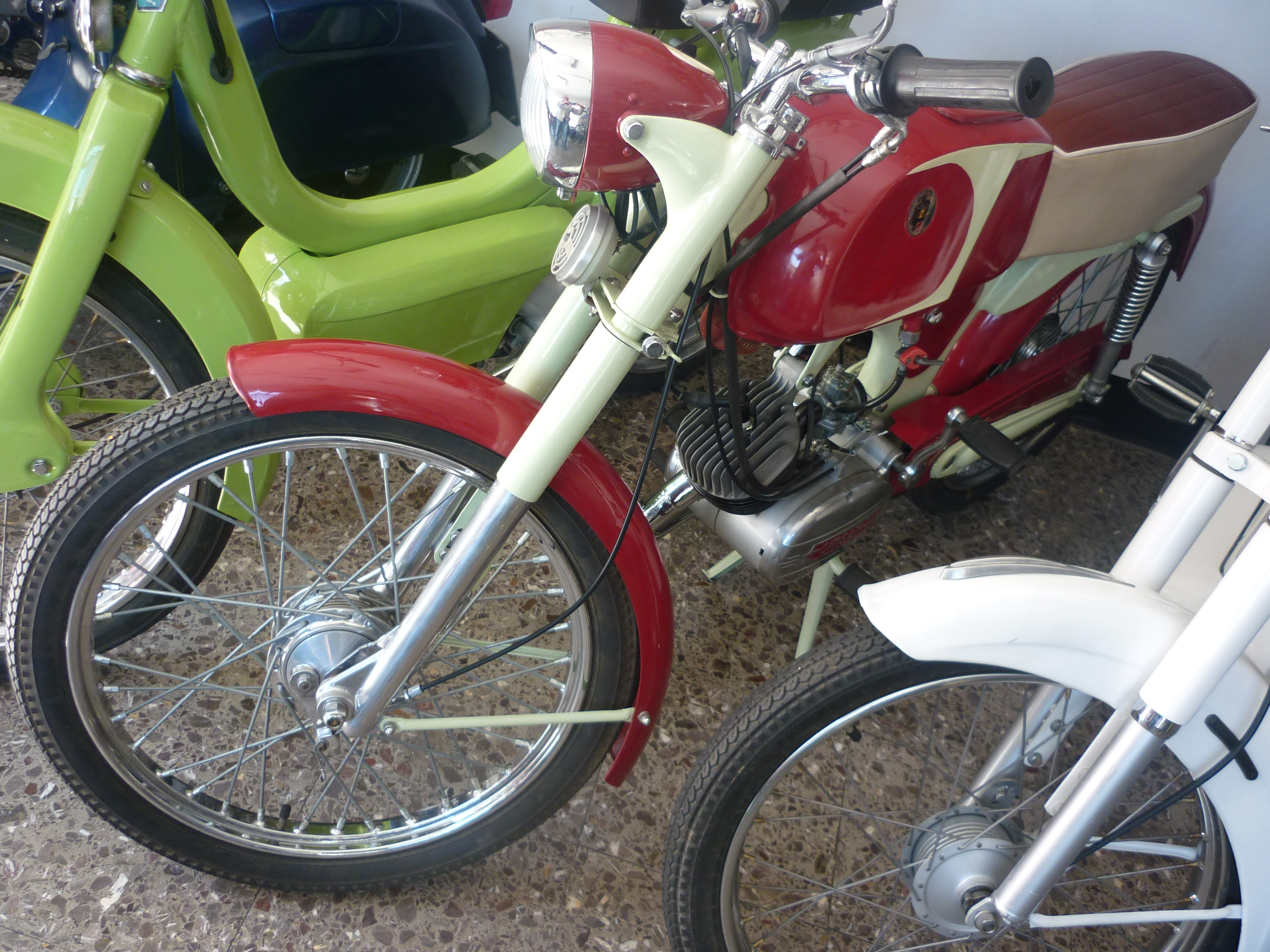
1967 Gimson Polaris 49cc

With the withdrawal of the Parés brothers (manufacturers of the Gamo engine), the company needed another engine to mount, opting for the Belgian Flandria, which they produced under license. The first model that mounted this engine was the Gimson Polaris. Keeping its predecessor Sport scheme, mounting the same stamped sheet metal frame (adapting it to fit the new Flandria engine), but with a more rectilinear shaped fuel tank. This was probably the most successful model of the brand, running to three series, all of them in blue and grey or red and cream color schemes.

The same way appears the first offroad Gimson's model, named Canigó after the Canigou mountain. The first production series, this model is almost the same as Polaris, except for the back part, and was followed by a second version, still with the same frame, but with a more appropriately adapted shape for its offroad purpose.

Referring to the automatic models, appears the Velomatic moped, with a similar aesthetic to Turismo but with straighter lines and in accordance with its time, with bubble-shaped tank mounted on a frame similar to a bicycle. That moped mounted a Flandria engine, with direct admission to the crankcase and a single gear, but without variator.

=== Expansion ===
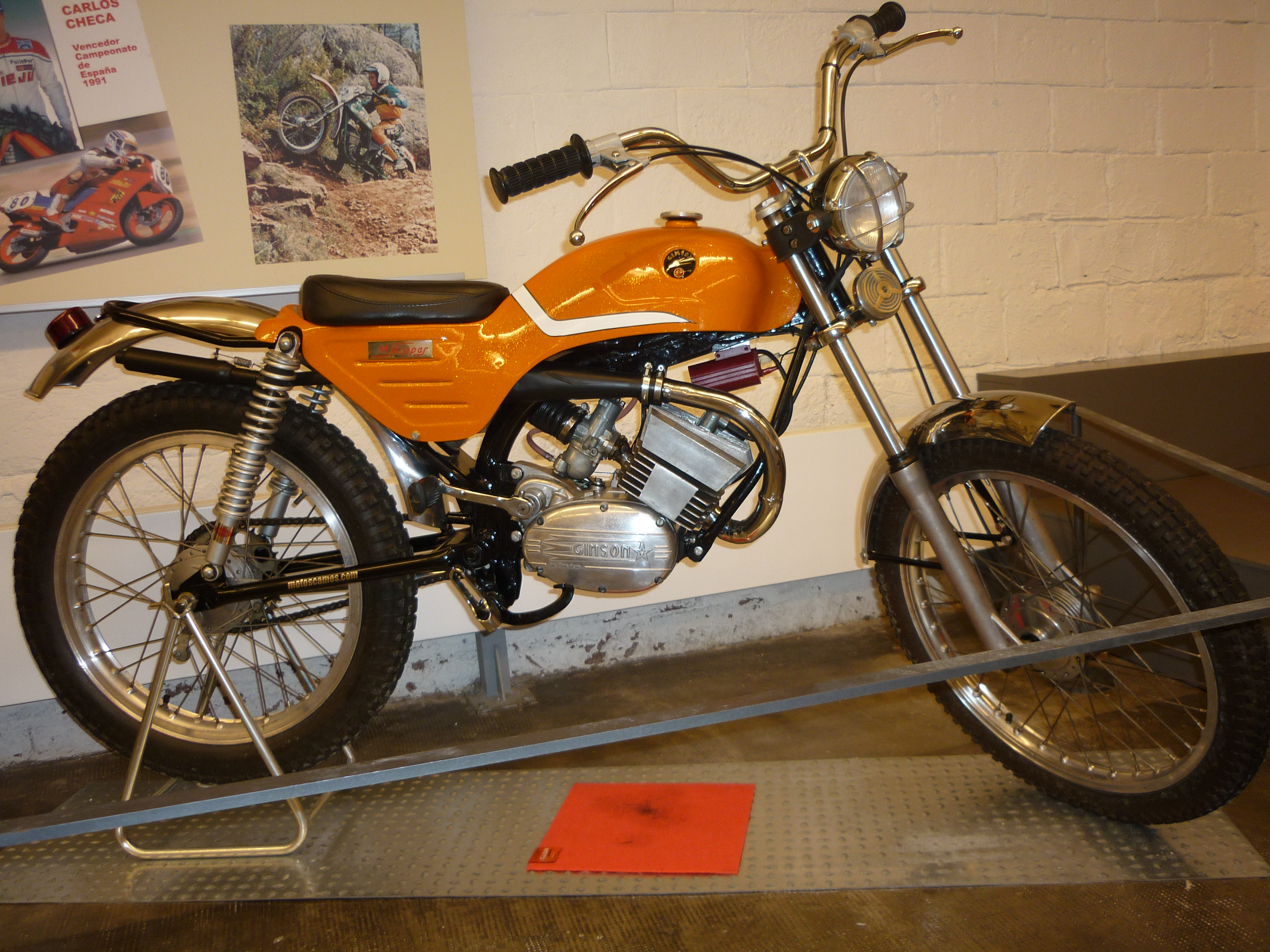
1976 Gimson Skipper Trial 50cc

From that moment Gimson switched their frames to a tubular fishbone scheme, launching different models that expanded their range. As road models the Polaris Super, renamed as Meteor, and its Sport variant (the same motorcycle, but with accessories such as indicator lights which were not required at this time). This motorcycle is easy to recognise, because it has the fuel tank in two different colors, the orange top, and a triangular rubber lining that protects the area bordering with legs. On the other hand, alsos arises the Elite (which had a new logo and was characterized by its red color) and had two different decorations, with Gimson's logo before with straight lines on a white background, after with curved lines on a black background. Regarding the country motorcycles, arises the Skipper Trial, one of the first motorcycles designed only for trials in Spain, and its successors Jumper Cross (Motocross type) and Enduro E87 (Enduro type).

=== Murcian stage ===
Back in the '70s, with motorcycle's manufacturing rights sold to the Murcian company Motomur, they produced the Nevada and Elite 2 models, and the Sport variant which mounted cast rims instead of spoked, as well as other aesthetic improvements. However the scheme and the engine of the Gimson motorcycles remained the same as the original from Figueres, changes being mostly aesthetic, such as the appearance of a false double cradle in the tubular frame.

Concerning the offroad motorcycles, the LSA model was launched, later on the LSA RA (being "RA" an acronym for "Refrigerada per Aigua" which means water-cooled). While the frame and engine are the same, for the first time adopted a cylinder with liquid cooling, above disc brake and modifies the swingarm to adopt a rear monoshock system, as well as a more elaborated design of the model. Unfortunately, Gimson could not go ahead and this model has become one of the most difficult to find these days.

They produced a sporty model called M1 with a design that resembles a racing motorcycle. In the automatic section we found the only one keeping the Beneti trading name, the Beneti Stylo model, which had a Peugeot engine.

=== Models ===
Gimson motorcycle models
	Bicycle frame	Stamped sheet metal	Tubular frame	Double cradle frame	Automatic
Gamo engine	Turismo 49cc; Turismo 65cc; Turismo Lujo 49cc; Turismo Lujo 65cc	Sport 49cc; Sport 65cc			Velomatic; Velomatic Super Lujo; Two Seater Velomatic.; Velomatic V1 1st Series; Velomatic V1 2nd Series
Flandria engine		Canigó; TT Canigó; Polaris 1st Series; Flash; Polaris 2nd Series; Polaris 3rd Series	Skipper Trial 1st series; Skipper Trial 2nd series; Jumper Cross; Meteor; Elite Serie 1; Elite Serie 2		Variomatic
Murcian stage				Elite 2; Elite Sport; Nevada; Enduro E87; LSA; LSA RA; M1	Maxi; Beneti Stilo
