= Richard Bourne (priest) =

Anglican priest

Richard Bourne was an Anglican priest in Ireland during the late 18th and early 19th centuries.

Bourne was educated at Trinity College, Dublin. He was appointed Prebendary of Monmohenock at St Patrick's Cathedral, Dublin from 1707. He was Dean of Tuam from 1810 to 1813; and Chancellor of Armagh from 1813 until his death in 1817.
