= George Nixon (priest) =

Irish Anglican priest

George Robinson Nixon was Archdeacon of Tuam from 1939 until 1950.

Nixon was educated at Trinity College, Dublin and ordained in 1909. After curacies in Tuam, Dublin and Kilnamanagh he became Rector of Killasnet in 1914, after which he was the Incumbent at Turlough. He was the Diocese of Tuam's Inspector of Schools from 1917 until 1942; Rural Dean of Tuam from 1922 to 1944;and Domestic Chaplain to the Bishop of Tuam from 1923 to 1944. During this period these would have been John Orr, John Mason Harden, William Hardy Holmes (and John Winthrop Crozier).
