= Gervase of Chichester =

12th-century English writer and clergyman

Gervase of Chichester (died c. 1197) was an English clergyman and writer active in the late 12th century.

== Career ==
Gervase was a pupil or student of Hilary of Chichester, the bishop of Chichester. Around 1158 Gervase appears as a clerk of King Henry II of England, while also simultaneously serving Henry's chancellor, Thomas Becket. The king and Becket arranged for Gervase's appointment to two churches – Basing and Shelbourne in Berkshire – by Robert de Torigni, the abbot of Mont St Michel. Gervase followed Becket to Canterbury when Becket became archbishop of Canterbury. Herbert of Bosham names Gervase as one of the 17 eruditi, or "scholars" that Becket had at Canterbury. Herbert gave this list as a separate grouping from the secular law experts in Becket's household, explaining that the eruditi were theologians and experts in "courts spiritual". He is usually given the title of "master", but the details of why he was called that are unknown. Gervase did not follow Becket when the archbishop went into exile in 1164 over the Becket controversy but instead returned to Chichester and the service of Hilary. He was recorded as a canon of the Chichester cathedral chapter in a document dated between 1174 and 1180, with his last occurrence in a document being between 1187 and 1192. He may be identified with the Gervase listed in a document that can be dated between 1165 and 1169. His death date is not known, but his successor at Shelbourne was in office on 13 August 1197.

== Writings ==
Gervase was active as a writer in the late 12th century. Gervase's surviving works are Editio super Malachiam de ordinis sacerdotalis instructione, which survives in two manuscripts, and a collection of homilies, which survives in one manuscript that is mostly complete. The Editio super Malachiam is a commentary on the biblical prophecies contained in the Book of Malachi attributed to Malachi. His homilies are sermons that he delivered on the second and third anniversaries of the martyrdom of Becket. These sermons were delivered at Chichester and compared Becket to two biblical figures – Phineas and Abel. John Leland saw a commentary on the biblical Book of Psalms at Walsingham Priory and attributed it to a Gervase, but it is not clear which of several possible Gervases was meant. Richard Sharpe considers it doubtful that the commentary Leland saw was authored by Gervase of Chichester. The two further works follow the homilies in the one extant manuscript – one on Ezekiel and one on the birth of John the Baptist, may have been written by Gervase, but this is not certain.
