= James Mobberley =

American composer, music teacher and guitarist

James C. Mobberley (born June 10, 1954, in Des Moines, Iowa) is an American composer, music teacher and guitarist.

== Biography ==
James Mobberley is an American composer of contemporary concert music, and is Curators' Distinguished Professor of Music Emeritus at the University of Missouri-Kansas City Conservatory, home to one of the largest and best known music composition programs in the U.S. A Rome Prize winner, Guggenheim Fellow and American Academy of Arts and Letters Award recipient, he writes music that spans many media, from orchestra and electro-acoustic music to music for dance, film, and video. His works have received over 1400 performances worldwide.

Commissions: Fromm Foundation at Harvard University, Koussevitzky Foundation/Library of Congress, Barlow Endowment, Meet the Composer, Chamber Music America, National Endowment for the Arts, and numerous ensembles and individual performers.

Selected as a 2009 Fellow of the Civitella Ranieri Center, he has also been a Resident Composer with the Kansas City Symphony (1992-1999), and a Visiting Composer with both the Taiwan National Symphony (1999) and the Fort Smith Symphony (2000).

Awards: American Academy of Arts and Letters, American Academy in Rome Fellow in Composition, John Simon Guggenheim Memorial Foundation Fellowship, and awards from League-ISCM, the Van Cliburn Foundation, the Shanghai Spring Festival, and numerous other organizations.

He has served on professional panels and nominating committees for organizations that include the American Academy in Rome, the Fromm Foundation, the Barlow Endowment, the National Endowment for the Arts, the Civitella Ranieri Center, the Fulbright Fellowships, New Music USA, the MacDowell Colony, the MidAtlantic Arts Foundation, the Bush Foundation, the McKnight Foundation, I-Park, the Fisher Competition and the Missouri Arts Council.

Two dozen recordings feature his music, including the Black Canyon, Bridge, Capstone, Centaur, Everglade, and Troppa Note labels, as well as an all-Mobberley recording on the Albany label recorded by the Czech National Symphony. Most of his music can be heard on https://www.soundcloud.com/jim-mobberley.

His music is primarily self-distributed, with additional publications by Roger Dean, and Edipan (Rome). Mobberley maintains a web site at http://www.jamesmobberleymusic.com.

== Compositions ==
=== Works for orchestra ===
- 2009 Grand Jetè (full orchestra) [13']
- 2000 Concerto No. 2 for Piano and Chamber Orchestra [19']
- 1996 Arena (Ballet for Orchestra) [22']
- 2012 Arena (Concert Version for Orchestra) [19']
- 1996 Concerto For Marimba (8 hands) and Orchestra [22']
- 1994 Concerto for Piano and Orchestra [23']
- 1992 Deja Voyages (full orchestra) [16']
- 1981 Synthesis (full orchestra) [13']
- 1979 Aquaria (full orchestra) [8']

=== Works for string orchestra ===
- 2009 Launch Pad (high school string orchestra) [7']
- 2006 Time Trial (high school string orchestra)[7']
- 2003 Harmonic Dreams (middle school string orchestra) [6']
- 1995 Fantasia Parachicos (8-hand marimba w/string orchestra) [7']

=== Works for band ===
- 2013 A Crowd of Stars (wind ensemble and SATB Chorus) [17']
- 2012 Fantasy in Earth Tones (Wind Ensemble and fixed media) [7']
- 2012 EllenSong (wind ensemble and horn soloist) [11']
- 2010 Ascension (2010 version—wind ensemble and fixed media) [8']
- 2009 Night Waves (18-piece jazz band) [7']
- 2008 Words of Love (soprano and wind ensemble) [9']
- 2000 Fanfare: Many Voices, One Future (wind ensemble) [2']
- 1998 Edges (wind ensemble) [21']
- 1998 Concerto For Marimba (8 hands) and Wind Ensemble [22']
- 1995 The Billion Man Fanfare (high school symphonic band) [4']
- 1991 The Ceremony of Innocence (SATB chorus and wind ens.) [12']
- 1988 Ascension (wind ensemble and electronic tape) [8']

=== Musical theater ===
- 2000 Incidental Music and Songs for ''Iceman: A New Play for the Millennium'' – text: [Nicholas Kryah]

=== Choral music ===
- 2013 A Crowd of Stars (wind ensemble and SATB Chorus)[17']
- 2002 At Play in the Fields of the Mind for SATB Chorus [18']
- 2001-02 Haiku of Haiku for SATB Chorus [15']
- 1999 4 French Songs (Canteloube, arr. for Chanticleer) [10']
- 1996 Poem to Ease Birth (SATB Chorus) [4']
- 1991 The Ceremony of Innocence (SATB chorus and wind ens.) [12']
- 1989 Lullaby (SATB chorus with piano) [4']

=== Solo and chamber music ===
- 2015 Janus, Reflecting (flute, clarinet & piano) [8']
- 2015 Triathlon (saxophone solo) [10']
- 2014 Respiri (flute solo) [7']
- 2013 Subject to Change Without Notice (viola solo) [7']
- 2011 Capricious Invariance (piano solo) [14']
- 2007 Phenomena (piano solo; some movements with CD) [21']
- 2007 Phenomenon (piano solo) [14']
- 2004/rev. 2013 FUSEBOX (vln, clar, elec gtr, kybd, mallet, drums) [17']
- 2003 Vox Inhumana for soprano, 7 instruments and electronics [26']
- 2002 Balancing Act for erhu (Chinese fiddle) or violin, and ‘cello [5']
- 2001 Souvenirs for Chinese flute, erhu, pipa, zheng, and perc [26']
- 2001 Unexpected Voices (6-10 players/voices) [8']
- 2000 Voices: In Memoriam (version for solo piano without electronics) [8']
- 2000 Dim Sum (Chinese flute, erhu, zheng, percussion) [6']
- 2000 North Coast Cool (percussion quartet) [5']
- 2000 Give ‘em Hell! (piano solo) [9']
- 2000 Shebam (fl, bass cl, sax, vc, perc, pno) [9']
- 1999 Two Studies in Perpetual Motion (fl, cl, vln, vc, pno) [11']
- 1999 A Hint of Mischief (fl, cl, alto sax, vln, vc, perc, pno) [8']
- 1999 Elegy for Littleton, Colorado (cl, vln, vc) [5']
- 1997 Trelugue, Peccatas, and Feuds (organ solo) [12']
- 1992 Toccatas and Interludes (fl/cl/vln/vc/pno/perc) [14']
- 1990 On Thin Ice (tuba/euphonium ensemble, 9 parts) [6']
- 1988 Songs of Native North America (sop/ten/8 instruments) [17']
- 1987 Cyclescape (solo guitar) [5']

=== Soloists with electronic playback ===
- 2015 The Unpurged Images of the Day (trb, piano, fixed media) [15']
- 2011 Once Again to the Light (alto saxophone and fixed media)[9']
- 2007 Phenomena (piano solo; some movements with CD) [21']
- 2006 Alter Ego (‘cello and CD) [13']
- 2007 Voices: In Memoriam (version for piano with electronics) [8']
- 1994-97 Icarus Wept (trumpet and tape or trumpet, organ, and tape) [18']
- 1994 TNT [Turetzky’n’tape] (contrabass and tape) [10']
- 1992 Into The Maelstrom (piano and tape) [6']
- 1991 Spontaneous Combustion (saxes and tape) [10']
- 1990 In Bocca al Lupo (violin and tape) [8']
- 1989 Soggiorno (violin and tape) [10']
- 1989 Critical Mass (organ and tape) [5']
- 1987 Caution to the Winds (piano and tape) [6']
- 1986 BEAMS! (trombone and tape) [8']
- 1985 Going With the Fire (flute and tape) [7']
- 1982 A Plurality of One (clarinet and tape) [15']

=== Electronic playback alone or with actor ===
- 1982 A Plurality of One (clarinet and tape) [15']
- 2010 Playing Fields (CD alone; installation) [50']
- 2005 Vox Metallica (CD alone) [8']
- 2000 Study for Vox Inhumana (CD alone) [4']
- 1988 Aspenglow (tape alone) [5']
- 1987 Dialogue (performer/actor and computer) [15']
- 1978 Earth Tones (tape alone) [8']

== Publications ==
- with Earl Henry: Musicianship: ear training, rhythmic reading, and sight singing, Volume 1, Prentice-Hall, 1986. 306 p., ISBN 978-0-136-08563-8

== Bibliography ==
- Wolfgang Suppan, Armin Suppan: Das Neue Lexikon des Blasmusikwesens, 4. Auflage, Freiburg-Tiengen, Blasmusikverlag Schulz GmbH, 1994, ISBN 3-923058-07-1
- David M. Cummings, Dennis K. McIntire: International who's who in music and musician's directory – (in the classical and light classical fields), Twelfth edition 1990/91, Cambridge, England: International Who's Who in Music, 1991. 1096 p., ISBN 0-948875-20-8
