= Lee Hartman =

American animator and writer

Leland "Lee" Hartman (February 27, 1930 – December 24, 2012) was an American animator and writer.

Hartman graduated from the Art Institute of Pittsburgh.

Hartman was employed as an animator for the Walt Disney Company from 1955 to 1960. His credits at Disney included animated pieces for The Mickey Mouse Club; the 1958 short film, Paul Bunyan, which was directed by Les Clark (a member of Disney's Nine Old Men); and the animated feature film, Sleeping Beauty, which was released in 1959.

Hartman worked for Warner Bros. Animation during the 1990s. His animation for Warner Bros. included Tiny Toon Adventures.

Hartman began writing, in addition to animation, during the 1960s. In 1997, he published a series of short horror stories called "The Darkendown Tales." He also ventured into acting, appearing as a reporter in the 1968 horror film, Night of the Living Dead and as the voice of the Reporter in Night of the Living Dead: Reanimated. He also created the original sketch of "Slimer" for the animated Ghostbusters series.

Hartman, who suffered from dementia for six years, had been hospitalized at Kane Regional Glen Hazel Center in Pittsburgh, Pennsylvania, since early 2012 due to his condition. He died in Pittsburgh on December 24, 2012, at the age of 82. He was a resident of Castle Shannon, Pennsylvania.

Most of Hartman's extensive art collection was donated to the ToonSeum in Pittsburgh, where it will be on display. A smaller portion of his collection was bequeathed to the Heinz History Center.
