= List of Mills College honorary degree recipients =

List of Mills College, Oakland, California, U.S.A., honorary degree recipients:

- 2011 – Janet L. Holmgren
- 2011 – May Ohmura Watanabe
- 2010 – Dolores Huerta
- 2010 – Nancy Pelosi
- 2010 – Betty Wo
- 2009 – Stephanie Mills (journalist)
- 2009 – Kavita Ramdas
- 2009 – Renel Brooks-Moon '81
- 2008 – Glenn Voyles
- 2008 – Rita Moreno
- 2007 – Shirley M. Tilghman
- 2007 – Roselyne Chroman Swig
- 2006 – Barbara Boxer
- 2005 – Vivian M. Stephenson
- 2005 – Ronald V. Dellums
- 2004 – Lorry I. Lokey
- 2004 – Pauline Oliveros
- 2003 – Lois De Domenico
- 2003 – Earl F. Cheit
- 2003 – Eleanor Holmes Norton
- 2002 – Thoraya Ahmed Obaid '66
- 2001 – Antonia Hernández
- 2001 – Suzanne Adams
- 2000 – Herma Hill Kay
- 2000 – Mary Catherine Bateson
- 2000 – Isabel Allende
- 1999 – Barbara Lee '73
- 1999 – Lenore Blum
- 1999 – Johnnetta Cole
- 1998 – Eleanor Hadley '38
- 1998 – Anita L. DeFrantz
- 1997 – Trisha Brown
- 1997 – Chang-Lin Tien
- 1997 – Evelyn Cisneros
- 1996 – Marian Wright Edelman
- 1995 – Tillie Olsen
- 1995 – Paula Gunn Allen
- 1994 – Alice Waters
- 1994 – Angela Glover Blackwell
- 1994 – Dennis A. Collins
- 1993 – Margaret Wentworth Owings
- 1993 – Eugene E. Trefethen, Jr.
- 1992 – Kathleen Brown
- 1992 – Jane Newhall '36
- 1992 – Wilma Mankiller
- 1992 – Virginia B. Smith
- 1991 – Beate Sirota Gordon '43
- 1990 – Carolyn Kizer
- 1989 – April Glaspie
- 1988 – Lou Harrison
- 1987 – Madeleine Milhaud
- 1986 – Rosalyn Yalow
- 1986 – Jennifer Losch Bartlett '63
- 1985 – Dianne Feinstein
- 1985 – Anna Jane Harrison
- 1984 – Sylvia F. Porter
- 1984 – Mary E. Lanigar '38
- 1982 – Ansel Adams
- 1982 – Dave Brubeck
- 1980 – Esther R. Landa '33, MA '37
- 1978 – James David Hart
- 1977 – Carla Anderson Hills
- 1976 – Constance Wong Ong (Jade Snow Wong) '42
- 1976 – Robert Joseph Wert
- 1975 – Maya Angelou
- 1975 – Imogen Cunningham
- 1974 – Mary Woods Bennett
- 1973 – Leslie Langnecker Luttgens
- 1973 – Laura Thompson '27
- 1973 – Eugene Edgar Trefethen, Jr.
- 1972 – Richard Wall Lyman
- 1972 – Mary Louise James O'Brien
- 1970 – William Parmer Fuller Brawner
- 1969 – Kenneth Sanborn Pitzer
- 1968 – Walter Abraham Haas
- 1968 – Edgar Fosburgh Kaiser
- 1967 – Kathryn Grove Shipp
- 1967 – Camille Mermod
- 1967 – Dixy Lee Ray
- 1967 – Darius Milhaud
- 1967 – Charles Easton Rothwell
- 1967 – John Ewart Wallace Sterling
- 1966 – Marian Anderson
- 1966 – Martha Graham
- 1965 – Bernhard Blume
- 1965 – Claire Giannini Hoffman
- 1965 – Josephine Miles
- 1965 – Maurine Brown Neuberger
- 1964 – Dorothy Bullitt
- 1964 – Constantinos Arostolou Doxiadis
- 1964 – Sir George Bailey Sansom
- 1964 – General Lauris Norstad
- 1963 – Kate Hevner Mueller
- 1963 – Virginia Foisie Rusk
- 1963 – Ei Komada
- 1963 – Phillips Talbot
- 1962 – Katherine Esau
- 1962 – Herbert Edwin Hall
- 1962 – George Frederick Reinhardt
- 1962 – Emma Moffat McLaughlin
- 1961 – Charlotte D'Evelyn
- 1961 – Margaret Habein
- 1961 – Edith R. Mirrielees
- 1961 – Luis Monguio
- 1960 – Edith Margaret Coulter
- 1960 – William Leonard Langer
- 1960 – Wendell Meredith Stanley
- 1959 – Cora Du Bois
- 1958 – Angela Diller
- 1958 – Georgia Elma Harkness
- 1958 – John Edwin Pomfret
- 1958 – Lynn Townsend White, Jr.
- 1957 – Margaret Chase Smith
- 1957 – Pearl Anderson Wanamaker
- 1956 – George Keith Funston
- 1955 – Helenor Campbell Wilder Foerster
- 1955 – Edwin Grabhorn
- 1955 – Agnes Ernst Meyer
- 1954 – Katherine Fleming Branson
- 1954 – Detlev Wulf Bronk
- 1954 – Warren Olney III
- 1953 – Flora Belle Ludington
- 1953 – Marjorie Hope Nicolson
- 1952 – Agnes George DeMille
- 1952 – Lillian Moller Gilbreth
- 1952 – Elinor Raas Heller
- 1952 – Ruth Marian Leach
- 1952 – Patricia Newcomb
- 1952 – Georgia O'Keeffe
- 1952 – Helen Crocker Russell
- 1952 – Esther Dayman Strong
- 1952 – Katherine Amelia Towle
- 1951 – Lotte Lehmann
- 1951 – Stephen Fielding Bayne, Jr.
- 1951 – William Fife Knowland
- 1950 – Cornelia Otis Skinner
- 1950 – Jessamyn West
- 1950 – Annette Abbott Adams
- 1950 – Rosalind Cassidy
- 1949 – Sarah Gibson Blanding
- 1949 – Earl Warren
- 1949 – Alice Tisdale Hobart
- 1949 – Dorothy McCullough Lee
- 1948 – Barbara Nachtrieb Armstrong
- 1948 – Dorothy Wright Liebes Morin
- 1948 – David Dean Rusk
- 1947 – Louis Booker Wright
- 1947 – Lily Ross Taylor
- 1947 – Gabriela Mistral
- 1946 – Vera Brittain
- 1946 – Edward Lambe Parsons
- 1946 – Mary Yost
- 1945 – Esther Caukin Brunauer
- 1945 – Virginia Crocheron Gildersleeve
- 1945 – Florence Horsbrugh
- 1945 – Bertha Lutz
- 1945 – Wu Yi-fang
- 1945 – Herbert Vere Evatt
- 1944 – German Arciniegas
- 1944 – Mabel Ray Gillis
- 1944 – Erico Veríssimo
- 1943 – Aurelia Henry Reinhardt
- 1943 – Robert Gordon Sproul
- 1943 – Marian Long Stebbins
- 1943 – Cornelia McKinney Stanwood
- 1942 – Leonora Wood Armsby
- 1942 – June Richardson Lucas
- 1942 – Emma Moffat McLaughlin
- 1942 – Hattie Hecht Sloss
- 1942 – Jade Wong Wu
- 1941 – Michi Kawai
- 1940 – Dexter Morriam Keezer
- 1940 – Frederic William Goudy
- 1940 – Pearl Chase
- 1939 – Eve Curie
- 1939 – Louise Arner Boyd
- 1939 – Althea Warren
- 1939 – Pierre Monteux
- 1939 – Dorothy Macardle
- 1938 – Mary Emma Woolley
- 1938 – Antonia Brico
- 1937 – Olga Bridgman
- 1937 – Yves Mario De Bellefon
- 1937 – Robert French Leavens
- 1937 – Anna Cox Brinton
- 1937 – Charles Reynolds Brown
- 1937 – William Edward Colby
- 1937 – Monroe Emanuel Deutsch
- 1937 – Katharine Folton
- 1937 – Susan Myra Kingsbury
- 1937 – Grace McCann Morley
- 1937 – Maude Royden
- 1937 – Roswell Gray Ham
- 1936 – Frederick Morgan Padelford
- 1936 – Jules Romains
- 1935 – Robert Andrews Killikan
- 1935 – Gertrude Atherton
- 1935 – Jessica Blanche Peixotto
- 1934 – Herman Phleger
- 1934 – Clelia Duel Mosher
- 1934 – Joseph R. Knowland
- 1934 – Albert Bender
- 1933 – Frederic Logan Parson
- 1933 – Lucy Ward Stebbins
- 1933 – Kathleen Parlow
- 1933 – Sara Bard Field
- 1932 – Dorothy Frances Wilson
- 1932 – Adelaide Brown
- 1932 – Emily Wilson
- 1931 – Robert Dollar
- 1931 – William Bennet Munro
- 1931 – Caroline Hazard
- 1931 – Sara Margery Fry
- 1929 – Charles Henry Rieber
- 1928 – Elizabeth Sprague Coolidge
- 1928 – Mary Hunter Austin
- 1927 – Mary Roberts Coolidge
- 1927 – Edwin Markham
- 1925 – Norman Frank Coleman
- 1925 – Clara Bradley Burdette
- 1925 – William Frederic Badè
- 1925 – William Andrews Clark, Jr.
- 1925 – Hettie Belle Ege
- 1925 – Albert Maurice Bender
- 1925 – David Prescott Barrows
- 1925 – Luella Clay Carson
- 1923 – Melville Best Anderson
- 1923 – Ina Donna Coolbrith
- 1923 – Lou Henry Hoover
- 1923 – Bernard Ralph Maybeck
- 1923 – John Henry Nash
- 1920 – Lucinda Wyman Prince
- 1903 – Jane Cordelia Tolman
- 1902 – Emma Wixom Palmer
- 1902 – Louis Lisser

== See also ==
- Mills College
