= PolicyLink =

US nonprofit organization

Coordinates: 37°48′14″N 122°16′5″W

PolicyLink is a national research and action institute dedicated to advancing economic and social equity. It focuses on policies affecting low-income communities and communities of color. It is a nonprofit organization based in Oakland, California.

== Background ==
Founded in 1999 by Angela Glover Blackwell and currently led by CEO Michael McAfee and President Ashleigh Gardere, PolicyLink aims to create sustainable communities by improving communities' access to quality jobs, affordable housing, good schools, transportation, and other prerequisites for healthy neighborhoods. Taking an approach that emphasizes localism, it pursues its mission by facilitating local organizations and grassroots organizers. The group shares its findings and analyses through its website, publications and blog; it also convenes national summits, and holds briefings with national and local policymakers. PolicyLink is staffed by attorneys and public policy experts in California, Washington, D.C., and New York.

As of 2021, PolicyLink holds a 4-star rating from Charity Navigator, based on an overall score of 95.45 out of 100.

PolicyLink has been criticized for opposing SB 50 and other pro-housing legislation and for opposing new housing production in their communications.

== Focus areas ==
=== Center for Health and Place ===
Angela Glover Blackwell, PolicyLink CEO, wrote in The Washington Post that "Congress must start thinking of health beyond health care .... We can no longer afford to have a 'sickness-driven' view of our health. We must create healthier communities—places with easy access to fresh food, parks, safe streets, and clean air—to help all Americans live healthier, longer lives and reduce health-care costs while we're at it." This focus on health policy has led to the group's collaborations with the Robert Wood Johnson Foundation's Center to Prevent Childhood Obesity and The Healthy Eating Active Living Convergence Partnership.

=== Bay Area Equity Atlas ===
PolicyLink manages the Bay Area Equity Atlas with the USC Equity Research Institute and the San Francisco Foundation. Research conducted by the Bay Area Equity Atlas is used to lobby the state legislature.

== Board of directors ==
As of 2021, PolicyLink's board of directors includes:

- Dolores Acevedo-Garcia, Brandeis University
- Richard Baron, McCormack Baron Salazar, Inc.
- Sheri Dunn Berry, Community Partners
- Geoffrey Canada, author and CEO of Harlem Children's Zone
- Radhika Fox, US Water Alliance
- Stewart Kwoh, Asian Americans Advancing Justice - Los Angeles
- Joan Walsh, The Nation
