= Bob Herbert =

American journalist

- Born: Robert Herbert; March 7, 1945 (age 81); New York City, U.S.
- Education: Empire State University (BS)
- Occupation: Journalist
- Notable credit(s): The New York Times; Sunday Edition

Robert Herbert (born March 7, 1945) is an American journalist and former op-ed columnist for The New York Times. His column was syndicated to other newspapers around the country. Herbert frequently writes on poverty, the Iraq War, racism and American political apathy towards racism. He is now a fellow at Demos and was elected to serve on the Common Cause National Governing Board in 2015.

== Early life and education ==
Herbert was born in Brooklyn, New York, and was raised primarily in Montclair, New Jersey, where his parents owned a number of upholstery shops. He was drafted during the buildup to the Vietnam War, but was ultimately sent to Korea. Always having had an interest in politics and writing, Herbert decided shortly after the war to go into journalism. Herbert received a Bachelor of Science in journalism from the State University of New York (Empire State College) in 1988.

== Career ==
Herbert's journalistic career began with The Star-Ledger in New Jersey in 1970. Herbert went on to work as a reporter and editor at the New York Daily News from 1976 until 1985, when he became a political columnist and editor, and began attracting attention for his editorial work. This led to a position on WCBS-TV in New York, as a founding panelist of Sunday Edition in 1990, as well as becoming host of Hotline, a weekly issues program on New York public television. He later served as a national correspondent on NBC from 1991 to 1993, with regular appearances on The Today Show and NBC Nightly News.

Herbert's journalistic awards include the Meyer Berger Award for coverage of New York City and the American Society of Newspaper Editors award for distinguished newspaper writing. He also chaired the Pulitzer Prize jury for spot news reporting in 1993. Herbert is author of Promises Betrayed: Waking Up From The American Dream, published by Henry Holt & Company in 2005.

Herbert left The New York Times on March 25, 2011, with his last column titled, "Losing Our Way." In June 2011, Herbert joined the national think-tank Demos as a Distinguished Senior Fellow. At the time his fellowship was announced, it was also revealed that he will write for the Demos blog PolicyShop as well as The American Prospect magazine, which merged with Demos in 2010.

In 2014 Herbert published his book Losing Our Way: An Intimate Portrait of a Troubled America.

Herbert directed the documentary film, Against All Odds: The Fight for a Black Middle Class (2017) which explores issues of the Black middle class, structural racism, and discrimination through historical footage and interviews with people such as Isabel Wilkerson, Maya Rockeymoore, Elijah Cummings, Alvin Poussaint, Angela Glover Blackwell, and Marc Morial.

=== In pop culture ===
Herbert is mentioned in the Seinfeld episode "The Big Salad" when character George Costanza's girlfriend Julie is discussing her favorite writers, and says "And Bob Herbert's great. He's the Daily News," to which Costanza compares Herbert's name pronunciation with Atlanta Falcons quarterback Bobby Hebert.
