= Curb =

Edge where a sidewalk meets a road

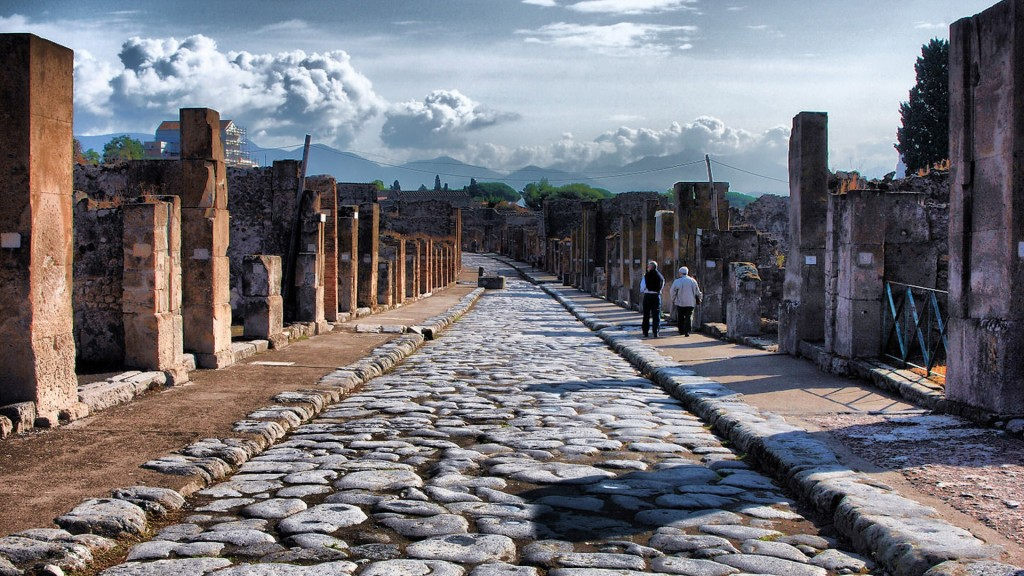
Stone curbs and raised sidewalks on both sides of a 2000-year-old paved road in Pompeii, Italy

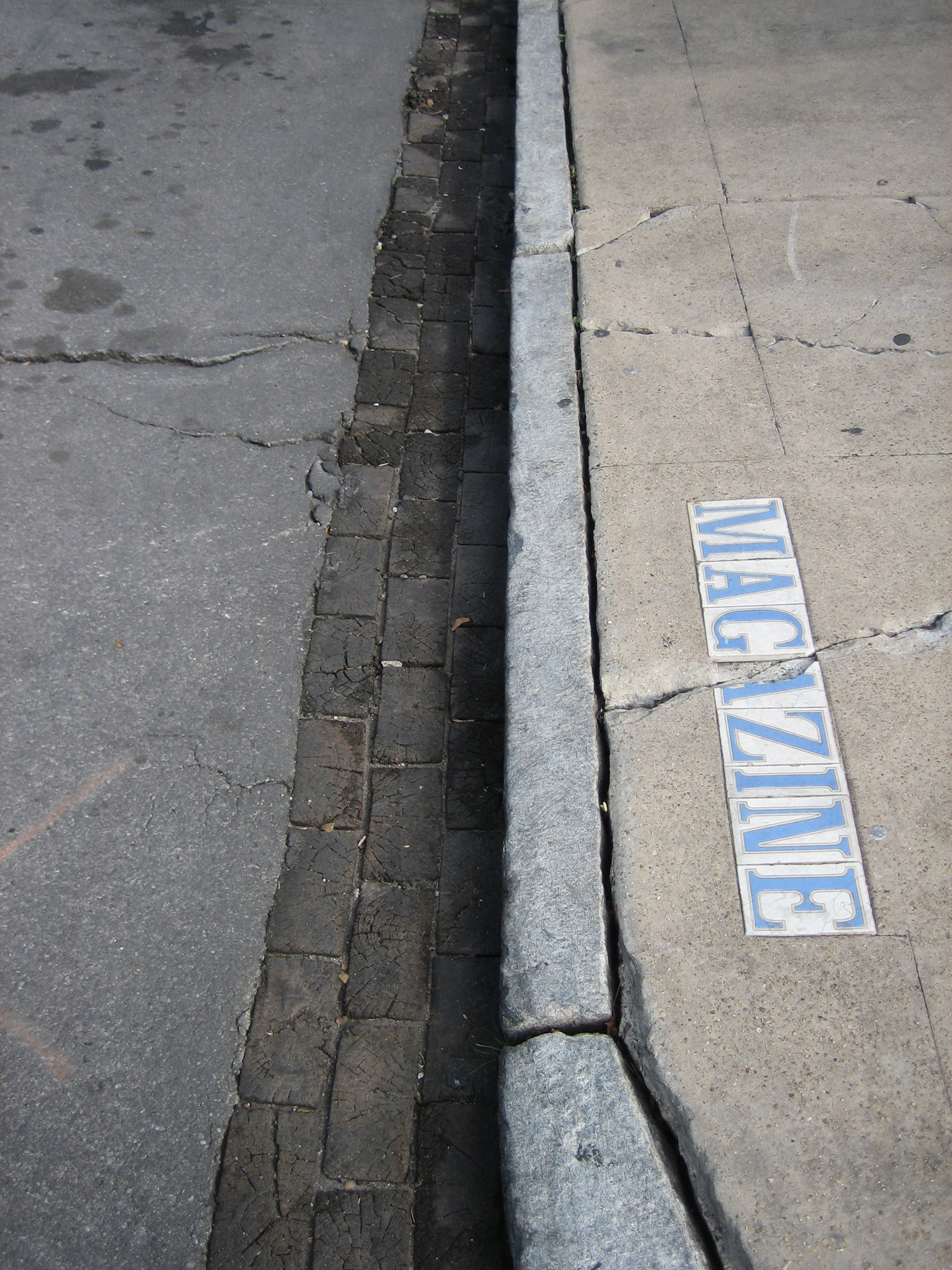
A curb with the street name on the sidewalk in New Orleans

A curb (American English) or kerb (British English) is the edge where a raised sidewalk or central median meets a street or other roadway.

== History ==
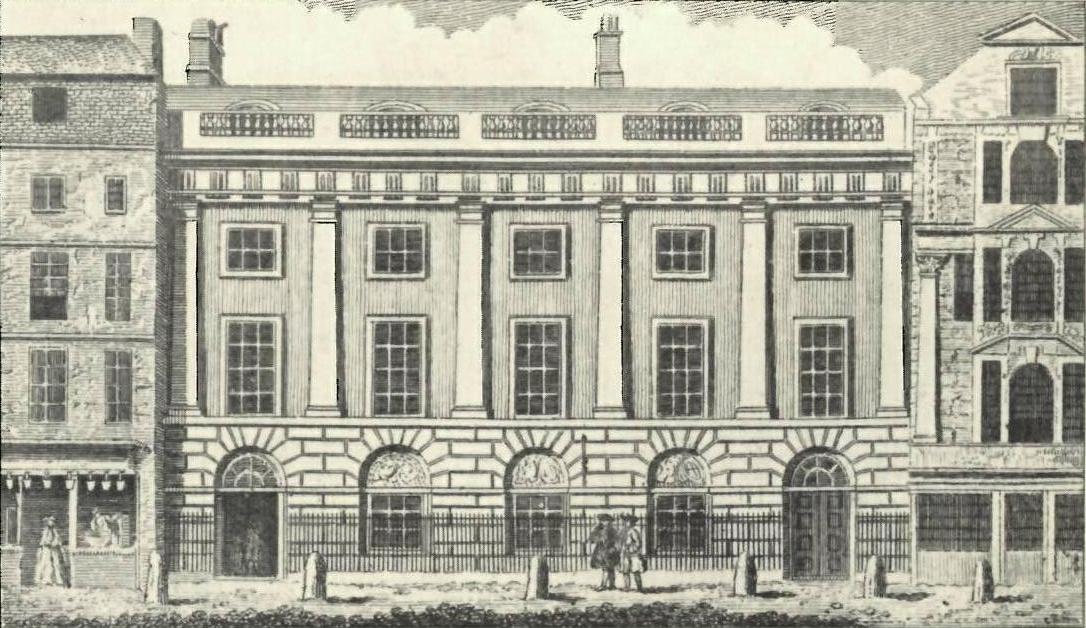
Pedestrian area separated from carriageway by six bollards in front of the East India House in London, 1766

Although curbs have been used throughout modern history, and indeed were present in ancient Pompeii, their widespread construction and use only began in the 18th century, as a part of the various movements towards city beautification that were attempted in the period.

A series of Paving Acts in the 18th century, especially the 1766 Paving and Lighting Act, authorized the City of London Corporation to create footways along the streets of London, pave them with Purbeck stone (the thoroughfare in the middle was generally cobblestone) and raise them above street level with curbs forming the separation. The corporation was also made responsible for the regular upkeep of the roads, including their cleaning and repair, for which they charged a tax from 1766.

Previously, small wooden bollards had been put up to demarcate the area of the street reserved for pedestrian use. By the late 18th century, this method of separating pedestrians from carriageways had largely been supplanted by the use of curbs. With the introduction of macadam roads in the early 19th-century, curbs became ubiquitous in the streets of London.

Curbs present an obstacle for accessibility to physically disabled persons in public spaces. In 1945, Jack Fisher of Kalamazoo, Michigan, celebrated the installation of one of the nation's first curb cuts to facilitate mobility in the center of the city. In the United States, activism and passage of federal legislation on accessibility requirements such as the Americans with Disabilities Act of 1990 (ADA) have facilitated travel for wheelchair users and other people.

== Function ==
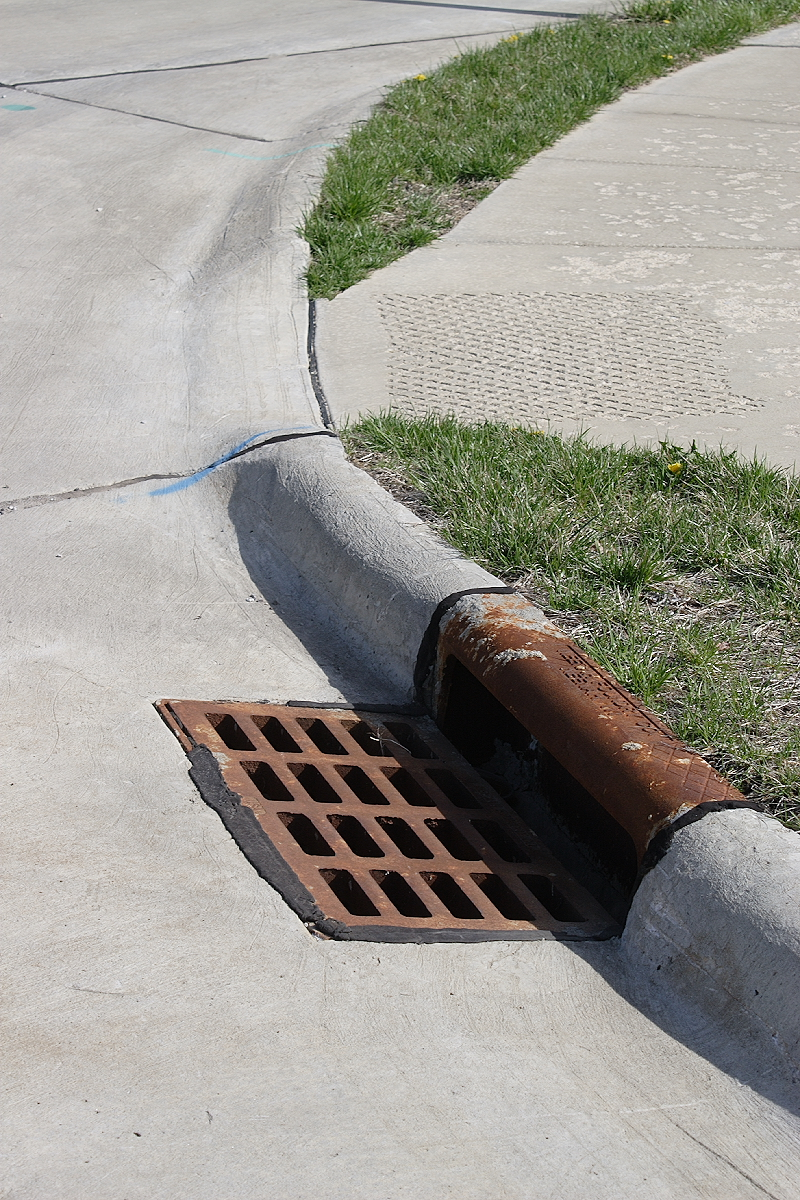
A modern curb, gutter, storm drain, and an accessibility ramp between roadway and pedestrian sidewalk

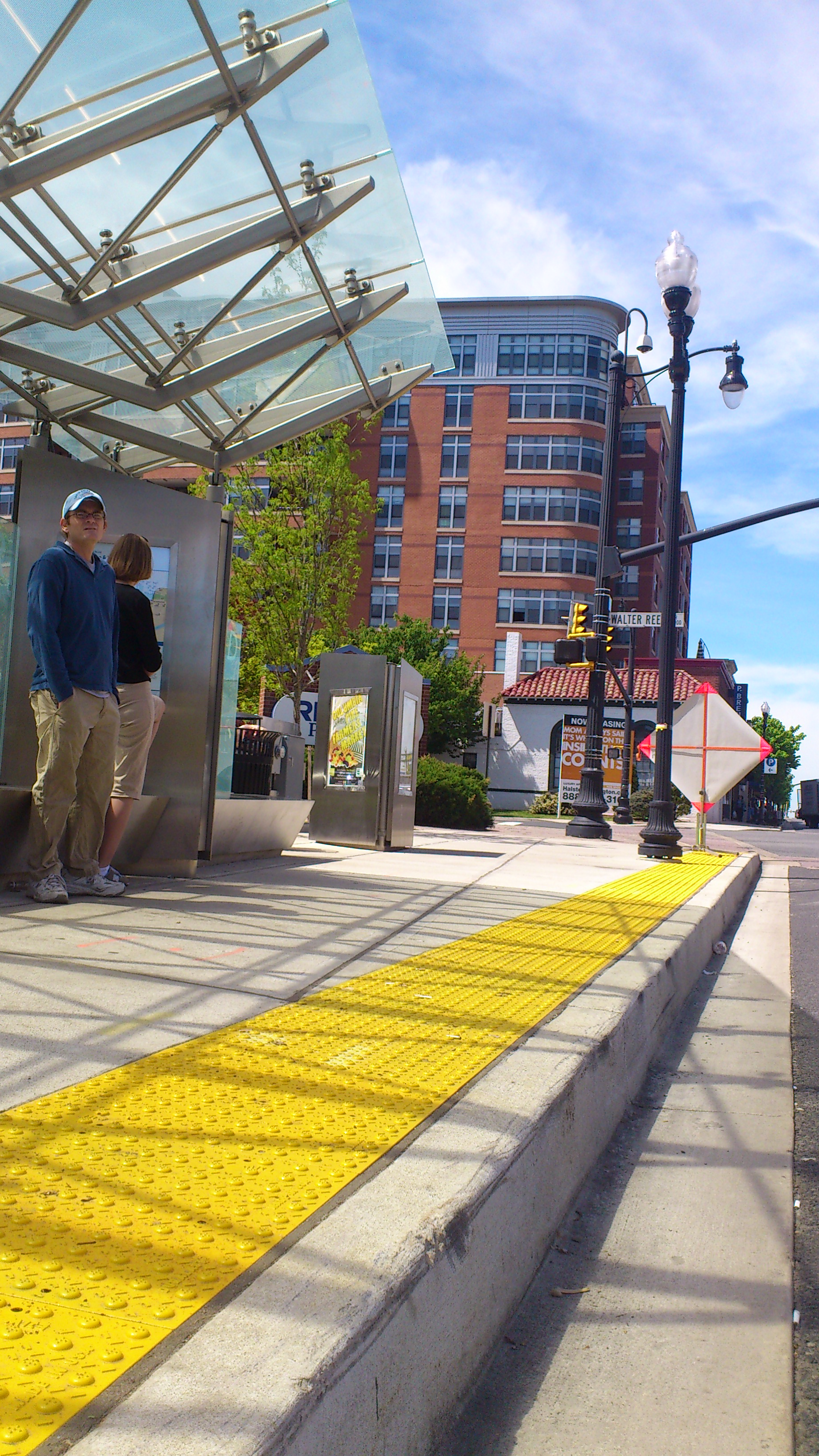
A high curb designed for boarding transit vehicles

Curbs may fulfill any or several of a number of functions. By delineating the edge of the pavement, they separate the road from the roadside and discourage drivers from parking or driving on sidewalks and lawns. They also provide structural support to the pavement edge. Curbs can be used to channel runoff water from rain or melted snow and ice into storm drains.

There is also an aesthetic aspect, in that curbs look formal and "finished".

Since curbs add to the cost of a road, they are generally limited to urban and suburban areas and are rarely found in rural areas except where certain drainage conditions (such as mountains or culverts) make them necessary. Curbs are not universally used, however, even in urban settings (see living street).

== Safety ==
In low-speed environments, curbs are effective at channeling motor vehicle traffic and can provide some redirective capacity for low-speed impacts.

On higher speed roads, the main function of curbs is to provide drainage, and they are mostly used in areas of a bridge approach or other locations with erosion risk.

A high-speed vehicle that hits a curb may actually turn towards the sidewalk, rather than be directed away from it. A vehicle that strikes a curb can also be tripped into a rollover crash or vaulted into the air. The vehicle could be vaulted over a traffic barrier into the object the barrier is intended to shield. This is a reason why they are rarely used on rural or high-speed roads. Where a curb is used with a traffic barrier, the barrier should either be close to or well behind the curb, to reduce the chances of a vehicle going over the barrier.

Depending on the area and the distance between the travel lane and the edge of the pavement, an edge line can be used to indicate the outside (shoulder) edge of the road. Retroreflective road marking material can also be applied to the curb itself to make it more conspicuous.

Curbs are also meant to inform pedestrians to stop or slow down as they prepare to cross roadways. For example, cultural context and behavioral norms of a society may affect safety in that people are more likely to cross on a red light while standing alone than waiting with others at the curb.

== Types of curb ==
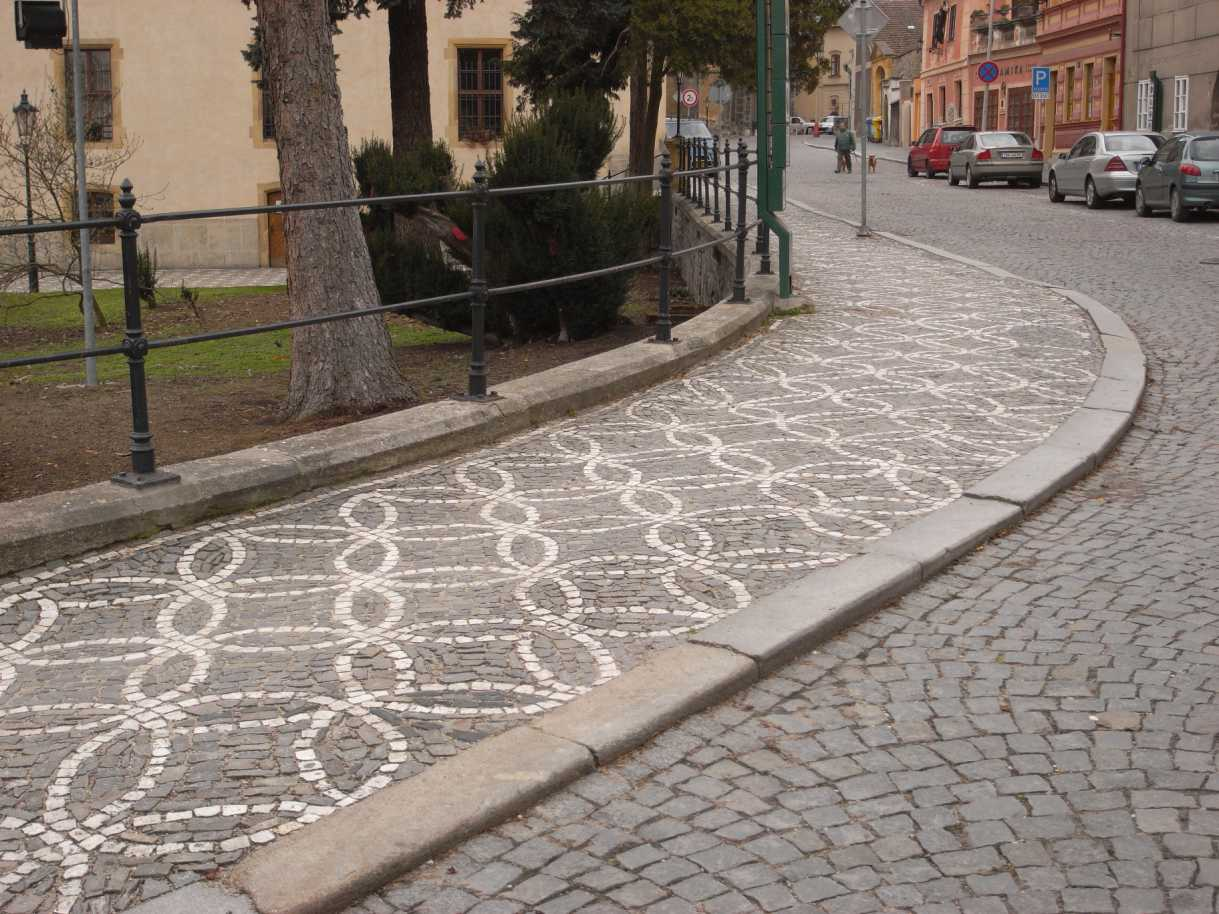
Old sidewalk with granite curb in Kutná Hora

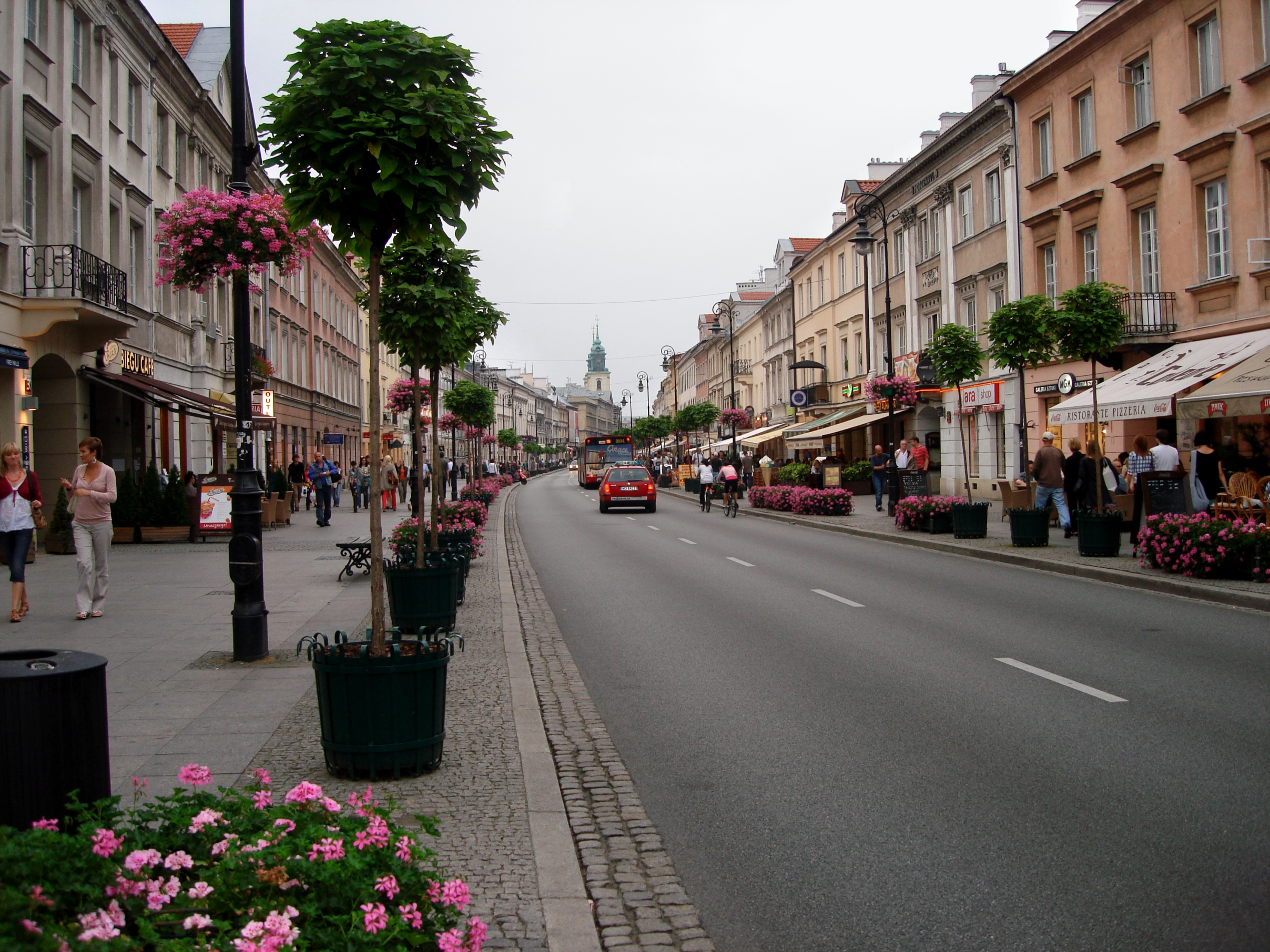
Modern use of stone curbs, cobblestone, and planters as bollards to separate vehicles from pedestrians in Warsaw

There are a number of types of curbs, categorized by shape, material, height, and whether the curb is combined with a gutter. Most curb is constructed separately from the pavement, and the gutter is formed at the joint between the roadway and the curb. The combined curb and gutter (also called "curb and channel") has a concrete curb and gutter cast together in one piece. "Integral curb" is curbing constructed integrally as a part of the concrete pavement.

=== Shape ===
Curbs often have a vertical or nearly-vertical face, also called "barrier", "non-mountable", or "insurmountable curb". A vertical-faced curb is used to discourage motor vehicle drivers from leaving the roadway. The square (90°-edge) or close-to-square type is still almost always used in towns and cities, as it is a straight step down and thus less likely to be tripped-over by pedestrians. By contrast, a slope-faced curb allows motor vehicles to cross it at low speed. Slope-faced curb is most often used on major suburban thoroughfares.

In certain locales, such as California, there is an effort to standardize the design to achieve efficiencies in construction and lower costs. Trends include using a 24-inch (610 mm) gutter that balances the increased initial price with lower maintenance costs.

At crosswalks and other pedestrian crossings, narrow dropped curb cuts are used to allow small wheeled vehicles such as wheelchairs, children's tricycles, prams, and strollers to cross. This makes it easier to traverse for some pedestrians, and especially for those in wheelchairs. Wider curb cuts are also used to allow motor vehicles to cross sidewalks at low speed, typically for driveways.

In Great Britain, "high containment kerbs" are used at locations with pedestrians, fuel station pumps, and other areas that need greater protection from vehicle traffic. These are 14 inches (36 cm) high - much higher than standard curb, with a sloped lower portion and a concave face. These are also known as "trief" curbs.

Rounded curbs are most often used at driveways, and continuously along suburban residential streets where there are many driveways and the sidewalk has a grassy setback from the street. This type of curbing starts out nearly flat like the road, curves up in a concave manner to a gentle slope, then curves back in a convex manner to nearly flat again, making it much easier to drive over, and is also known as a "rolled" or "mountable curb" in some localities. These types of curbs are preferred by builders because they are less expensive than installing straight curbs and gutters. They are easier to lay using concrete and require less forming as steel templates can be used with only front and back forms needed. Their use also eliminates the need for driveway cuts, curbs, and aprons, thus further reducing costs.

=== Material ===
Curbs are constructed of many materials, including asphalt, stone, or masonry blocks, but most often are made of Portland cement concrete. The type of material may depend on the type of paving material used for the road and the desired function or need. For example, a Portland concrete curb used with an asphalt concrete road surface provides a highly visible barrier at the edge of the road surface. Other types of curb material include stone slabs, cobblestone, and manufactured pavers.

A concrete curb may be constructed by setting forms by hand, filling them, letting them set up, and then removing the forms. When large quantities of curb are to be constructed, it is often more efficient to use a slip form casting machine. Curbs can also be precast at a central location and trucked to the construction site.

Asphalt curb is usually made with a paving machine. It can be cheaper if it is formed at the same time that a road is paved, but is less durable than a concrete curb.

Stone curb, often made from granite, is durable and resistant to de-icing salt. It is also chosen for aesthetic reasons. In areas where granite is available, it may be cheaper than concrete curb. One disadvantage of granite curb is that it can cut a tire sidewall if it is rough-faced.

Belgian block curbs are made by placing blocks over a concrete slip. Then, more concrete is wedged in between the blocks to hold them together. These blocks can be vertical or angled in order to create a mountable curb.

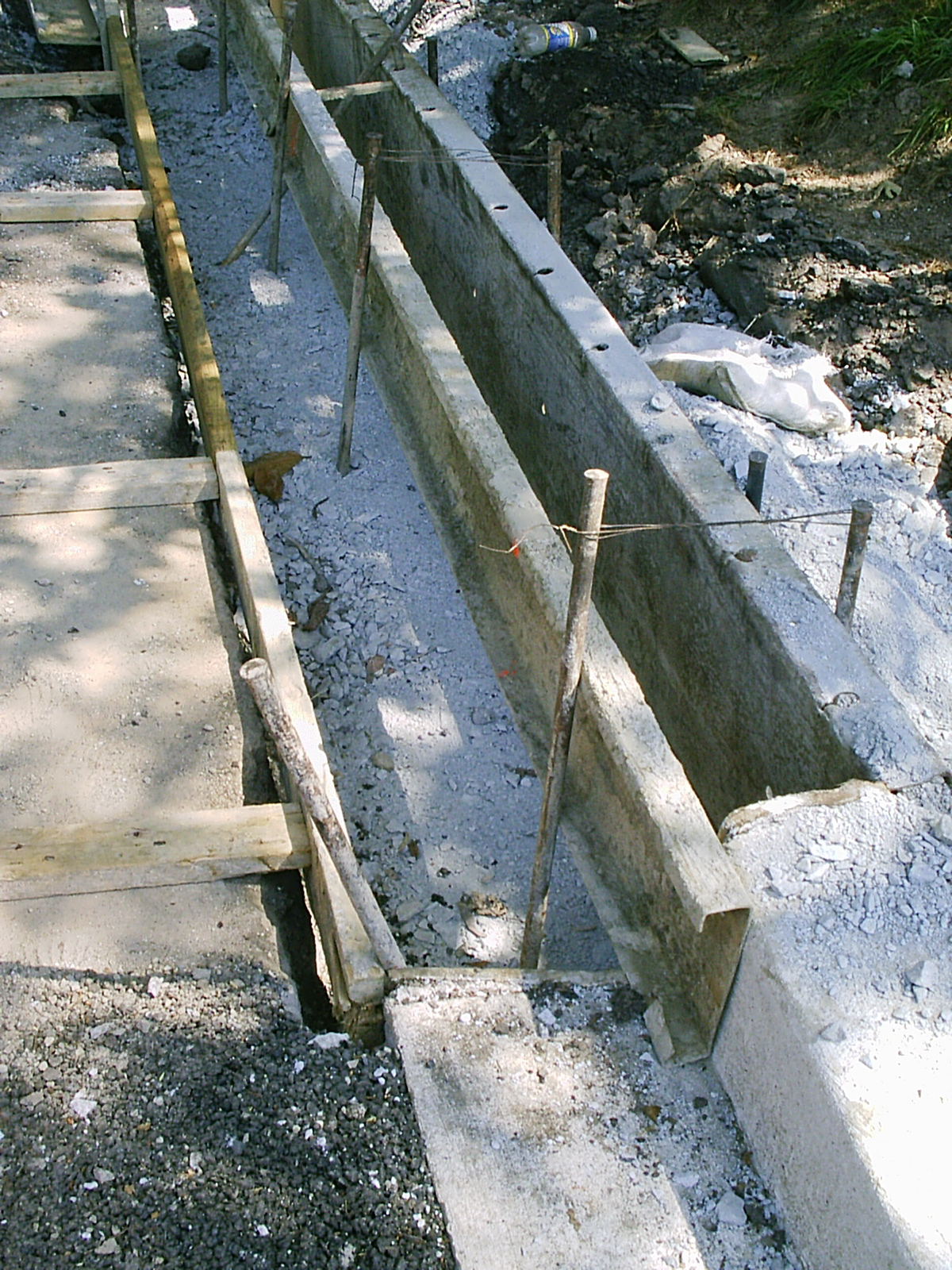
Metal forms before the concrete is poured and finished by hand

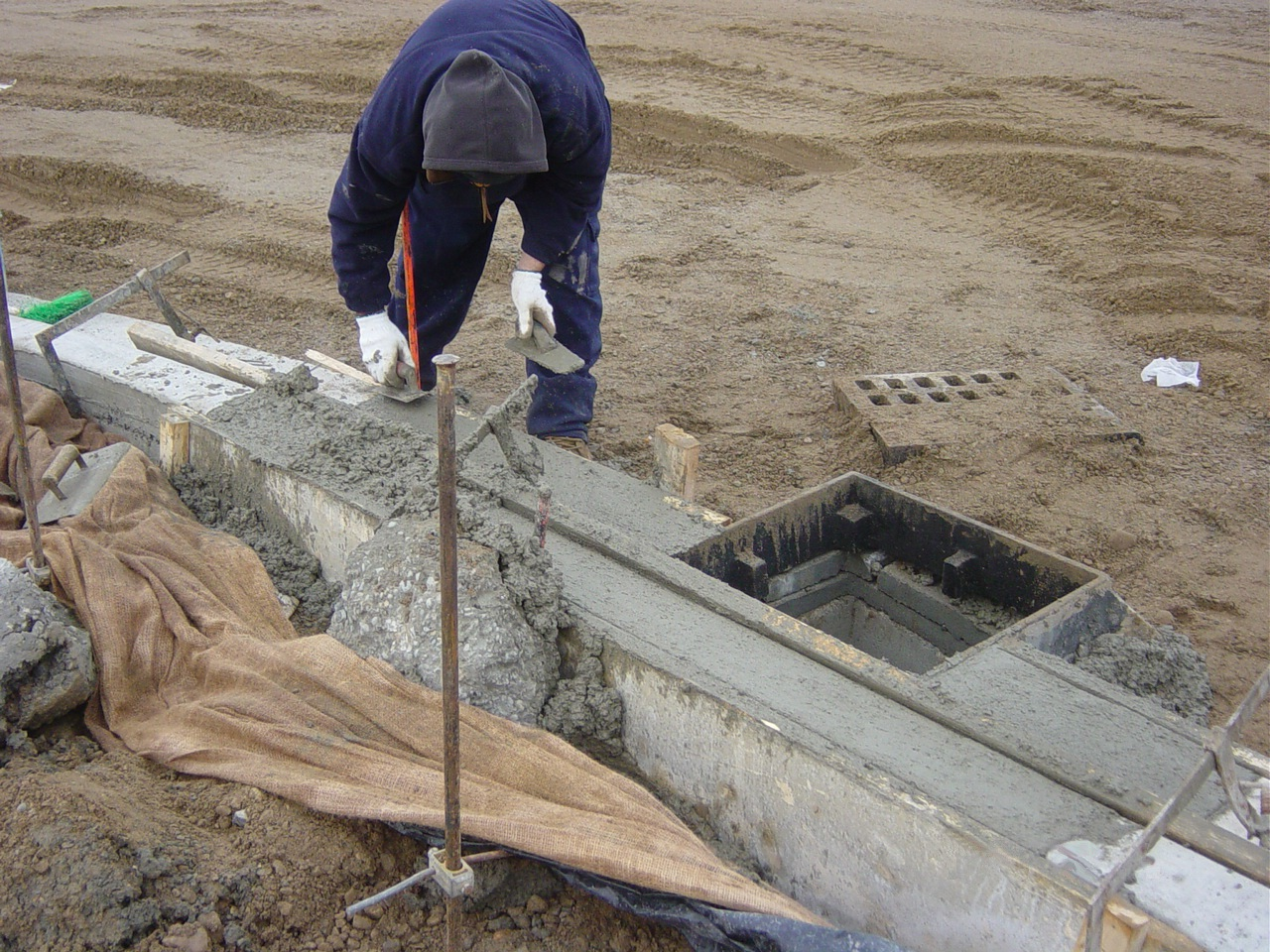
Hand forming at catch basins

=== Height ===
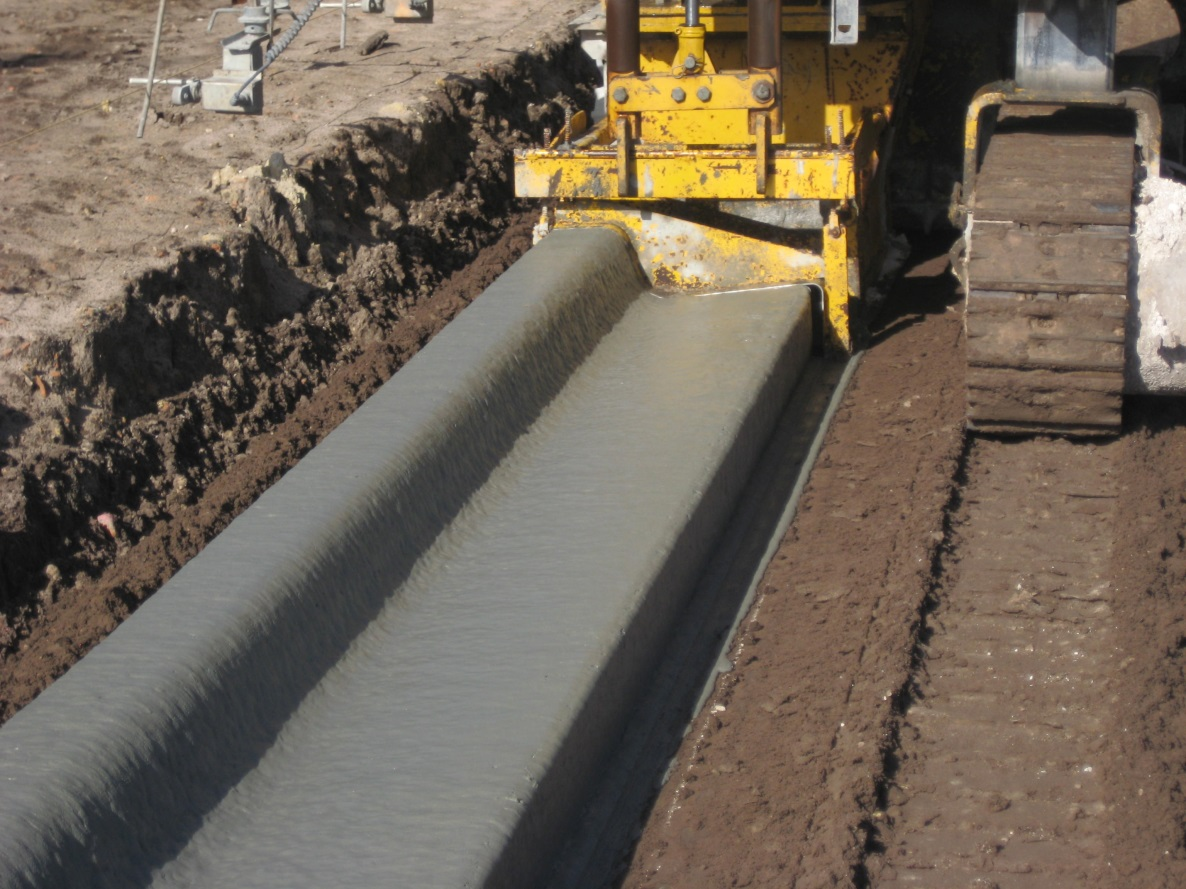
This machine slip casts a concrete curb with integral gutter

When designing a curbed roadway, engineers specify the "reveal" or "lip". The reveal is the height of the section that is visible (revealed) above the road surface. Typical reveals are in the 4 to 8 inches (100 to 200 mm) range. Curbs at handicapped curb cuts (or "kerb ramps", for example in Australia) should have no reveal. One of the recommendations has been using a 4/12 batter in to accommodate automobile design because steeper batters tend to interfere with body trim, hubcaps, and lower door edges while curb faces in excess of 6 in (152 mm) in height may prevent the full opening of car doors. Most curb extends down into the ground below the pavement surface, to improve their stability over time. The total height, including the buried portion, is often 16 in (406 mm).

=== Integral gutter ===
Curbs with integral gutters are used where better hydraulic flow performance is needed. However, this places a longitudinal joint (parallel to the direction of travel) near where bicyclists often ride. If the main roadway and gutter settle differently over time, the vertical edge that develops at the joint can cause a hazard for bicyclists.

=== Paint ===
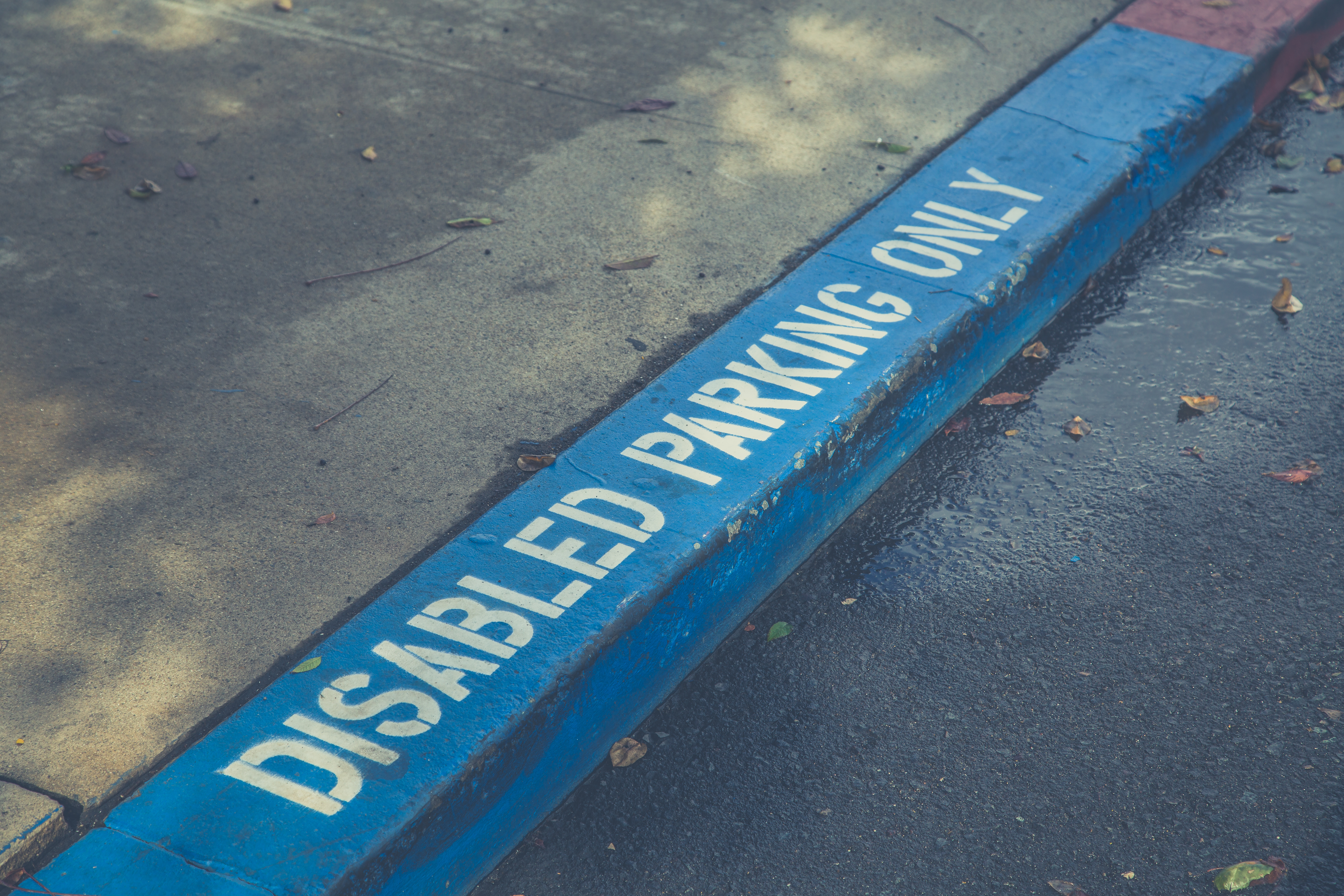
Blue curb marking

In some places curbs are painted to increase visibility or mark a special street side.

== Auto racing curbs ==
In auto racing, curbs are flat curbstones lining the corners or chicanes of racing tracks. They are often painted red and white, and are intended to prevent unauthorized short-cuts and keep the racers safely on the track. Although they are not considered part of the racing track, drivers sometimes "ride the curbs" in order to maintain momentum and gain a time advantage in cornering.

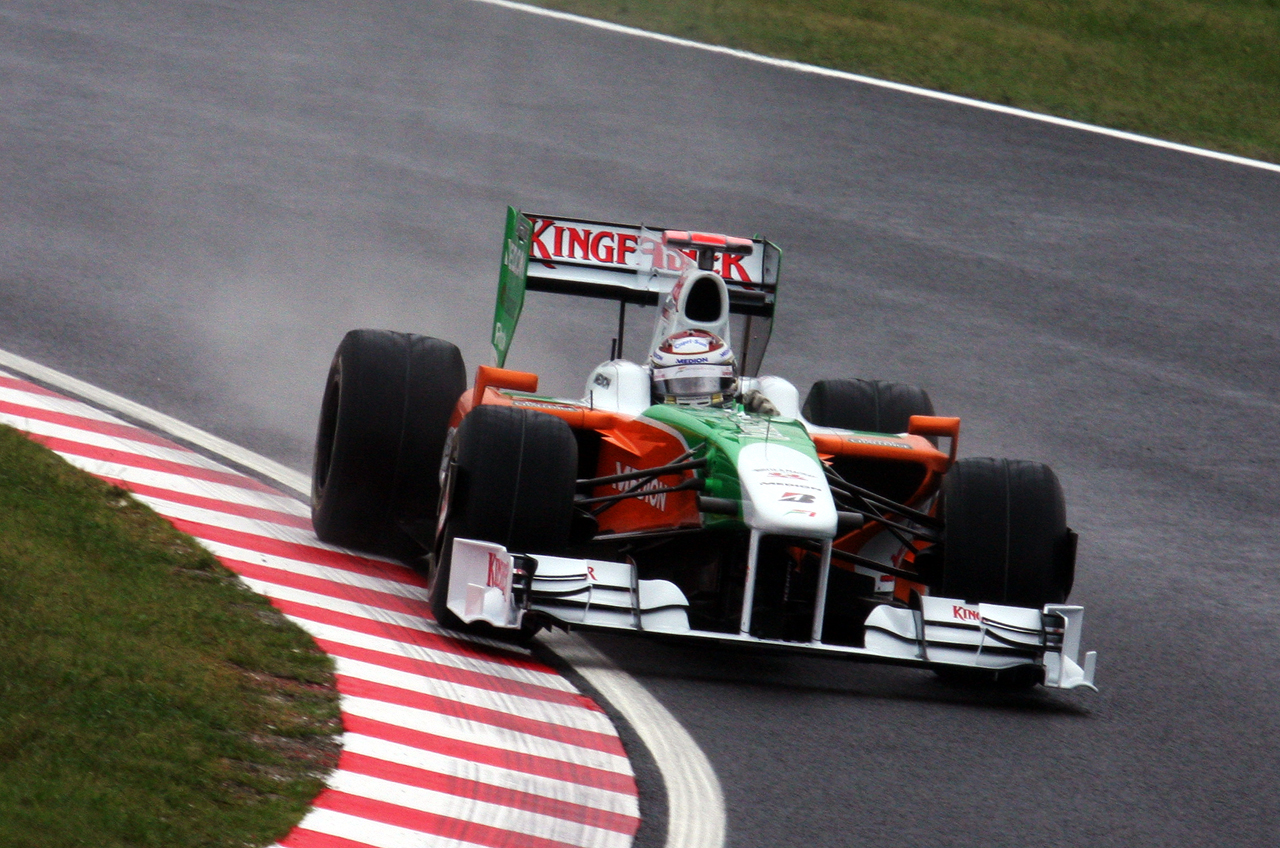
Curbs at the Suzuka International Racing Course

== Cultural identifiers ==
In certain parts of the world, curb design signifies cultural association. For example, in countries of the former Portuguese Empire, such as Brazil, curbs are often distinctively decorated (along with the footpaths more broadly) in a style known as Portuguese pavement, marking a clear link to Portugal, where the style originated. More explicitly, curbstones can be painted (by official sanction or otherwise) to stress an identity or ideology; for instance, in Northern Ireland, curbstones are frequently painted in communities to identify a religious/political affiliation – typically either red, white, and blue for Unionist/Loyalist areas, and green, white, and orange for Nationalist areas.

== See also ==
- Curb appeal
- Curb cut effect
- Curb extension
- Curb feeler
- Curb stomp
- Kassel kerb
- Kerb guidance
- Kerbside collection
- Road surface
- Wheel chock#Parking chocks—Curbs for parking spaces
