= Anne Swainson =

American product and graphic designer

- Born: Anna Elizabeth Swainson; October 1888; Nevada, Missouri
- Died: 1955; Chicago, Illinois
- Education: University of Missouri; Columbia University’s Teacher’s College; University of Chicago
- Occupation: Designer
- Known for: Bureau of Design founder

Anne Swainson (1888–1955) was an American product and graphic designer who became the head of design at the national retail company Montgomery Ward in Chicago, which was second in size only to Sears, Roebuck & Company at the time. There, she founded the company's Bureau of Design, which she ran from 1931 to 1955. It was believed to have been the first corporate industrial design department in modern American history.

== Biography ==
According to United States census records, Anna Elizabeth Swainson was born in October 1888 in Nevada, Missouri, to the Swedish immigrants Perrie and Bettie Swainson. (It has been reported incorrectly that Anna was born in 1900, in Sweden.) Anna attended the University of Missouri and received her B.S. degree in education (1909) and an M.A. in education from Columbia University’s Teacher’s College (1913), and finally, a second M.A. in household arts (1915) from the University of Chicago. From 1915 to 1919, she taught textiles at the famous Hull House, which had been established to empower women and teach residents about social and political issues of the day.

=== Designer ===
Swainson taught textile design and applied art in the early 1920s at the University of California, Berkeley (where she taught textile designer and weaver Dorothy Liebes) before moving to Chase Revere Copper to become its design director. There, her group, which included several female designers, created metal housewares that were both stylish and affordable. By 1928, Anna Elizabeth Swainson, educator, had changed her name to Anne Swainson, industrial designer.

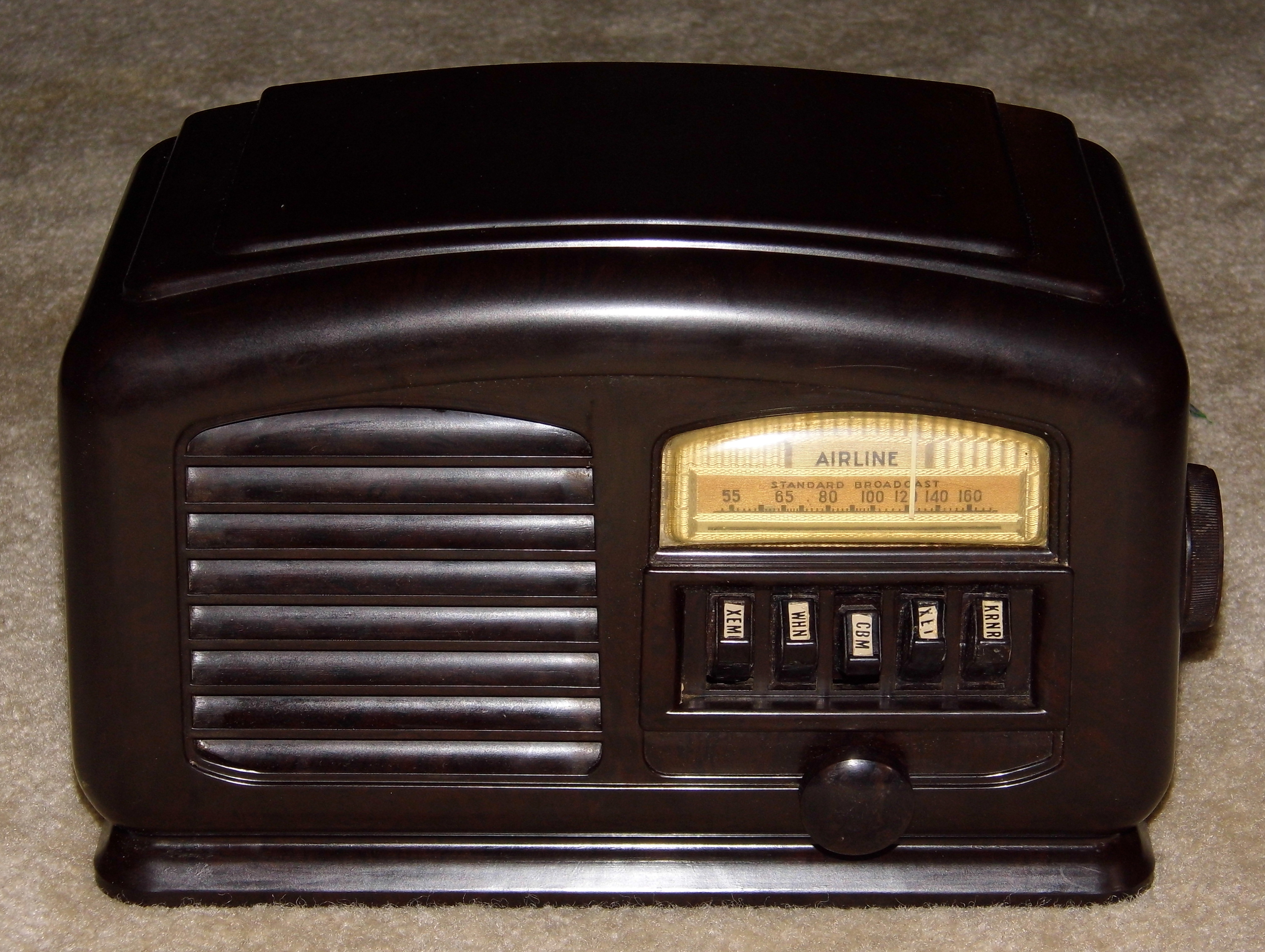
Popular Wards Push Button Table Radio, Deco Style, Circa 1941

In 1931, the catalog company Montgomery Ward in Chicago recruited Swainson to establish its new Bureau of Design, and from 1931 to 1955 she oversaw "the first corporate industrial design department in modern American history." By doing so, she also became the company's first female executive and was charged with modernizing the look of products and the pages of its nationally distributed mail-order catalog. Initially, she set up the Bureau with a group of 15 to 20 designers and hired more until she was managing a staff of 32 by 1935. In that group were 18 product designers and 14 package designers. The Ward products that were redesigned ranged from tires, arc welders, and radios, to toasters, flatware and other housewares.

For the famous Ward catalog, she replaced the traditional woodcut imagery with photographs featuring human models interacting with Ward products, some of them redesigned. Her department also simplified and modernized the layout of its pages and the typography and logos.

According to Viet, "Thanks to Swainson's industrious department and her pursuit of well designed products for the modern American consumer, Montgomery Ward rebounded from the Great Depression, and by 1939 saw nearly a half billion dollars in sales from its catalog and 618 stores."

At Montgomery Ward, according to the company's literature, which quotes a 1956 article in Industrial Design magazine, her legacy was significant.

“The success of the Bureau, depended, ultimately, on Anne Swainson’s winning the buyer’s confidence, persuading them of the value of better design on the market, and in the management of a business like Ward’s. The Bureau was her baby. She created not only its concept of service but its design attitude by her selection of staff.”

=== Personal life ===
Swainson remained unmarried and was still a Ward employee in 1955 when she died at her desk of a heart attack in Chicago at the age of 67.
