= Project Jonah =

Environmental organization

- Founded: 1974
- Type: Environmental organization
- Legal status: Charity
- Website: www.projectjonah.org.nz

Project Jonah is an international environmental organisation whose New Zealand branch was established in 1974 by Joan McIntyre. It specialises in the protection and conservation of marine mammals (including whales, dolphins and seals).

The key areas in which they work is rescuing stranded marine mammals, advocacy for marine mammals, and ensuring compliance with legislation. They are regularly involved in rescuing stranded whales around New Zealand. New Zealand has one of the highest rates of whale strandings with the beached whales, and marine mammals in general, being the responsibility of the Department of Conservation.

Project Jonah gave a major impetus for the government to create the Marine Mammals Protection Act 1978. The organization also trains volunteers as "Marine Mammal Medics".

== See also ==
- Anti-whaling
- Marine conservation activism
- Jonah, in the Bible
