= Curb cut =

Ramp from elevated sidewalk to road

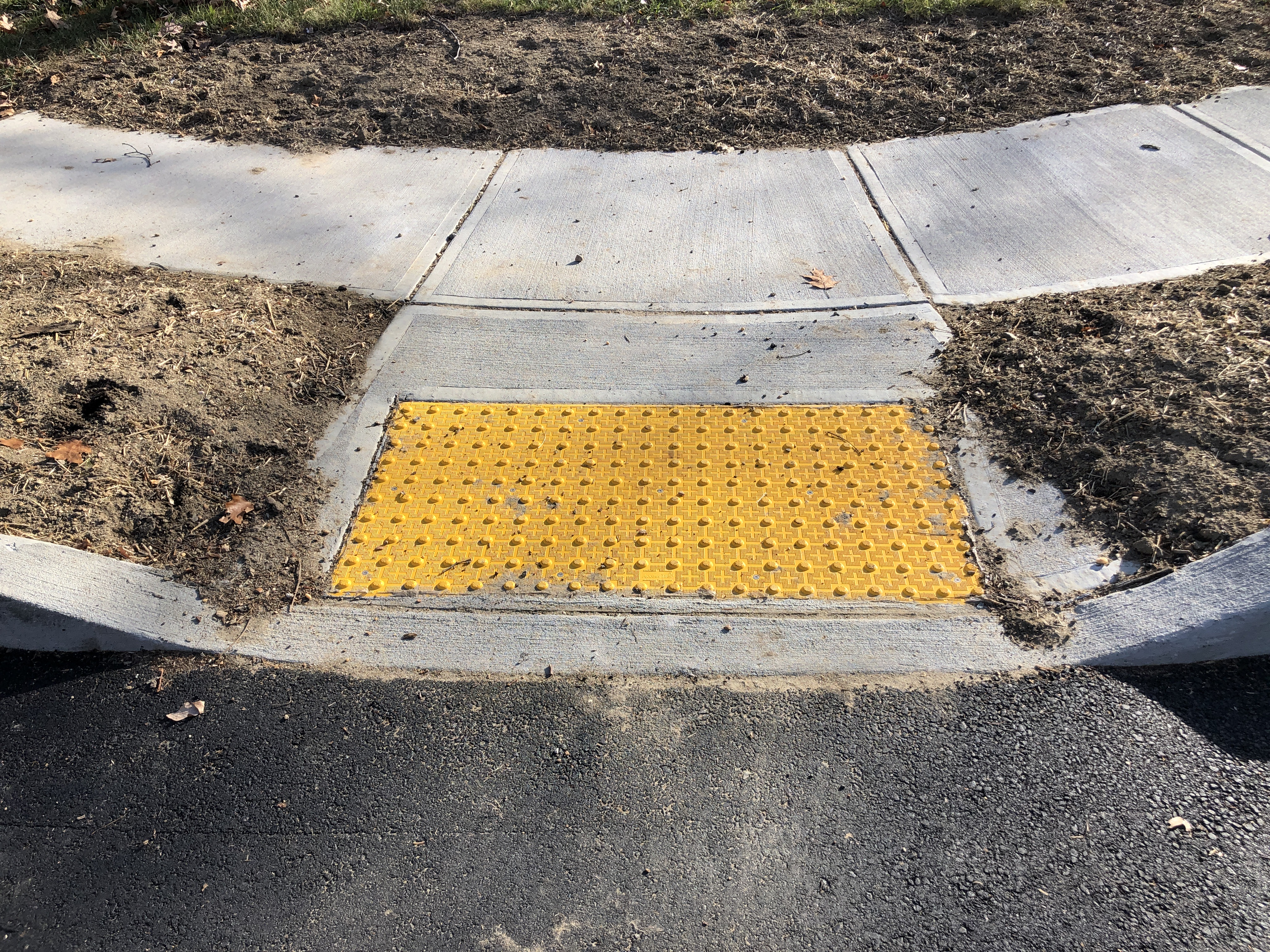
A pram ramp with tactile paving that connects a sidewalk to a road

A curb cut (U.S.), curb ramp, depressed curb, dropped kerb (UK), pram ramp, or kerb ramp (Australia) is a solid (usually concrete) ramp graded down from the top surface of a sidewalk to the surface of an adjoining street. It is designed primarily for pedestrian usage and commonly found in urban areas where pedestrian activity is expected. In comparison with a conventional curb (finished at a right angle 4–6 inches (10–15 cm) above the street surface) a curb cut is finished at an intermediate gradient that connects both surfaces, sometimes with tactile paving.

== History ==
Historically speaking, footpaths were finished at right angles to the street surface with conventional stepped curb treatments. Their introduction to help people pushing prams dates back at least as far as the 1930s in the UK.

Kalamazoo, Michigan installed curb cuts in the 1940s as a pilot project introduced by veteran and lawyer Jack H. Fischer to aid employment of veterans with disabilities. A major project in Berkeley, California led by the grassroots Center for Independent Living led to curb cuts up and down Telegraph and Shattuck Avenues creating an extensive path of travel. Following this, the value of curb cuts was promoted more strongly and their installation was often made on a voluntary basis by municipal authorities and developers.

Curb cuts in Western countries have been mandated by legislation such as the Americans with Disabilities Act of 1990 (ADA) in the United States (which requires that curb cuts be present on all sidewalks) or the Disability Discrimination Act 1992 in Australia. The legislative requirements in some jurisdictions have been increased from the original requirements in recent times, to the point where existing treatments can now fail to meet the most recent design requirements.

When the ramps are used by a broader population than just the disabled (for whom the curb cut requirement was legislated), this new convenience can be seen as a positive externality, and has become known as the curb cut effect.

== Users and uses ==
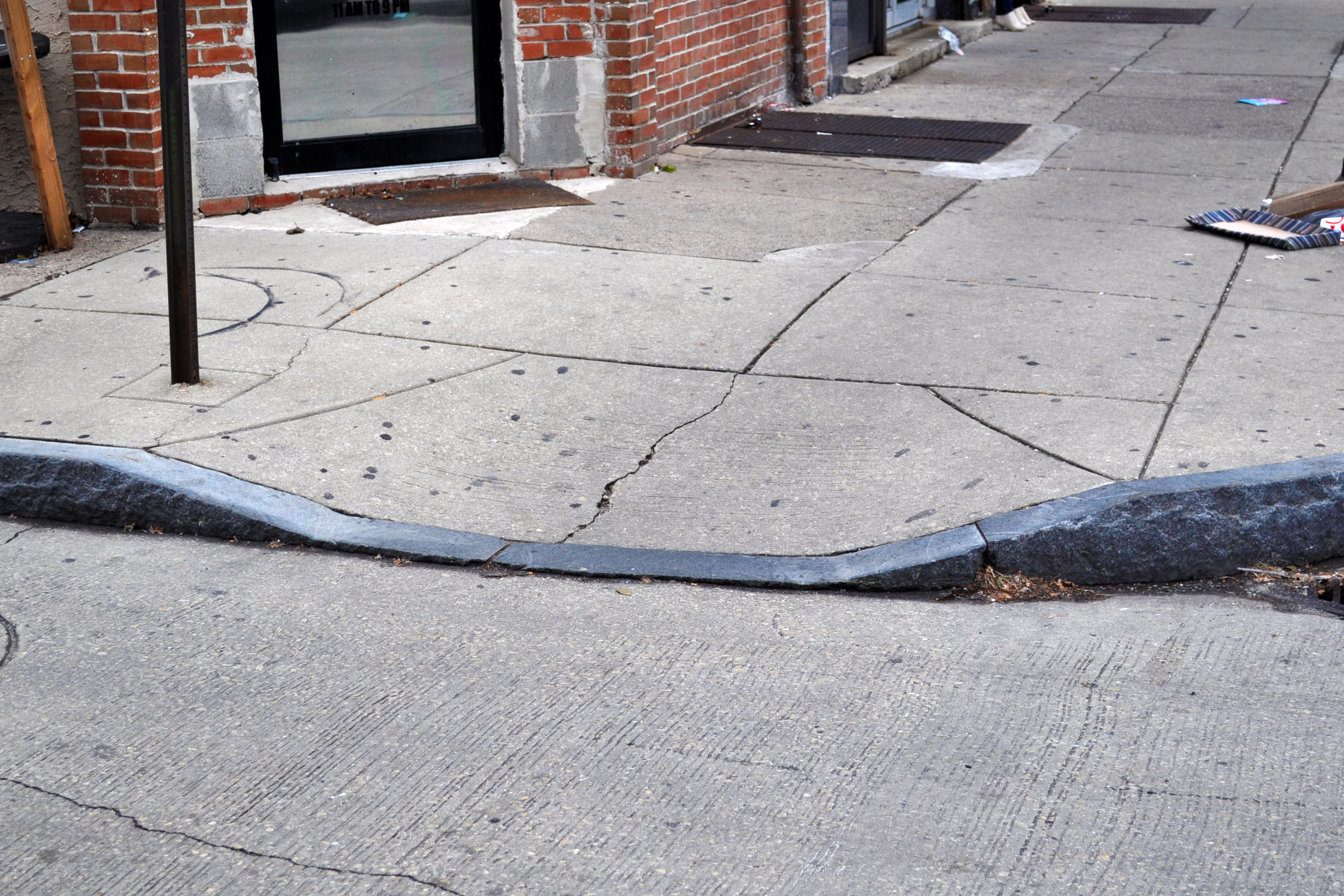
A curb cut at an intersection

Curb cuts at intersections allow for people with disabilities such as wheelchair users to move around safely, independently, and with less difficulty. Curb cuts typically feature tactile paving, a pattern of circular bumps that indicate to visually impaired pedestrians they are about to enter a roadway. Curb cuts also benefit other pedestrians and wheeled forms of transport, such as people with carts or cyclists.

The absence of a curb cut can lead to people with ambulatory disabilities forced to travel in the roadway, along side vehicle traffic. Even when present, a curb cut with a steep or uneven grade can be innavigable or lead to injuries.

== Other applications ==
A wider curb cut is also useful for motor vehicles to enter a driveway or parking lot on the other side of a sidewalk. In the UK this is commonly referred to as a 'crossover'.

Smaller curb cuts may be used along streets, parking areas or sidewalks in the manner of a water bar, redirecting water from the pavement to stormwater infiltration infrastructure, such as a grassed area or rain garden.

== Design ==
Accessible curb cuts transition from the low side of a curb to the high side (usually 15 cm or 5.9 in change in level). Accessible curb ramps are a minimum of 1 metre (3.28 ft) wide. They are sloped no greater than 1:12 (8.33%), which means that for every 12 cm (4.7 in) of horizontal distance, they rise no more than 1 cm (3/8 in). The concrete curb ramp is sometimes scored with grooves, the texture of which may serve as a warning to vision-impaired persons of the transition to the street. Such grooves also allow for traction and water runoff, and may be stained a color that significantly contrasts with the adjacent concrete. If a curb ramp contains flared sides, they are usually no greater than 1:10 (10%) slope.

Pram ramps in Australia are designed according to Australian Standard "AS 1428.1:2021", "Design for access and mobility, Part 1: General requirements for access - New building work".

=== Universal design ===
Proponents of universal design often point to the curb cut effect as an example when raising awareness of the benefits of this design philosophy.

== Enforcement and lack thereof ==
In the United States, the installation of curb cuts is legally mandated by the Americans with Disabilities Act (ADA). Shortly after the act's passage, a court ruling interpreted the act as requiring the installation of curb cuts whenever a street is repaved, under the rationale that "If a street is to be altered to make it more usable for the general public, it must also be made more usable for those with ambulatory disabilities". Despite this, compliance with the ADA with regard to curb cut installation has been spotty in many US cities, and advocates have often resorted to lawsuits to compel cities to install curb cuts. Aside from installation issues, curb cuts are not always maintained in working order, or are rendered unusable by illegally parked autos or failure to clear obstacles such as accumulated snow.

The city of Seattle agreed as part of a 2017 lawsuit settlement to install 1250 curb cuts each year for 18 years.

The city of Colorado Springs agreed as part of a 2019 lawsuit to install 1100 curb cuts each year for 14 years.

The city of Boston agreed as part of a 2021 lawsuit settlement to upgrade or repair 15000 curb cuts over the subsequent decade. However, renewed legal action just two years later alleged that the city had already fallen behind on the installation schedule, had installed ramps that were already falling apart, and had installed ramps that never met federal safety standards in the first place.

The city of Philadelphia agreed as part of a 2022 lawsuit settlement to install 2000 curb cuts every three years for the subsequent 15 years.

In Los Angeles, a turn-of-the-century plan to install 40000 curb cuts ended after several years, having installed just over half that number, and by 2025 the city averaged about 50 curb cut installations per year. At the same time, the city categorized an increasing number of its road resurfacing activities as "large asphalt repair", a term viewed by some urban planners and transportation engineers as a creative attempt to circumvent ADA mandates for curb cut installation and mandates under the 2024 Measure HLA to install pedestrian- and cyclist-oriented street improvements.

== See also ==
- Wheelchair ramp
- Americans with Disabilities Act
