= Beulah Quo =

American actress and activist (1923–2002)

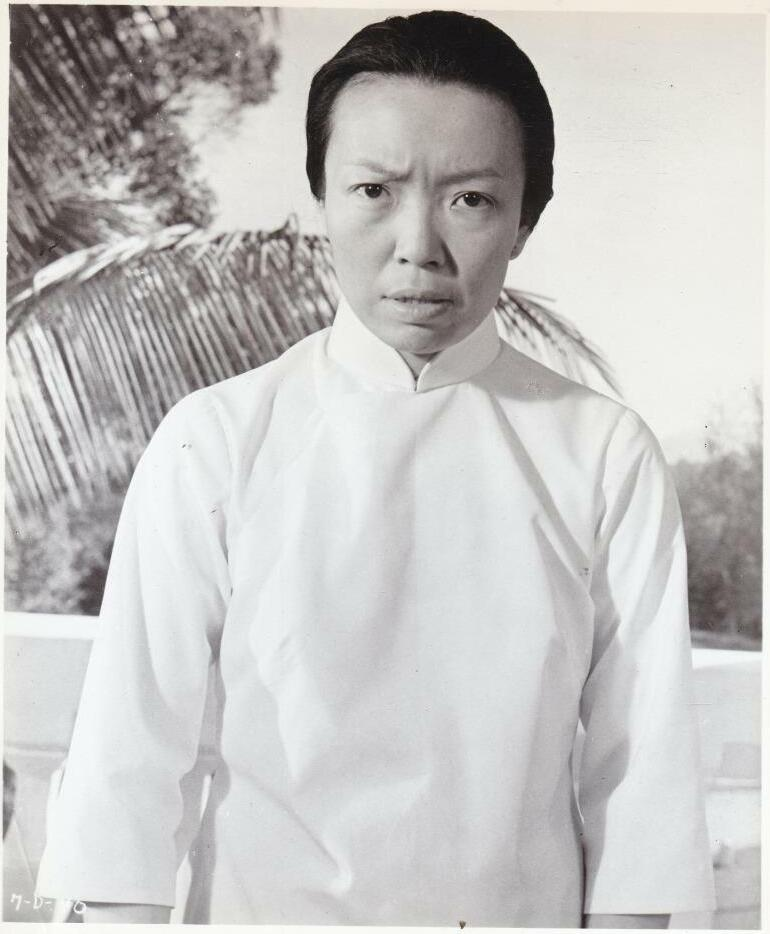
- Quo in a publicity photo for The 7th Dawn (1964)
- Born: Beulah Ong; April 17, 1923; Stockton, California, U.S.
- Died: October 23, 2002 (aged 79); La Mesa, California, U.S.
- Occupations: Actress, activist
- Years active: 1955–2002
- Spouse: Edwin Kwoh
- Children: Stewart Kwoh; Mary Ellen Shu

Beulah Quo (née Ong) (April 17, 1923 – October 23, 2002) was an American actress and activist born in Stockton, California. The spelling of her last name changed from Kwoh to Quo because she was constantly asked if KWOH was a radio station. She starred in many films and television series beginning in the mid-1950s, and was best known for her appearances in General Hospital (1963), Chinatown (1974), and Brokedown Palace (1999). She was also an advocate of more and better screen roles for Asian actors, and founded several organizations in pursuit of that goal.

== Early life ==
Beulah Quo was born Beulah Ong in Stockton, California, as the only child of two Chinese immigrants. She received a bachelor's degree in social welfare from UC Berkeley and a master's degree from the University of Chicago. While completing her master's degree, Quo met her husband, Edwin Kwoh, who was then a Chinese doctoral student at Columbia University. She also published her master's thesis entitled “The Occupational Status of American-Born Chinese Male College Graduates” in the American Journal of Sociology.

Both Quo and her husband were involved in Chinese Christian activism throughout their studies. Quo was particularly active in the Lake Tahoe Chinese Christian Youth Conferences during the 1940s. In the time she was involved in leading these conferences, Quo led discussions advocating for cross-racial cooperation and spoke out against the internment of Japanese Americans during WWII.

In the late 1940s, while she was working in China as a teacher, Quo escaped Communism on a U.S. destroyer along with her husband and infant son. After resettling, she also worked at the Chinese YWCA building, which is now the Chinese American National Museum and Learning Center.

== Television and film career ==
While teaching sociology at a community college in Los Angeles, California, director Henry King was looking for an Asian dialect coach and instead hired Quo to play a small role in Love is a Many-Splendored Thing (1953). She played over 100 roles in television movies and series, as well as film. One of her notable television roles was in General Hospital, where she stayed for six years and played a housekeeper and confidante named Olin starting in 1985. Uncredited appearances that she made throughout her career in her earlier work included her first film, Love is a Many-Splendored Thing, Two Weeks In Another Town (1962), and Gypsy (1962). Her final featured film role was in Forbidden City in 2001 as Mrs. Lee; her last television appearance was in a 2002 episode of Law and Order: Criminal Intent.

Quo co-starred in a made-for-television drama, An Apple, An Orange a story of two immigrants and their differences in cultural, sociological and philosophical viewpoints while in midlife. The program, produced by Maryland Public TV in association with Baltimore's Center Stage was telecast nationally in prime time on PBS. It aired on Oregon Public Broadcasting. The author and dramatist, Diane Johnson, won an O. Henry Award for the story on which it was based.

== Activism ==
In 1965, The East West Players, the first Asian-American repertory theater in the U.S., was co-founded by Quo and eight other actors, including James Hong. The East West Players continues to advocate for diverse representation and elimination of stereotypes of Asian-Americans in Hollywood and across mass media.

Quo was heavily involved in the high-profile and racially driven Vincent Chin case, producing a play to honor him entitled Carry The Tiger To The Mountain in July 1998. It was based on a true story of a Chinese-American man who was beaten to death in Detroit, Michigan, in 1982 by two white men who had mistaken him for a Japanese man. It premiered in West Virginia; Quo played Chin's mother, Lily Chin. The play was later performed in Los Angeles by the East West Players.

In 1997, Quo commissioned a musical project called "Heading East: California Asian Pacific American Experience" to promote and commemorate the history of Asian-Pacific Americans in California for the past 150 years.

Quo continued to dismiss any statements that Asians in leading roles are not "bankable", pointing out that Haing S. Ngor, cast in The Killing Fields (1984), won the Oscar for best supporting actor, while Pat Morita was nominated for the same award for his role in The Karate Kid (1984).

== Awards, nominations and honors ==
1978: Nominated for an Emmy for Outstanding Single Performance by a supporting actress in Meeting of Minds. Quo also co-narrated the audiobook version.

1990: "The Jimmie" Lifetime Achievement Award by the Asian Pacific American Artists, for her outstanding work on The Sand Pebbles (1966), MacArthur (1977), and Chinatown (1974). She also won a local Emmy award for her achievements on "James Wong Howe – The Man and His Movies", a documentary on the award-winning cinematographer James Wong Howe.

== Death ==
On October 23, 2002, Beulah Quo died of heart failure during emergency cardiac surgery in La Mesa, California at the age of 79.

The East West Players have a Beulah Quo and Edwin Kwoh Endowment set up to promote theater education.

== Filmography ==
Films and television appearances are from IMDb.

Year	Title	Role	Notes
1955	Love Is a Many-Splendored Thing	Third Aunt	Film, Uncredited
1961	Ada	Wife of Chinese Restaurant Proprietor	Film, Uncredited
1961	Flower Drum Song	Woman	Film, Uncredited
1961	Hawaiian Eye	Grandmother Tsu-Yin	TV
1962	Two Weeks in Another Town	Chinese Woman	Film, Uncredited
1962	Gypsy	Waitress	Film, Uncredited
1963	Girls! Girls! Girls!	Madam Yung	Film
1964	The 7th Dawn	Ah Ming	Film
1964	Kentucky Jones	Mrs. Tea-Store Fu	TV series (Episode "Mail Order Bride")
1966	The Sand Pebbles	Mama Chunk	Film
1970–1971	The Bill Cosby Show	Second Teacher / Mrs. Rogers	TV series
1971	The Rome with Love	Mrs. Okada	TV series
1971	If Tomorrow Comes	Midori	TV movie
1972	The Smith Family	Anna	TV series
1973	Voyage of the Yes	Native Nurse	TV movie
1973	Hawaii Five-O	Madame Souvang	TV series
1973	Genesis II	Primus Lu-Chan	TV movie
1974	Love, American Style	Lu See	TV series
1974	Chinatown	Maid	Film
1973–1974	Adam-12	Mrs. Tohito / Mrs. Hong Toy	TV series
1975	Police Story	The Supervisor	TV series
1975	The Last Survivors	Mrs. Peters	TV movie
1973–1975	Kung Fu	Madam Chun / Mai Chi / Soong's Wife	TV series
1976	S.W.A.T.	Madame Yang	TV series
1976	City of Angels	unknown	TV series
1977	Starsky and Hutch	Dr. Quo	TV series
1977	Baretta	Mrs. Chu	TV series
1977	MacArthur	Ah Cheu	Film
1977	Black Market Baby	Mrs. Yamato	TV movie
1978	Meeting of Minds	Tz'u-Hsi / Empress Tz'u-Hsi	TV series
1978	The Immigrants	So-Toy	TV movie
1979	How the West Was Won	Ah Kam	TV series
1979	Samurai	Hana Mitsubishi Cantrell	TV movie
1980	The Children of An Lac	Madame Ngai	TV movie
1981	The Incredible Hulk	Huyn	TV series
1982	The Letter	Ong's Mother	TV movie
1982	Yes, Giorgio	Mei Ling	Film
1982	Quincy M.E.	Mrs. Inoko	TV series
1982	Magnum, P.I.	Mrs. Iko Tamura	TV series
1982–1983	Marco Polo	Empress Chabi	TV mini-series
1985	Airwolf	Mae's Mother	TV series
1985	Street Hawk	Auntie Pearl	TV series
1985	Into the Night	Mrs. Yakamura	Film
1985	The Lady from Yesterday	Mai Ling Luong	TV movie
1985–1991	General Hospital	Olin	TV series
1986	MacGyver	Mrs. Chung	TV series
1986	Scarecrow and Mrs. King	unknown	TV series
1986	Alfred Hitchcock Presents	Herbalist	TV series
1986	Beverly Hills Madam	Lil's maid	TV movie
1986	American Geisha	Kangoro's Mother	TV movie
1987	Daniel and the Towers	Lynn Chow	TV movie
1987	Le palanquin des larmes	Mime Chen	Film
1988	Hunter	Mrs. Chin	TV series
1990	Forbidden Nights	Vice Dean Yin	TV movie
1994	Bad Girls	Chinese Herbalist	Film
1995	Bless This House	Old Woman	TV series
1996	Suddenly Susan	Dr. Ni	TV series
1998	Brimstone	Landlady	TV series
1999	ER	Grandma Fong	TV series
1999	Brokedown Palace	Guard Velie	Film
2000	Chicago Hope	Grandmother Wang	TV series
2000	The Michael Richards Show	Mai	TV series
2001	Forbidden City	Mrs. Lee	Short
2002	Law & Order: Criminal Intent	Cecilia Wang	TV series, (final appearance)
