= Stephanie Mills (journalist) =

American journalist and ecologist

Stephanie Ellen Mills
- Born: September 11, 1948 (age 77); Berkeley, CA
- Education: Mills College
- Occupations: Environmental writer; Editor; Salon organizer
- Notable work: Whaterver Happened to Ecology?; In Service to the Wild: Restoring and Reinhabiting Damaged Land

Stephanie Mills (born September 11, 1948) is an American environmentalist, author and journalist. She is known for her writing about ecology and the environment, and is considered one of the leading proponents of the bioregional movement. Utne Reader declared her a visionary, saying "she's like a latter-day Madame de Staël or Mabel Dodge, Mills has been an indefatigable organizer of salons; and from the corner store to environmental conferences to far-flung outposts of environmental activism."

== Early life and education ==
Mills was born in Berkeley, California, to Robert C. and Edith (Garrison) Mills. She earned a B.A. in Contemporary Thought from Mills College in 1969. She achieved early recognition for her valedictorian speech in June of that year entitled "The Future is a Cruel Hoax." The speech predicted a bleak future for humanity because of overpopulation and natural resource overuse. A New York Times reporter called it "perhaps the most anguished [valedictory] statement" of the year.

== Career ==
Following her interest in population issues, Mills worked as a campus organizer for Planned Parenthood. She gave many talks on the subject of overpopulation and the necessity of access to birth control. In 1970, she became Editor-in-Chief of Earth Times, a San Francisco-based environmental tabloid. She worked for CoEvolution Quarterly beginning as assistant editor, and becoming an editor between 1980 and 1982. She has also served as editor-in-chief of Earth Times, Not Man Apart, and Cry California'

Mills has worked with David Brower, Stewart Brand, Paul Ehrlich and cetaceon-champion Joan McIntyre, among others. She has held a number of academic positions at Mills College, Emory University, and World College West. Her work for non-profits includes Friends of the Earth, Foundation for National Progress, California Tomorrow, Earth First! Foundation, and the Northern Michigan Environmental Action Council.

She has worked as a freelance writer and lecturer since 1984. Mills is an advocate of bioregionalism, promoting locally sustainable economies and cultures. As someone who has shaped her own life in accord with deeply held personal values, her writing attempts to communicate the significance of major contemporary issues to the lives of individuals.

Mills' first book Whatever Happened to Ecology?, detailing the early years of the ecology movement, was called "one of the more engaging portraits of the era" by Kirkus Reviews.

Since 1985, she's been based in Maple City, Leelanau County, Michigan.

== Honors and awards ==
Mills received an award from Mademoiselle in 1969, an award from Friends of the United Nations Environment Program in 1987. In 1992 her work received a grant from the IRA-HITI Foundation. In 1992 she was named as an Utne Reader Visionary. She is a fellow at the Post Carbon Institute in Biodiversity and Bioregionalism. In 2009, she was awarded an honorary doctorate from her alma mater.

== Bibliography ==
- Whatever Happened to Ecology? (Sierra Club Books, 1989)
- In Praise of Nature (Island Press, 1990)
- In Service to the Wild: Restoring and Reinhabiting Damaged Land (Beacon Press, 1995)
- Turning Away from Technology (Sierra Club Books, 1997)
- Epicurean Simplicity (Island Press, 2002)
- Tough Little Beauties (Ice Cube Press, 2007)
- On Gandhi's Path: Bob Swann's Work for Peace and Community Economics (New Society Publishers, 2010)
- Simple Pleasures: Thoughts on Food, Friendship, and Life (Island Press, 2012)

== Personal life ==
In 1984, Mills left the Bay Area and moved to Leelanau County, Michigan. She married Philip Thiel in Michigan in 1985 and they later divorced in 1990.
