= Dorothy Liebes =

American textile designer and weaver

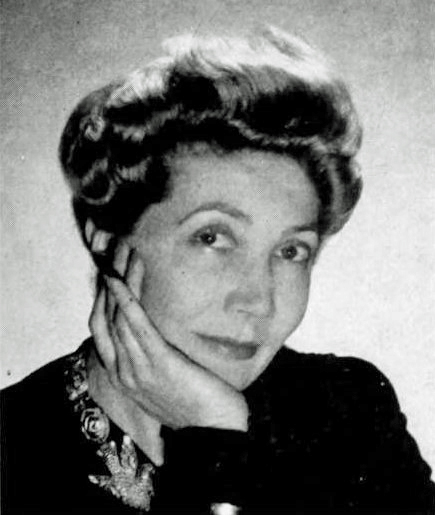
- Dorothy Liebes in 1946
- Born: Dorothy Wright; 14 October 1897; Santa Rosa, California, U.S.
- Died: 20 September 1972 (aged 74); New York City, New York, U.S.
- Education: San Jose State Teacher's College; University of California, Berkeley; Hull House, Chicago
- Occupation: Textile Designer
- Spouses: Leon Liebes (m. 1928–1940) Relman Morin (m. 1948–1972)
- Awards: Neiman Marcus Fashion Award (1938), American Institute of Decorators (1946), American Institute of Architects craftsmanship medal (1947), Elsie de Wolfe Award (1948)

Dorothy Wright Liebes (14 October 1897 – 20 September 1972) was an American textile designer and weaver renowned for her innovative, custom-designed modern fabrics for architects, interior designers, and fashion designers. She was known as "the mother of modern weaving".

== Early life ==
Born Dorothy Wright on October 14, 1897, in Santa Rosa, California, she was the daughter of Frederick L. Wright, a chemistry professor, and Bessie Calderwood Wright, a teacher. While studying anthropology, art, and teaching at the State Teachers College at San Jose (now San Jose State University) and at the University of California, Berkeley, she was a student of Anne Swainson and advised to experiment with textile design. She bought a small portable loom and taught herself how to weave.

In 1928, she married Leon Liebes, a businessman. They divorced in 1940, although Dorothy Liebes retained his surname professionally. In 1948 she married the Pulitzer Prize-winning journalist, Relman Morin.

== Career ==
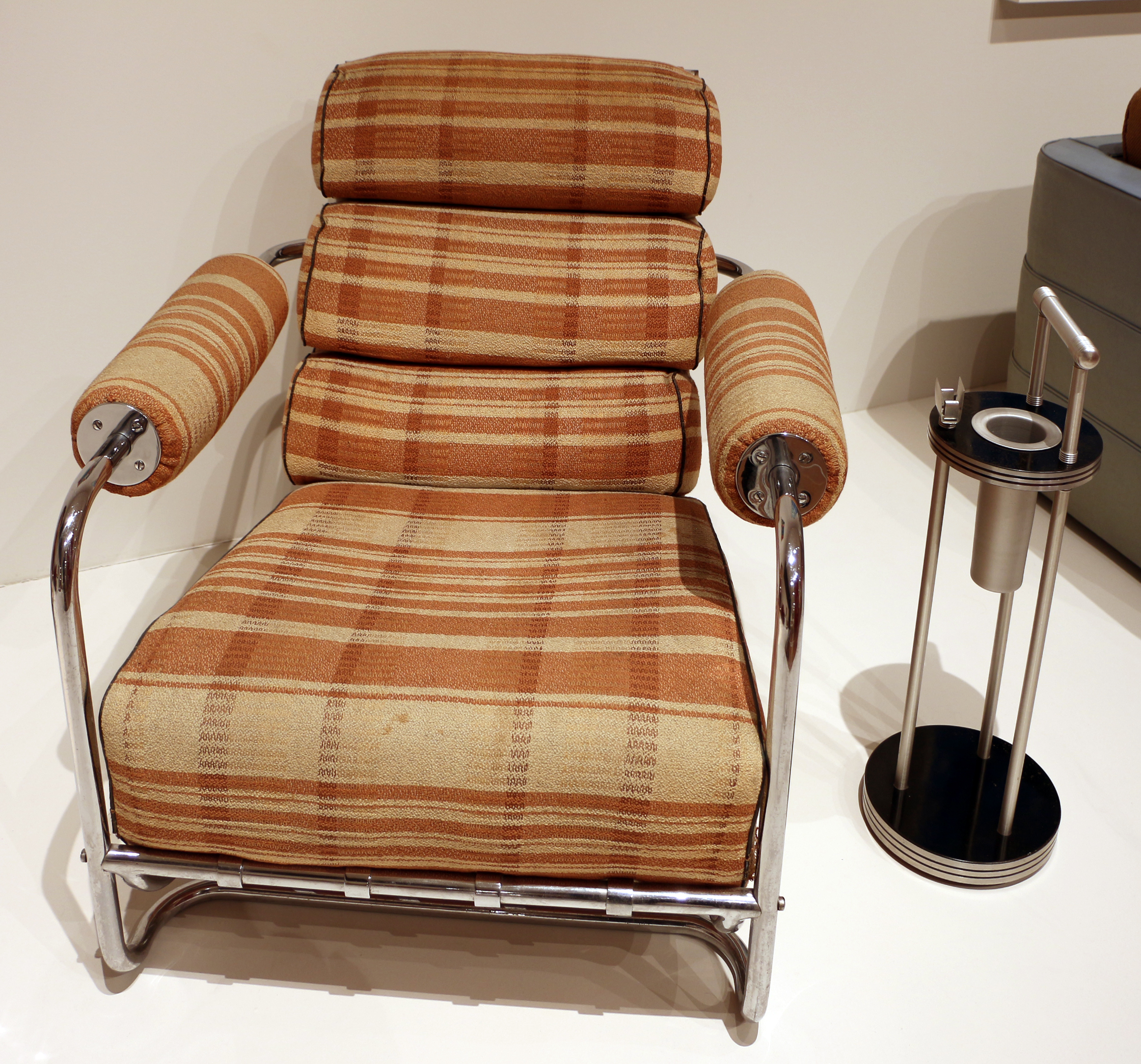
1934 Gilbert Rohde armchair upholstered in a Liebes textile

After several years as a schoolteacher, Liebes decided to become a textile designer, and studied weaving at Hull House, Chicago, and made study trips to France, Italy, Guatemala, and Mexico to learn about traditional weaving forms. After working abroad, Liebes returned to the United States and opened her eponymous studio in San Francisco. Her first studio, opened at 526 Powell Street in San Francisco in 1930, specialized in custom handwoven pieces for architects and interior designers. In 1935, Liebes met architect Frank Lloyd Wright at Taliesin in Spring Green, Wisconsin. Wright had an influence in her design philosophy. Dorothy Liebes Design, Inc. was opened in 1937, though her husband opposed, in San Francisco. By 1938 she had seventeen men and women working in her studio. In 1942, Liebes moved her studio in San Francisco to 545 Sutter Street. Following demand, she opened a second studio in New York. She relocated full-time to New York City in 1948.

Her fabrics were known for their bold color combinations and interesting textures, and often used unexpected materials such as feathers, plastics, metallics, jute, ticker tape, leather strips, and bamboo. They were commissioned by architects, including Frank Lloyd Wright, Edward Durell Stone, Miller and Pflueger and Samuel Marx. Other clients included King Ibn Saud of Saudi Arabia, the Ahwahnee Hotel in Yosemite, and the Paramount Theatre in Oakland, California. Her textiles were also used in airplanes, ocean liners, theatres and hotels. Frequently overlooked are Liebes's contributions to accessory and fashion design. Many pioneers of the "American Look" (Claire McCardell, Clare Potter, Pauline Trigère, Lilly Daché, Louella Ballerino, Adele Simpson, and Nettie Rosenstein) used fabrics designed by Liebes. Her close, personal relationships with costume designers Gilbert Adrian and Bonnie Cashin were forged in Hollywood, and thrived as each developed their own fashion lines. Her Hollywood connections, especially with Art Director Cedric Gibbons led to her distinctive modernist fabrics appearing in dozens of motion pictures. Most notably, her (uncredited) work appears in Adam's Rib (Metro-Goldwyn-Mayer, 1949) and East Side, West Side (Metro-Goldwyn-Mayer, 1949).

Writing for the Cooper Hewitt, Smithsonian Design Museum at the time of a 2023 exhibit of her work, writer Matthew J. Kennedy observed: "Liebes textiles excel materially through the motion picture; despite being devoid of color, they still read as Liebes’s designs. They also contribute to the use of modern design in film set decoration to characterize that which is anti-traditional, transgressive, and—in the case of East Side, West Side—glamorous and sexy."

The end of WWII was a pivotal moment for Liebes and her company. Synthetic materials that were created for and utilized in the war effort were then made available for domestic use. Aluminum, in particular, was of great interest to textile manufacturers. Liebes was excited and inspired by these possibilities, especially the innovative ways in which they could be worked and manipulated. She once remarked in a lecture to design students in Chicago, “Consider the shining cellophanes, dull acetates, lacquered plastics, treated leathers, artificial horsehair, non-tarnishable materials and glass threads!” Dorothy Liebes is often credited as a vital part of the California Modernist movement, and in the 1940s and 50s she was one of the most well-known textile designers in the United States. In contrast to the neutral palette of many of her modernist contemporaries, Liebes is well known for her unexpected use of materials, vibrant color and pattern. She had a penchant for combining seemingly mismatched colors in a cohesive, visually pleasing manner. Liebes famously called color a “magic elixir” and her textiles were characterized by their rich vibrant hues. She coined this the “California Look”, which quickly was referred to as the “Liebes Look”.

Dorothy Liebes was a weaver and a businesswoman who believed that mass-produced textiles could reach wider audiences, regardless of client budgets. While still retaining a handwoven appearance, Liebes worked to design power-loomed fabric in different styles and materials. Not only were her textiles accessible, but she made a powerful partner for industry.

Liebes was a design consultant for companies such as DuPont, Dow, Bigelow-Sanford, and Goodall Fabrics of Sanford, Maine. A promoter of textile mass-production, she advised on the development of synthetic fibers, and assisted in the development of machinery that could replicate the aesthetic irregularities and unevenness of hand-loomed fabrics. From 1955 to 1971 Liebes acted as DuPont's home furnishings consultant. As a spokesperson for the company, she helped the general public overcome adversities to synthetic fabrics.

Liebes is recognized for introducing therapeutic craft programs for World War II veterans across America. In 1942, she was appointed as National Director, Division of Arts & Skills, American Red Cross.

From 1961 to 1972, acclaimed artist Emma Amos worked as a designer/weaver for Dorothy Liebes.

== Awards ==
Dorothy Liebes was one of the first recipients of the Neiman Marcus Fashion Award at their launch in 1938. In 1946, one of her designs was chosen best textile by the American Institute of Decorators The following year, 1947, she received the Craftsmanship Medal from the American Institute of Architects. She also received prizes and awards from Lord & Taylor, the Paris Exposition, and the Architectural League. In 1948, she received an honorary degree from Mills College and the Elsie de Wolfe Award. In 1970 Liebes received the American Craft Council Gold Medal for Consummate Craftsmanship.

== Death ==
Due to a heart condition, Dorothy Liebes semi-retired in 1971. She died in New York City on September 20, 1972.

== Legacy ==
Her work is held in the collection of the Cooper-Hewitt, National Design Museum, the Victoria and Albert Museum, the Art Institute of Chicago, Smithsonian Institution's Archives of American Art, and the Phoebe A. Hearst Museum of Anthropology at University of California, Berkeley.

In 2023 the Cooper Hewitt held a retrospective of Liebes' work entitled A Dark, A Light, A Bright: The Designs of Dorothy Liebes. The exhibition earned the 2022 Prize for Excellence and Innovation from the Decorative Arts Trust.
