= Angela Glover Blackwell =

American attorney, civil rights advocate, and author

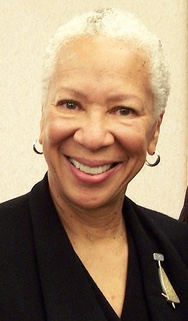
- Blackwell in 2012
- Born: 1944 or 1945 (age 80–81); St. Louis, Missouri, U.S.
- Occupations: Founder in Residence, PolicyLink; Lecturer, Goldman School of Public Policy

Academic background
- Education: Howard University (BA); University of California, Berkeley (JD)

Academic work
- Notable works: "The Curb-Cut Effect" in the Stanford Social Innovation Review
- Website: radicalimagination.us

Angela Glover Blackwell (born 1944 or 1945) is an American attorney, civil rights advocate, and author. In 1999, she founded the research and advocacy nonprofit organization PolicyLink, and after twenty years as president and CEO, became the Founder in Residence. Blackwell has regularly provided expert commentary in a variety of news media and hosts the podcast Radical Imagination.

== Early life and education ==
Blackwell is one of three children born to Philmore and Rose Glover. Her parents were educators; her father was a high school administrator, and her mother a teacher. She grew up during racial segregation in St. Louis, Missouri, and then completed a B.A. at Howard University in 1967.

In 2005, Blackwell discussed her childhood in St. Louis with Yes! magazine, stating, "For African-American families such as my own, community was the scaffolding that allowed us to achieve our visions in a society where we were locked out of the mainstream. By building strong communities, we were able to create our own pathways to personal fulfillment."

She completed her J.D. at the University of California at Berkeley School of Law in 1977.

== Career ==
Blackwell was a Managing Attorney at the public-interest law firm Public Advocates from 1977 to 1987, which included work on class action lawsuits and firm strategy development. In 1979, she advocated for a grocery store in Bayview–Hunters Point, San Francisco, and while unsuccessful at the time, Gov. Jerry Brown then formed a commission to address the issue of food deserts.

In 1987, Blackwell founded Urban Strategies Council in Oakland, California, which focuses on the needs of children and families with data-driven public policy advocacy and community organizing. After her work at the Urban Strategies Council, Blackwell was then a senior vice president and oversaw the Domestic and Cultural divisions at the Rockefeller Foundation for three years, where she focused on policy issues related to race and inclusion, and developed programs.

In 1999, Blackwell founded PolicyLink, a research and advocacy nonprofit organization focused on economic and social equity for low-income people and communities of color, staffed by attorneys and public policy experts in California, Washington, D.C., and New York. In 2011, Blackwell was appointed to the President's Advisory Council on Faith-Based and Neighborhood Partnerships.

In 2014, Blackwell was appointed to the President's Advisory Commission on Educational Excellence for African Americans. A 2014 article in Social Policy highlighted her keynote address at a symposium about equitable development at George Washington University, stating she "reminded the group how neighborhood determines [...] virtually all aspects of the quality of life, including life expectancy itself," and quoting her saying, "Tell me your zip code and I'll tell you your expiration date."

In 2018, Blackwell transitioned from her role as president and CEO to Founder in Residence at PolicyLink. In 2018, she also joined the faculty of the Goldman School of Public Policy at the University of California, Berkeley as a lecturer.

In 2019, Blackwell began her podcast Radical Imagination, which hosts experts for discussions about what Sarah Larson at The New Yorker described as "big ideas, including reparations, housing as a human right, universal basic income, and [...] police abolition."

In April 2020, Blackwell was appointed to the California Task Force on Business and Jobs Recovery. In 2023, she was discussed in news media as one of several people who might be selected by California Governor Gavin Newsom to serve for the remainder of the term of U.S. Senator Dianne Feinstein.

== Commentary ==
Blackwell has regularly appeared as a guest on Moyers & Company as a social justice expert, including in 1995, to discuss rebuilding communities, in 2004, to discuss economic and social equity, in 2012, to discuss her optimism, and in 2014, to discuss systemic racism. Blackwell has also regularly appeared on C-SPAN networks, beginning in 1994. Blackwell also appeared on NPR in 2007 to discuss a study from the Pew Charitable Trusts on economic mobility, and on PBS NewsHour in 2014 to discuss progress made after fifty years of the War on Poverty.

In 2009 and 2010, Blackwell wrote commentary about national health policy for The Washington Post. In 2017, Blackwell wrote "The Curb-Cut Effect" in Stanford Social Innovation Review, about how laws and programs designed for vulnerable groups often benefit everyone, followed by "Civil Society and Authentic Engagement in a Diverse Nation" in 2018. Blackwell further expounded on the curb-cut effect in a 2017 opinion article in The New York Times titled "Infrastructure Is Not Just Roads and Bridges."

As founder in residence at PolicyLink, Blackwell has continued to provide expert commentary on economic and social justice issues, including as the keynote speaker at the 2020 "Racism and the Economy" conference series hosted by the presidents of the Atlanta, Boston, and Minneapolis Federal Reserve Banks. In 2020, Blackwell co-authored opinion articles in The New York Times, The Los Angeles Times, and The Mercury News.

== Personal life ==
Blackwell is married to Dr. Fred Blackwell, an orthopedic surgeon. She has two children, and several grandchildren. She has lived in Oakland, California since the early 1970s. Her brother, David E. Glover, was a longtime executive director of the Oakland Citizens Committee for Urban Renewal (OCCUR).

== Honors and awards ==
- 1994 Honorary Degree, Mills College
- 2014 Richman Fellowship in Public Life, Brandeis University
- 2017 Peter E. Haas Public Service Award, University of California, Berkeley
- nominee, 2017 Visionary of the Year award, San Francisco Chronicle and the School of Economics and Business Administration at St. Mary's College
- 2018 John W. Gardner Leadership Award, Independent Sector

== Selected works ==
- Angela Glover Blackwell (2006). "Ensuring Broad Access To Affordable Neighborhoods That Connect To Opportunity". In Smiley, Tavis (ed.). The Covenant with Black America. Third World Press. ISBN 9780883782774.
- Angela Glover Blackwell (2007). "Fighting poverty with equitable development". In Edwards, John; Crain, Marion; Kalleberg, Arne L. (eds.). Ending Poverty in America: How to Restore the American Dream. The New Press. ISBN 9781595581761.
- Blackwell, A.G., Kwoh, S., Pastor, M. Uncommon Common Ground: Race and America’s Future, New York: W. W. Norton & Company, 2010. ISBN 9780393336856.
- Angela Glover Blackwell (2014). "Foreward". Worlds Apart: Poverty and Politics in Rural America. By Duncan, Cynthia M. (Second ed.). New Haven (Conn.) London: Yale University Press. ISBN 9780300196597.
- Angela Glover Blackwell (December 8, 2015). "Race, Place, and Financial Security: Building Equitable Communities of Opportunity". In Federal Reserve Bank of San Francisco and Corporation for Enterprise Development (ed.). What It's Worth: Strengthening the Financial Future of Families, Communities and the Nation. Federal Reserve Bank of San Francisco.

=== Articles ===
- Blackwell, Angela Glover (2017). "The Curb-Cut Effect". Stanford Social Innovation Review. 15 (1). doi:10.48558/yvms-cc96.
- Blackwell, Angela Glover (June 9, 2017). "Infrastructure Is Not Just Roads and Bridges". The New York Times.
- Blackwell, Angela Glover (2018). "Civil Society and Authentic Engagement in a Diverse Nation". Stanford Social Innovation Review. doi:10.48558/rfwr-mz45.
- Blackwell, Angela Glover (2023). "How We Achieve a Multiracial Democracy". Stanford Social Innovation Review. 21 (2). doi:10.48558/2x7g-ta86.

== See also ==
- PolicyLink
- Curb cut effect
