= Marine Mammals Protection Act =

Act of Parliament in New Zealand

Marine Mammals Protection Act 1978

New Zealand Parliament
- Long title: An Act to make provision for the protection, conservation, and management of marine mammals within New Zealand and within New Zealand fisheries waters
- Royal assent: 20 October 1978
- Commenced: 1 January 1979
- Status: Current legislation

The Marine Mammals Protection Act 1978 is an Act of Parliament passed in New Zealand in 1978. It is administered by the Department of Conservation.

The environmental organisation Project Jonah gave the major impetus for the government to create the Act.

== See also ==
- Whaling in New Zealand
