= Relman Morin =

20th-century American journalist

Relman George Morin
- Born: September 11, 1907; Freeport, Illinois
- Died: July 16, 1973 (aged 65); New York City
- Education: Pomona College
- Occupation: Journalist
- Spouse: Dorothy Wright Liebes
- Writing career
- Subject: World news
- Notable awards: Pulitzer Prize for International Reporting; 1951; Pulitzer Prize for National Reporting; 1958

Relman George Morin (September 11, 1907 – July 16, 1973) was an American journalist who spent most of his career writing for the Associated Press, serving as bureau chief of its offices in Tokyo, Paris, Washington, D.C., and New York.

Arrested by the Japanese in Saigon on the day after the attack on Pearl Harbor, Morin was held prisoner for six months. He reported from the European front during World War II and was present at the signing of the peace treaty between the Allies and Germany. He was also a war correspondent during the Korean War.

He won the Pulitzer Prize twice, once for his Korean War reportage and once for his reportage on the Little Rock school integration crisis in 1957.

== Early life, education, and early career ==
Morin was born in Freeport, Illinois, and raised in Los Angeles, California. He graduated from a Los Angeles high school in 1925, then went on to study at Pomona College. He began his journalism career by working as an office boy and part-time sports reporter for the Los Angeles Times while in high school and college (1924–26). He graduated from Pomona in 1929.

He then went to study in China, first at Lignan University in Canton (now Guangzhou), where he was a "special student," then at Yenching University in Peking (now Beijing). In 1930, while in China, he worked as a reporter for the Shanghai Evening Post.

Returning to the U.S., Morin wrote movie columns for the Los Angeles Record from 1932 to 1934.

== Career with Associated Press ==
He joined the Associated Press in 1934, working in its Los Angeles bureau. He would remain with the AP for almost 40 years, serving as Los Angeles editor (1934–37), Tokyo bureau chief (1937–40), Far East correspondent (1940–41), war correspondent (1942–45); and bureau chief in Paris (1945–47) and Washington, D.C. (1947–49). In New York he served as general executive at AP headquarters from 1949 to 1950; thereafter he ran AP's New York bureau until 1972.

Morin was in Mongolia in 1939 when the Russians defeated the Japanese in a border clash there. In December 1940, he began a one-year roving assignment through southeast Asia. In seeking to explore areas lying in the path of Japanese expansion, he visited the regions then known as the Netherlands East Indies, French Indo-China, the British colony of Singapore, and independent Thailand, as well as Shanghai and Manila. He spent six months in Java during the protracted economic negotiations between Japan and the Netherlands Indies. He was present to cover the Japanese occupations of both Thailand and French Indo-China. He was beaten by Thai soldiers, and was arrested by the Japanese in Saigon on December 8, 1941, and "closely examined on espionage charges." From December 1941 to August 1942, he was imprisoned by the Japanese secret police, who "threatened him with torture if he did not write treasonable propaganda for Japanese broadcasts." He returned to the U.S. in September 1942, and in the spring of 1943 crossed the Atlantic to report on the war in the European theater.

He considered the Dutch Empire to be more "wise and kindly" than others, but he was "no apologist for empire," wrote Orville Prescott. "No recent writer disgusted with the snobbery, decadence and general dry rot of Singapore has been more outspoken than he."

His essay "In a Schoolhouse at Rheims, Four Copies Were Signed" is an eyewitness account of the surrender of Wehrmacht chief Colonel general Alfred Jodl, German Navy commander General admiral Hans-Georg von Friedeburg, and Major G. S. Wilhelm Oxenius, to Allied officers, including General Carl A. Spaatz and Lieutenant general Walter Bedell Smith, at 2:47 A.M. On May 7, 1945.

In the essay, Morin wrote: "'There are four copies to be signed.' Gen. Smith’s voice was cold, colorless, matter-of-fact. He spoke without haste. Neither tone nor cadence hinted at his feelings....There was a moment of silence, and in that moment, the scene seemed to freeze. It had the character of a picture, somehow, a queer unreality. Here was the end of nearly five years of war, of blood and death, of high excitement and fear and great discomfort, of explosions and bullets whining and the wailing of air raid sirens. Here, brought into this room, was the end of all that. Your mind refused to take it in. Hence, this was a dream, this room with the Nile green walls and the charts, the black table, and the uniformed men seated around it. The words, 'There are four copies to be signed,' meant nothing unless you forced the meaning to come, ramming it into your brain with a hard, conscious effort....And then the documents were being passed across to the Germans, and they were signing them. They were signing away the Germany Army and the Luftwaffe and the submarines. Their pens scratched and the State that was to have lasted a thousand years died."

In July 1950 he went to Tokyo on assignment, and when the Korean War began he went to Korea to report from the front.

He witnessed the execution of Julius and Ethel Rosenberg on June 19, 1953.

He had a heart attack that sidelined him for several months in 1955.

In 1957, he reported on the school integration crisis at Little Rock High School. From a phone booth near the school, he "calmly dictated" his story of "how Negro students slipped in a side entrance past an unruly mob." This won him his second Pulitzer Prize.

He died in New York City.

== Books ==
Morin wrote Circuit of Conquest (1943) about his travels in Asia and his detention by the Japanese. Reviewing the book in the New York Times, Orville Prescott called it "one of the best books on the decline and fall of Western power in the Far East" and stated that while several of the other journalists who had been detained by the Japanese had already published accounts of their experiences, Morin's book "makes up for its lack of spot news value with intelligent, considered judgment and an unusually high quality of narrative skill....About the places where he sojourned only briefly Mr Morin writes with the verve, color and sharp eye for dramatic detail of the best kind of personal travel literature. About the countries where he had opportunities for more extensive study and investigation he is penetrating, objective and highly informative."

He also wrote East Wind Rising: A Long View of the Pacific Crisis (1960), A Reporter Reports (1960); Churchill: Portrait of Greatness (1965), Assassination: The Death of President John F. Kennedy (1968), Dwight D. Eisenhower: A Gauge of Greatness (1969), and The Associated Press Story of Election 1968 (1969).

== Honors and awards ==
In 1951, Morin won the Pulitzer Prize for International Reporting for his coverage of the Korean War. He shared it with several other journalists for the AP, Chicago Daily News, and New York Herald Tribune who had also reported from Korea.

In 1958, he won the Pulitzer Prize for National Reporting for his coverage of the Little Rock school crisis. The citation praised "his dramatic and incisive eyewitness report of mob violence on September 23, 1957, during the integration crisis at the Central High School in Little Rock, Arkansas." He shared the prize with Clark Mollenhoff of the Des Moines Register and Tribune.

He twice won the George Polk Award in Journalism. In 1954 he was one of a team of AP writers who received the prize for Wire Service Reporting; in 1957, he was the sole winner of the award for National Reporting.

== Personal life ==
Morin was married twice. He had a daughter, Mary Frances Morin Sasanoff (Robert), from his first marriage to Florence Pine. His second wife, Dorothy Wright Liebes, was a textile designer. Born in Santa Rosa, California, on October 14, 1899, Liebes was first married to and divorced from Leon Liebes. She was "one of the first American craftsmen to adapt intricate hand techniques to mass production that allowed her fabrics to be used by major manufacturers." The magazine House & Garden called her "probably the greatest weaver alive today." Morin and Liebes were married in Berkeley, California, on April 21, 1948. She died in September 1972.
