= Asian Americans Advancing Justice Southern California =

American nonprofit organization

- Formation: 1983; 43 years ago
- Type: 501(c)(3) organization
- Tax ID no.: 95-3854152
- Headquarters: Los Angeles, California
- Key people: Stewart Kwoh (Founder and President Emeritus) Connie Chung Joe (CEO)
- Website: ajsocal.org
- Formerly called: Asian Americans Advancing Justice Los Angeles

Asian Americans Advancing Justice Southern California (AJSOCAL) formerly known as Asian Americans Advancing Justice Los Angeles (Advancing Justice LA), is a non-profit legal aid and civil rights organization dedicated to advocacy, providing legal services and education and building coalitions on behalf of the Asian Americans, Native Hawaiian, and Pacific Islander (NHPI) communities. AJSOCAL was founded in 1983 as the Asian Pacific American Legal Center (APALC).

AJSOCAL is a legal and civil rights organization for Asian Americans, Native Hawaiians, and Pacific Islanders (NHPI). AJSOCAL is located in Los Angeles, California, and also has satellite offices in Orange County and Sacramento.

== Overview ==
Founded in 1983 as the Asian Pacific American Legal Center (APALC) following the killing of Vincent Chin, AJSOCAL serves more than 15,000 individuals and organizations every year. Through direct services, impact litigation, policy advocacy, leadership development, and capacity building, AJSOCAL focuses on the most vulnerable members of Asian American and NHPI communities while also building a voice for civil rights and social justice. Asian Americans Advancing Justice Southern California is part of Asian Americans Advancing Justice, a national affiliation of four civil rights nonprofit organizations whose members also include Asian Americans Advancing Justice - Chicago, Asian Americans Advancing Justice - AAJC (National Affiliate) and Asian Americans Advancing Justice - ALC (San Francisco).

AJSOCAL serves its clients in numerous languages including Korean, Japanese, Mandarin, Cantonese, Khmer, Indonesian, Tagalog, and Vietnamese, along with English and Spanish. AJSOCAL is a legal organizations in Los Angeles County that maintains this breadth of language capacity, and thus is an important resource to limited English proficient speakers who are in need of legal assistance. AJSOCAL also advocates through the courts and legislature on many issues, including: voting rights, workers' rights, immigration, domestic violence, race discrimination, and language rights. AJSOCAL is also noted for its interethnic relations and multiracial coalition building through youth, parent and community-focused leadership development programs, as well as its work in hate crimes prevention, race relations, and LGBT alliance building.

In 1995, AJSOCAL served as the lead counsel in a groundbreaking federal civil rights lawsuit, Bureerong v. Uvawas, on behalf of 80 Thai garment workers who had been trafficked into the United States, held illegally, and forced to work behind barbed wire and under armed guard in an apartment complex in El Monte, California. Once freed from the apartment, the workers were taken by the U.S. government and thrown into federal detention. Eventually, the work of AJSOCAL, along with a coalition of advocacy groups in Los Angeles, led to the release of all the workers. AJSOCAL, along with other advocates, then led the successful workers' rights lawsuit against the manufacturers and retailers responsible for the sweatshop conditions.

== Programs ==
=== Demographics ===
AJSOCAL invests significant resources in collecting, analyzing and disseminating ethnic and language-specific demographic data on Asian Americans.

Beginning in the early 1990s, AJSOCAL has surveyed Asian American and other voters during major elections to capture data on APA voters that is missing from mainstream exit polling. For the November 2008 presidential election, AJSOCAL's exit poll surveyed over 4,000 voters in Los Angeles and Orange Counties on Election Day in English, Spanish, Chinese, Japanese, Vietnamese, Tagalog, Korean, and Hindi.

In 2008, AJSOCAL released a number of demographic reports. Asian Americans at the Ballot Box: The 2006 General Election in Orange County offered a comprehensive look at Asian American participation in California's 2006 gubernatorial election, including Asian American voter registration and turnout, support for candidates and ballot measures, views on immigration reform and use of bilingual voter assistance. LA Speaks: Language Diversity and English Proficiency by Los Angeles County Service Planning Area highlighted the demographics of the limited English proficient communities in Los Angeles County by Service Planning Area (SPA). The report found that five of the eight SPAs countywide are majority non-English speaking, and that Latino and Asian American communities faced the greatest challenges, with 48% and 43%, respectively, experiencing some difficulty communicating in English.

In partnership with the Tomás Rivera Policy Institute, AJSOCAL released a joint publication, Disaster Preparedness in Urban Immigrant Communities: Lessons Learned from Recent Catastrophic Events and Their Relevance to Latino and Asian Communities in Southern California, which found that immigrant and limited English proficient communities are not fully incorporated in disaster preparedness educational efforts and emergency response plans, and provides recommendations to personnel and government officials in better prepare immigrant communities in major disasters.

=== Immigration reform ===
AJSOCAL has worked with other immigrant rights organizations to demand fair and humane immigration legislation. To ensure an AAPI voice in the immigration debate, AJSOCAL has collected individual stories to demonstrate to the media and the larger public the significant impact that proposed policies would have on AAPI communities. In 2008, Advancing Justice - LA produced a report about the family immigration backlog entitled A Devastating Wait: Family Unity and the Immigration Backlogs highlighting family backlogs—which for some family categories are as long as 23 years—and the impact on Asian American communities and families.

=== Voting rights ===
During the 2008 elections, AJSOCAL worked with Asian American community-based organizations to conduct non-partisan voter mobilization efforts, helping AAPI voters overcome common voting barriers. The mobilization efforts included bilingual phone banks, voter hotlines, and materials translated into Asian languages. The get-out-the-vote effort for both the June primary and November Presidential elections proved to be highly successful, reaching 12,000 voters in June and 15,000 voters in November. The outreach effort increased Asian American voter turnout by 17%, surpassing previous similar outreach efforts.

In 2008, AJSOCAL also conducted poll monitoring during the February primary and November elections. With the assistance of a hundred volunteers, monitored over 160 poll sites in Los Angeles and Orange Counties. Through their poll monitoring efforts, Advancing Justice - LA and its volunteers enforce the Voting Rights Act, which protects limited English proficient voters at the polls and allows many of them to access translated voting materials or to use interpreters.

=== Affirmative action ===
In Fisher v. University of Texas at Austin, AJSOCAL submitted a brief supporting the University of Texas in preserving the use of affirmative action in admissions, saying Asian students "benefited from exposure to a diverse student body." An opposing brief by the Asian American Legal Foundation supported Fisher, the plaintiff, stated that an effect of affirmative action in admissions by University of Texas was discrimination against Asian students.

== Layoffs and Union Disputes ==
In the fall of 2019, the organization, then known as Asian Americans Advancing Justice - Los Angeles (AAAJ-LA), laid off approximately 20% of its staff amidst ongoing contract negotiations with its newly unionized workforce. This action, which included the termination of several union leaders and negotiations committee members, sparked significant controversy and accusations of anti-union tactics. The layoffs were attributed to a reported $2 million budget shortfall, but critics argued they were strategically timed to weaken the union's bargaining position.

The layoffs also drew concerns about their impact on the organization's ability to serve the community, particularly as they affected multilingual hotline workers who provided critical services to non-English speakers. The incident led to public protests and condemnation from labor organizations. Additionally, three top leaders at AAAJ-LA resigned in protest of the layoffs, citing concerns about the organization's commitment to its mission and staff; the resignations further underscored the tensions and turmoil within the organization following the layoffs.

In response to the layoffs, the Union filed a complaint with the National Labor Relations Board (NLRB), alleging that AAAJ-LA violated labor laws by laying off employees without providing the Union with notice and an opportunity to bargain. The NLRB's Office of the General Counsel investigated the complaint and issued an Advice Memorandum on November 3, 2020, concluding that AAAJ-LA had indeed violated labor laws in certain respects. The memorandum found that AAAJ-LA had a duty to bargain over the decision to lay off employees in several departments and that it failed to provide the Union with adequate notice and an opportunity to bargain over the effects of the layoffs.
