= Curb cut effect =

Effect of assistive technology

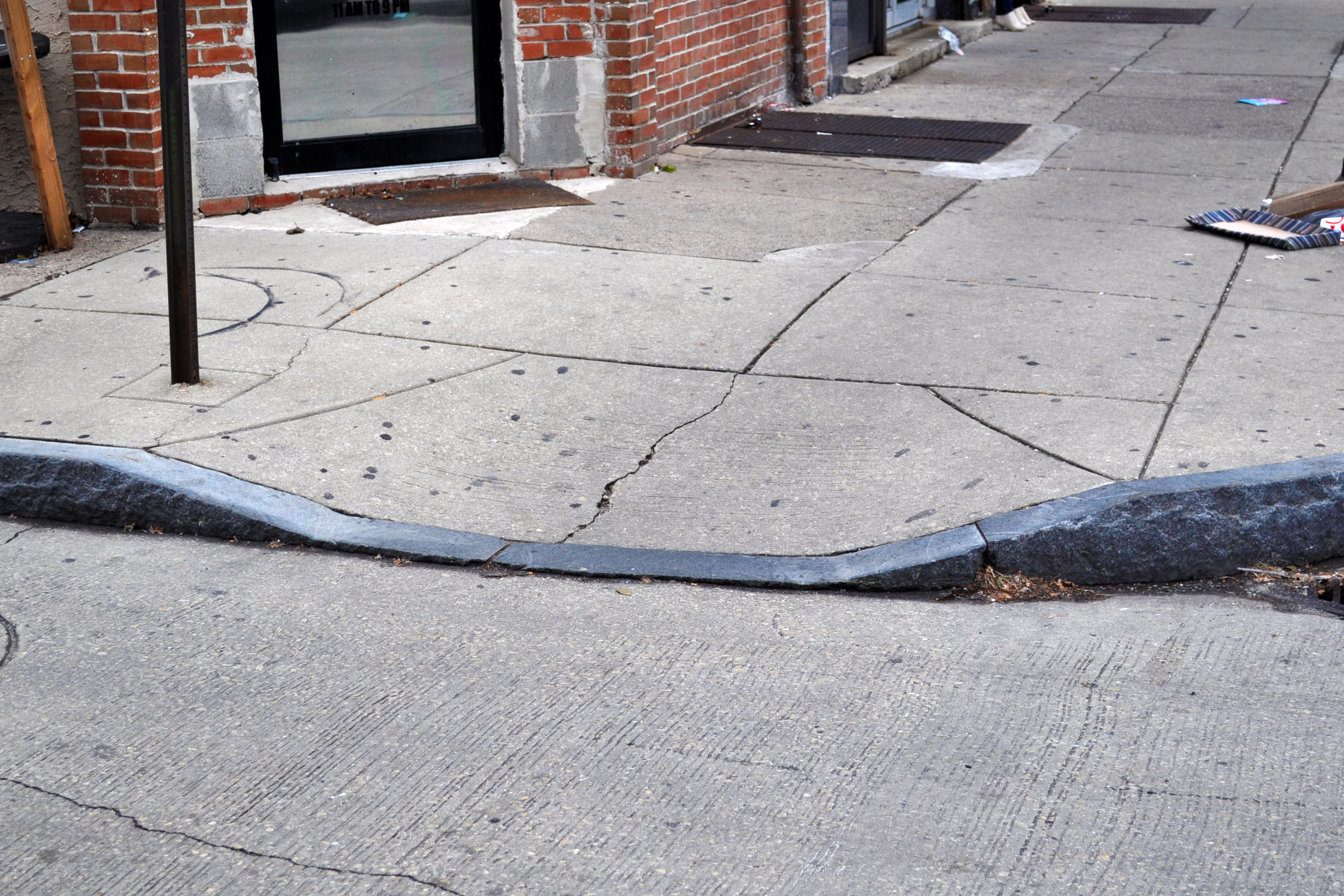
A curb cut

The curb cut effect (Note: sometimes the dropped kerb effect in British English) is the phenomenon of disability-friendly features being used and appreciated by a larger group than the people for whom they were designed. The phenomenon is named for curb cuts – miniature ramps comprising parts of sidewalk – which were first made for wheelchair access in particular places but were also welcomed by people pushing strollers, carts or luggage. Curb cuts are now ubiquitous and no longer widely recognized as a disability-accessibility feature. Another example is people who can hear using television closed captioning.

The curb cut effect is a subset of universal design, which is the purposeful design of an environment so that it is accessible to all people regardless of ability or disability. The curb cut effect differs slightly from universal design, as the curb cut phenomenon is often unintentional rather than purposeful but results in a similar outcome.

== Examples ==
Below are some examples of the curb cut effect.

- Closed captioning used by hearing people.
- Game accessibility features in video games used by players with no disabilities.
- Text-to-speech (TTS) applications are used by people without visual impairment or mutism. TTS can be used to read articles, academic papers, or books out loud, and it's common for users to listen to TTS readings while commuting or multitasking. They can be used as an alternative to a human voiceover or for artistic purposes (see Vocaloid).
- Audible pedestrian crossing signals

== Implications ==
The curb cut effect has become a prominent phenomenon as society more widely implements accessible and inclusive environments. Implications of the curb cut effect include an increased awareness around universal design within the general population. Many features originally designed to reduce barriers for people with disabilities have been utilized and enjoyed by those outside of the initial target population, encouraging universal design. Curb cut effects increase economic benefits from including many accessibility accommodations in a business setting. DEI initiatives such as flexible work hours and working from home have also caused curb cut effects within business settings, as well as in educational settings via testing accommodations and in personal use through noise-cancelling headphones and walk-in showers. However, this results in subordinating disability accessibility to general benefits, leading to the rejection of individualized design for disabled populations.

== See also ==
- Universal design
- Inclusive design
- Angela Glover Blackwell
