= Joan McIntyre (activist) =

American author and anti-whaling activist

- McIntyre c. 1989
- Born: December 19, 1931; Los Angeles, California, U.S.
- Died: June 22, 2016 (aged 84)
- Other name: Joana McIntyre Varawa
- Education: University of California, Berkeley
- Occupations: Anthropologist; Activist
- Years active: 1971–1983
- Notable work: Mind in the Waters (1974); The Delicate Art of Whale Watching (1982); Changes in Latitude (1989)

Joan McIntyre (December 19, 1931 – June 22, 2016), also known as Joana McIntyre Varawa, was an American author and anti-whaling activist. A high-ranking member of Friends of the Earth in the early 1970s, she founded Project Jonah in 1974 to give focus on the specific goal of preventing whaling. After several successful and unsuccessful campaigns, she left the organization in 1983 due to excessive conflicts and politicking and later moved to Fiji.

== Childhood and education ==
McIntyre stated that she was always interested in social issues during her teenage years, joining political school groups to protest matters like the use of the A-bomb. She graduated from the University of California, Berkeley with a degree in anthropology.

== Career ==
Spending several years after graduating as both a producer and occasional commenter for the Pacifica Foundation non-commercial radio stations, McIntyre also joined the Friends of the Earth organization and became heavily involved in their campaigns. This included helping lead the national movement in the US to protest fashion designer usage of real fur clothing. During this time period, she was made special projects coordinator for the group, but felt by 1972 that the amount of projects and large scale issues, such as the Trans-Alaska Pipeline System and the SST Concorde, were too numerous to manage. She was later inspired to a different focus by John C. Lilly's book The Mind of the Dolphin and by the news she received while broadcasting ecology programs on the practices of whale hunting that were occurring. Wanting to express her ideas on how to save the whale, she presented them at the United Nations Conference on the Human Environment and was able to have the chairman change the symbol of the conference to the whale. Her petitions to the United States also resulted in a 10-year moratorium on any commercial whaling in the country.

After attending the 1971 annual meeting of the International Whaling Commission and failing to convince them to advance a similar moratorium in a six to five country vote, she decided to form the organization Project Jonah shortly afterward, leaving Friends of the Earth in order to do so. The early version of the project was largely informational, trying to raise awareness of the impact of whaling and the killing of dolphins and other marine life on large scales around the world. To bolster this awareness, she published the book Mind in the Waters in 1974 that is a collection of different material, including scientific information alongside poetry, mythology, and photographs that discuss the mental capabilities and sentient consciousness of whales and dolphins. By this point, Project Jonah had already expanded to also having a Canadian branch headed by Farley Mowat and McIntyre did a publicity trip there after the book's publication to promote what Canadians can do to help, such as boycotting American yellowfin tuna. She also had the group target the activities of Japan and Russia, who were responsible for about 85% of all annual whale killings worldwide.

By 1983, she had stepped down as president of Project Jonah, having become "fed up" with the politics involved and how much of people's "good intentions usually turn into either stupidity or righteousness". That same year, she published the book The Delicate Art of Whale Watching, which contained her collected musings and observations throughout her life on the nautical events she had participated in.

== Personal life and death ==
During her early career, McIntyre lived in Bolinas, California, and had a son from her first marriage. When she was in her 50s she married Male Varawa, a Fijian fisherman in his 20s whom she met after moving to Fiji. She told the story of her move and marriage in her 1989 book Changes in Latitude: An Uncommon Anthropology. She died in June 2016.

== Books ==
- — (1962). Bodega Bay: The People Vs. the Experts. Sierra Club Books. p. 20.
- — (1974). Mind in the Waters: A Book to Celebrate the Consciousness of Whales and Dolphins. Charles Scribner's Sons. p. 240. ISBN 9780684139951.
- — (1982). The Delicate Art of Whale Watching. Sierra Club Books. p. 144. ISBN 9780871563231.
- — (1989). Changes in Latitude: An Uncommon Anthropology. Harper Perennial. p. 274. ISBN 9780060973193.
- —; et al. (1998). Intimate Nature: The Bond Between Women and Animals. Fawcett. p. 455.
- — (2009). A Mini Guide to Lanaʻi. p. 44.
- —; Escaño-Vasquez, Eliza; Friedman, Bonnie; Pool, Heidi (2013). Maui 2014: With Molokai and Lanai. Fodor's. p. 344. ISBN 9780770432133.
