= Suzanne Adams =

Suzanne Adams may refer to:

- Suzanne Adams (soprano) (1872–1953), American lyric soprano
- Murder of Suzanne Adams, 2025 murder in Greenwich, Connecticut, United States

== See also ==
- Susanna Adams (1768–1770), daughter of John and Abigail Adams
- Susana Adam, Ghanaian politician
