= List of Mills College people =

The following is a partial list of notable Mills College alumnae. It includes alumnae, professors, and others associated with Mills College.

== Alumnae and alumni ==
- Janus Adams - journalist and talk show host
- Laurie Anderson - performance artist and musician
- John Bischoff - musician
- Kevin Blechdom - musician
- Renel Brooks-Moon - voice of the San Francisco Giants, first black baseball announcer
- Trisha Brown - choreographer
- Dave Brubeck - musician and composer
- Teresa Blankmeyer Burke - philosopher and bioethicist
- Alice Sudduth Byerly (1855–1904) - temperance activist
- Peggie Castle - actress
- Sharon Cheslow - musician and artist
- King Lan Chew - dancer
- Amy Hsiao-chang Chiang, socialite
- Maya Chinchilla - poet
- Katherine Choy - ceramicist
- Marika Cifor - professor at University of Washington Information School
- Martha Fuller Clark - New Hampshire state senator
- Sofia Coppola - director
- Elizabeth Crow (1968, B.A.) - editor and journalist
- Eunice Prieto Damron - ceramic artist
- Olivia de Havilland - actress
- Vaughn De Leath
- Paul DeMarinis - artist, musician, composer
- Rosanna Castrillo Diaz - artist
- March Fong Eu - politician
- Claire Falkenstein - sculptor, painter, print-maker and jewelry designer known for her large-scale abstract metal and glass sculptures
- Molissa Fenley - modern dancer
- Jim Ferguson - guitarist and composer
- Guillermo Galindo - composer, sound artist
- Noah Georgeson - musician and producer
- Leah Gerber - professor of Conservation Science at Arizona State University
- Helen Gilbert - artist
- April Catherine Glaspie - diplomat, United States Ambassador to Iraq during the Gulf War
- Ben Goldberg - composer and clarinetist
- Michelle Cruz Gonzalez - musician, author
- Beate Sirota Gordon - contributing author, as staff to Douglas MacArthur, of Japanese Constitution
- Peter Gordon - composer
- Ariel Gore - author
- Guðmundur Steinn Gunnarsson - composer
- Holly Herndon - composer, musician, and sound artist
- Barbara Higbie - musician and composer
- Claire Giannini Hoffman - first woman to serve on the boards of Bank of America and Sears, Roebuck & Company
- Kathy Jetnil-Kijiner - Marshallese poet and climate change activist
- Snatam Kaur - musician and activist
- Bevin Kelley - musician
- Nia King - art activist, multimedia journalist, podcaster, public speaker, and zine maker
- Ron Kuivila - musician and sound artist
- Michael Land - head of LucasArts sound department
- Dorianne Laux - award-winning poet
- Barbara Lee - U.S. representative from California's 12th congressional district
- May Lee - CNN correspondent
- Phil Lesh - Grateful Dead bassist
- Cheena Marie Lo - poet
- Charmian London - second wife and biographer of Jack London
- Jeffrey Luck Lucas - musician and composer
- Megan March - musician, visual artist
- Micheline Aharonian Marcom - novelist
- Jerry Martin - composer
- Miya Masaoka - musician and composer
- Billie June McCaskill - botanist
- Siobhon McManus - teacher and activist
- Stacey Milbern - disability rights activist
- Constance Money - actress
- Elizabeth Murray - painter and MacArthur Fellow
- Emma Kaili Metcalf Beckley Nakuina - writer
- Dasha Nekrasova - actress
- Amy X. Neuburg - musician and composer
- Joanna Newsom - musician
- Margaret Nielsen - New Zealand pianist and piano teacher
- Margaret Saunders Ott - pianist and music educator
- Diana L. Paxson - author
- Maggi Payne - composer and musician
- Daniella Pineda
- Dan Plonsey - saxophonist
- Johanna Poethig – visual, public and performance artist
- Dixy Lee Ray - governor of Washington and chair of the U.S. Atomic Energy Commission
- Dana Reason - composer and musician
- Steve Reich - composer
- Marc Anthony Richardson - novelist
- Gino Robair - composer and percussionist
- Manuel Rocha Iturbide - composer and sound artist
- Ana Roxanne - musician and singer
- Ananya Roy - professor of urban studies at UC Berkeley
- Ann Sandifur - composer
- Mia Satya (aka Mia Tu Mutch) - community organizer and activist
- Lateefah Simon - U.S. representative from California's 12th congressional district
- Beate Sirota - helped write the Japanese constitution
- Irma Tam Soong - historian
- Morton Subotnick - composer
- Michèle Taylor - U.S. ambassador to the UN Human Rights Council
- Grace Vamos - composer and cellist
- Dana Vespoli - pornographic actress
- Candace Vogler - philosopher
- Katharine Mulky Warne - composer
- Gordon Watson - pianist
- William Winant - percussionist
- Betty Ann Wong - composer
- Hsiung-Zee Wong - composer and musician
- Jade Snow Wong - author and artist
- Connie Young Yu - author, historian, and lecturer

== Faculty ==
- Robert Ashley
- Fred Uhl Ball
- Mary Lathrop Benton
- Arthur Berger
- Luciano Berio
- John Bischoff
- Chana Bloch
- Lenore Blum
- Anthony Braxton
- Domenico Brescia
- Anna Cox Brinton
- Chris Brown
- Dave Brubeck
- John Cage
- Alvin Curran
- Delaine Eastin
- Hettie Belle Ege
- Fred Frith
- Lou Harrison
- Joan Jeanrenaud
- Barbara Lee - congresswoman
- George E. Lewis
- Yiyun Li
- Hung Liu
- Ajuan Mance
- Helene Mayer (1910–1953) - German and American Olympic champion fencer
- Darius Milhaud
- Roscoe Mitchell
- Diana O'Hehir
- Pauline Oliveros
- Kathleen Parlow
- Roi Partridge
- Maggi Payne
- Elizabeth Marie Pope
- Stephen Ratcliffe
- Terry Riley
- David Rosenboom
- Moira Roth
- Dean Rusk
- Diana E.H. Russell
- Pierre Salinger
- Kirsten Saxton
- Robert Sheff
- Laetitia Sonami
- Glenn Spearman
- Ellen Spertus
- Homer Sprague
- Zvezdelina Stankova
- Susan Stryker
- Morton Subotnick
- Grace Vamos
- Catherine Wagner
- Edith Wherry
- William Winant

== Trustees ==
- Albert M. Bender
- Ethel Moore (1872–1920) - trustee, elected in 1915
- Milton H. Myrick - founding trustee, 1875
