= Anuradha Vikram =

Anuradha Vikram is an art critic, curator, author, and lecturer based in Los Angeles, California. She is the artistic director of 18th Street Arts Center, Santa Monica, and a senior lecturer at Otis College of Art and Design, Los Angeles. She has contributed to numerous publications, and has a published book called Decolonizing Culture: Essays on the Intersection of Art and Politics.

== Early life and education ==
Growing up in Westchester County, New York, Anuradha Vikram began being involved in making art during high school. In 1997 she completed a B.S. Studio Art, minor in Art History, at New York University. She went on in 1999 until 2002, to manage the studios for artists Claes Oldenburg and Coosje van Bruggen. She moved to California, working at Nikolas Weinstein's glass studio in the San Francisco Bay Area. She went to graduate school, completing an M.A. in Curatorial Practice at the California College of the Arts, San Francisco in 2005. Vikram has worked at the Richmond Art Center in Richmond, California, as well as the UC Berkeley Art Department.

== Career ==
In 2012, she curated Spaces of Life: The Art of Sonya Rapoport which focused on Rapoport's interactive work from 1979-2011 at Mills College Art Museum. Later in 2013 Vikram curated Social Fabric at the Craft and Folk Art Museum in Los Angeles. She also curated the show Uncommon Terrain for Shulamit Nazarian Gallery in 2015. She has organized over fifty exhibitions over the last decade.

In 2017, she published her first book Decolonizing Culture with Art Practical and Sming Sming Books. Decolonizing Culture book focuses on the intersection of art and politics in contemporary art.

Vikram actively contributes to critical art magazines, such as Hyperallergic, Art Practical and the San Francisco's Museum of Modern Art (SFMoMA) blog.

== Notable concepts ==
A notable concept of Vikram's curatorial practice is creating connections between people. She works to extend beyond artwork that is solely in dialogue with European/American standards of what art is. Her work concerns ideas of gender, representation, cultural appropriation, diversity, race, and culture. She aims to find the intersection between the contemporary art world and politics, writing to acknowledge the imbalance in treatment in the art world between artists of color and white artists. Through her work, Vikram shows that while contemporary art has been a space for strong social justice outlooks, it does not quite get to a non-imperialist approach to curating work. In interviews she has spoken about sexism in art through a discussion of Carolee Schneeman. She has also spoken about racial disparity in the contemporary art world through a discussion of Isaac Julien.

== Select work and exhibitions ==
Vikram has one published book, Decolonizing Culture: Essays on the Intersection of Art and Politics. It was published in 2017 by Art Practical and Sming Sming Books. It is a collection of 17 of her essays, focusing on inclusion, diversity, and the lack thereof, in contemporary art.

She is also a contributor to X-TRA, KCET Artbound and DAILY SERVING, and has been published in Hyperallergic, Leonardo, SF Camerawork Journal, Afterimage, Artillery, The Brooklyn Rail, and Open Space, the blog of the San Francisco Museum of Modern Art.

Some of her other recent publications include "'Naked in the Sight of the Object': Masking, Masquerade, and Black Identity" (X-TRA, vol. 18 no. 4, Summer 2016), "Becoming Human: Nam June Paik's Futuristic Compassion" (X-TRA, vol. 18 no. 1, Fall 2015), "A Brief and Incomplete History of Art and Technology Ventures in the Bay Area 1980-2010" (Afterimage, vol. 41, no. 6, Summer 2014), and "Sonya Rapoport: A Woman's Place is in the Studio" (Sonya Rapoport: Pairings of Polarities. Terri Cohn, Ed. Berkeley: Heyday, 2012).

Exhibitions
Name of show	Dates	Location	Notable themes and notes
Uncommon Terrain	July 29–August 28, 2015	Shulamit Nazarian, Venice, California	Explores place and how histories are transcended through personal experience and embodiment.
Social Fabric	January 26–May 5, 2013	Craft and Folk Art Museum, Los Angeles, California	Explores the influence of craft and fabric on the artist, and how it has influenced global commerce, power, and labor.
Spaces of Life: The Art of Sonya Rapport	January 18–March 11, 2012	Mills College Art Museum, Oakland, California	Surveys 35 years of Sonya Rapport's art. Rapport is a conceptual artist who uses her artwork to better understand herself and create connections between others.
In Mind and Memory	September 28–October 22	Worth Ryder Art Gallery, University of California, Berkeley, California	Responses to being marginalized in a globally-connected world.
Dislocated	February 16–March 5, 2011	Worth Ryder Art Gallery, University of California, Berkeley, California	"Explores the conflict between where we live out our lives by necessity and where we are located politically."
Knowledge Hacking	September 15–October 9, 2010	Worth Ryder Art Gallery, University of California, Berkeley, California	Explores how scientists and artists share their knowledge.
Domestic Disturbance	October 7–31, 2009	Worth Ryder Art Gallery, University of California, Berkeley, California	Explores the difficulties of balancing public and private life.
East of the West	May 1–24, 2008	SomArts Gallery, San Francisco, California	Explores a different perspective on the Middle East and promoting more diverse artwork by artists from this region.
Beyond Explanation	September 5–October 13, 2006	National Institute of Art and Disabilities (NIAD), Richmond, California	A visual dialogue creating a connection between NIAD artists and visiting artists.
