= Irma Tam Soong =

Historian of Chinese in Hawaii (1912–2001)

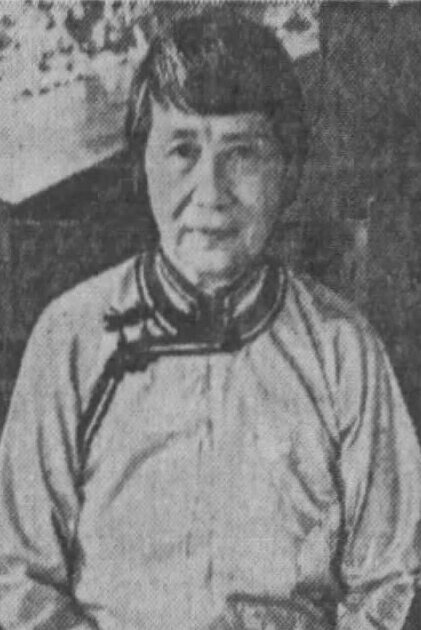
- Soong in 1976
- Born: Irma Tam; July 15, 1912; Honolulu, Territory of Hawaii
- Died: January 11, 2001 (aged 88); Honolulu, Hawaii, United States
- Other names: Irma Soong 宋譚秀紅
- Education: Mills College; Yenching University; University of Hawaii
- Occupations: Historian; writer
- Organization: Hawaii Chinese History Center
- Notable work: "The Christian Schooling of Sun Yat-sen"; Chinese-American Refugee: A World War II Memoir

Irma Tam Soong (July 15, 1912 – January 11, 2001) was a historian, writer, and educator specializing in the history of the Chinese in Hawaii. She was the founder and executive director of the Hawaii Chinese History Center, established in 1971, and was the author of Chinese-American Refugee (1984), her memoir about her experiences in China during World War II. A distant relative of Chinese leader Sun Yat-sen, her most widely cited work was a 1997 article in The Hawaiian Journal of History about his education at Christian schools in Hawaiʻi. Her extensive teaching experience included stints at two schools in China; she was an instructor in Chinese language and literature at Pomona College in California in the early 1950s, and was an English teacher at Kaimuki High School in Honolulu until 1970.

In 1975, Soong received an American Association for State and Local History award of merit "for her contribution to the preservation of Chinese culture and history in Hawaii". In 1984, she was named a "Hawaii Chinese Living Treasure" by the Chinese Youths of Hawaii.

== Early life and education ==
She was born Irma Tam in Honolulu in the Territory of Hawaii in 1912. Her father, Thomas A. Tam, was the proprietor of a store, Yee Sing Nam Kee, in Chinatown; he had graduated from Oahu College with the help of American missionaries. Her mother was originally from Kwangtung, China, and had come to Hawaii in 1911 to marry her father; her maiden name was Sun, and she was a distant relative of Sun Yat-sen. Growing up, Irma learned Cantonese from her parents, and studied Chinese from the age of seven. She had many siblings and lived with her family in Kaimuki. Her paternal grandparents lived above her father's store.

She attended the University of Hawaiʻi for two years, and completed a bachelor's degree at Yenching University in Beijing. She later earned a master's degree in English literature at Mills College in Oakland, California.

She married Norman Soong, a photojournalist and war correspondent for Chiang Kai-shek's Central News Agency, who was also a graduate of Yenching Uninversity. At the time of the Japanese attack on Hong Kong, her husband fled the city, leaving Irma with their nine-month-old son. She decided to seek refuge with her husband's family and made her way to their village via boat, cattle train, and by foot. They eventually moved to the war-time capital of Nationalist China, Chongqing, where they remained for two years. She returned to Los Angeles after traveling by plane over the "hump" to India.

== Career ==
Soong taught English at two schools in China, including Hwa Nan College in Fuzhou from 1935 to 1936. She then worked in Hong Kong on the editorial staffs of China Fortnightly Magazine and the Central News Agency. After returning to California, she continued to work as a Chinese news correspondent. She was a popular public speaker on China-related topics.

=== Teaching in the United States ===
From 1950 to 1953, Soong served as a faculty member at Pomona College in Claremont, California, where she taught Chinese language and literature as part of the Oriental affairs department. She also led the Claremont Graduate School orientation program for Fulbright scholars.

Soong then returned to Hawaii, where she taught English at Kaimuki High School. In 1965, she was one of 70 public high school teachers nationally to be awarded a John Hay Fellowship in the Humanities.

=== Hawaii Chinese History Center ===
In 1970, Soong retired from teaching, and helped to establish the Hawaii Chinese History Center (HCHC), which was incorporated in 1971. Soong was named executive secretary, and went on to serve as its executive director for many years. She worked with Tin-Yuke Char and Wai Jane Char to recruit others interested in the history of Chinese in Hawaii. By 1978, the HCHC had 600 members, 10 volunteers, one full-time employee, and two part-time staff; however, it developed a reputation as "largely the one-woman operation of Irma Soong".

During the 1970s, Soong also led several HCHC field trips to visit historical sites and spearheaded a program for Chinese speakers to tape record oral history interviews with the elderly. In 1974, the center created a traveling photographic exhibition, "The Chinese in Hawaii", which was shown in Honolulu City Hall. That year, HCHC was officially commended by the State House of Representatives not only for researching and documenting the history of the Chinese community in Hawaii, but also for stimulating interest in preserving ethnic history in the state more broadly.

In 1975, the HCHC co-sponsored a photo exhibit, "Sun Yat-sen and the Chinese revolution", together with Iolani School and the Consulate General of the Republic of China. That year, Soong received an award of merit from the American Association for State and Local History for her work in preserving the history and culture of the Chinese community in Hawaii.

Under Soong's leadership, the HCHC maintained a library of historical records of families, village societies, and Buddhist temples to aid people with genealogical research. As of 1990, Soong was executive director emeritus of HCHC.

== Research and writing ==
Soong spent many years writing about her experiences during World War II in China during the Japanese occupation. Her book, Chinese-American Refugee: A World War II Memoir, was published in 1984. Her book included a few pages on what life was like for a Chinese refugee in the United States in the 1940s.

Soong wrote "Sun Yat-sen's Christian Schooling in Hawaiʻi" (1997) published in The Hawaiian Journal of History about Sun Yat-sen's four years as a sojourner in Hawaiʻi from 1879 to 1883 and his attendance at at least two Christian educational institutions – and a possible third. Although records for the St. Louis school for this period are unavailable, Soong speculated that he may have attended the Catholic school as well. Soong further argued that Chinese Christians in Hawaiʻi were influential, although they were few in number, in the late 19th century.

Five Hsing Chung Hui Men of Valor, which Soong co-authored with Wei-tun Lin, is a history of the revolutionary society founded in Hawaiʻi by Sun. The book was published as part of the 200th anniversary commemoration of the arrival of Chinese in Hawaiʻi.

Soong wrote the foreword of Tin-Yuke Char's autobiographical The Bamboo Path. She also contributed to The Lives of Kauai's Chinese (1980), compiled and edited by Tin-Yuke and Wai Jane Char.

== Personal life and death ==
Her husband, Norman Soong, served as managing editor of the Pan Asia News Alliance. For a time, he worked in Tokyo while Irma remained in California. They later divorced.

Their son, Colin S. Y. Soong, graduated from Punahou School in Honolulu in 1959, and from the University of Hawaii in 1963. He received a doctor of medicine degree from the University of Colorado at Boulder, and went on to work as a physician in Carson City, Nevada.

Soong died in January 2001 at the age of 88 of a pulmonary illness. At the time of her death she had two grandchildren.

== Selected works ==
- "Sun Yat-sen's Christian Schooling in Hawaii" (1997)
- Chinese-American Refugee: A World War II Memoir (1984), with Wei-tun Lin
- Five Hsing Chung Hui Men of Valor (1989)
- "Chinese Leaders of the Hsing Chung Hui" (1991)
- "East Maui Chinese History" (1973)
- "The History of the Hawaii Chinese History Center" (1980)
- "Chinatown Yesterday: A Personal Glimpse" (1980)
- "A Study of the Meeting Records of the Ket Hing Society, Kula, Maui, 1913–1947" (1979), with Ted T. K. Gong
- "The Eight Immortals" (1983)
