= Mills College Art Museum =

Museum and art gallery in Oakland, California

Coordinates: 37.7833°N 122.1819°W

Mills College Art Museum (MCAM) is a museum and art gallery in Oakland, California. The museum hosts contemporary work and exhibitions year-round by nationally and internationally known artists, as well as student thesis exhibitions.

== History ==
Before the founding of Mills College Art Museum in 1825, Mills College had already begun to acquire an art collection. The founders of Mills College, Susan and Cyrus Mills, were profoundly fond of art and history. Susan's sister Jane Tolman, an art historian at the College, developed an art history curriculum in 1875. By the 1880s, Mills College had amassed 1,000 works of art and reproductions.

Thanks to a bequest from Susan Tolman Mills in 1912, as well as additional gifts, the museum building was constructed in 1925 and opened the same year, as the Mills College Art Gallery. Albert M. Bender, the Mills College Trustee chiefly responsible for the museum's completion, made a gift of 40 paintings and 75 prints by contemporary San Francisco Bay Area artists. Bender's gift became the first public collection of modern art in Northern California. Bender later became a principal founder of what is now the San Francisco Museum of Modern Art. The museum’s collection has grown to over 8,000 objects, building on its strengths in prints and drawings, photography, California paintings, and textiles. In

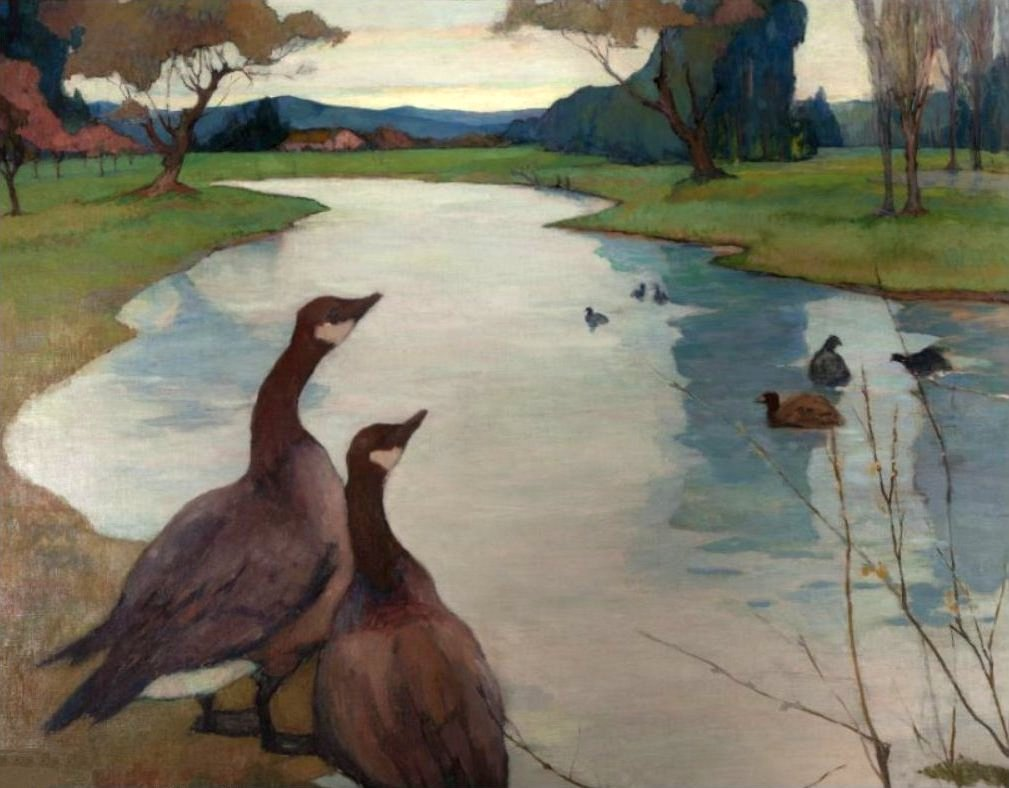
Wild Geese, by Rowena Meeks Abdy

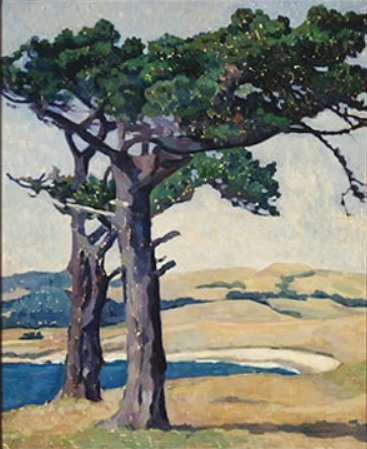
Carmel, by Anne Bremer

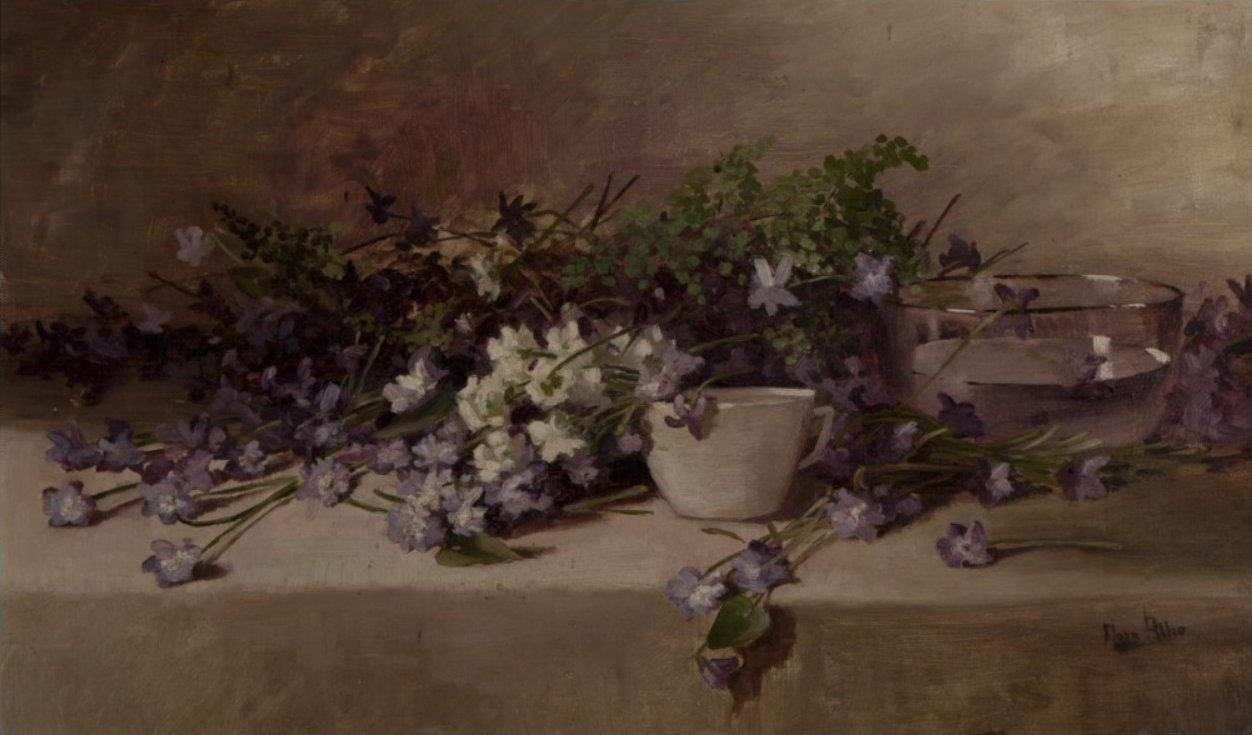
Still Life, by Nora Allis Schmalhorst

== Building ==
The Mills College Art Museum building was designed by California architect Walter Ratcliff, Jr., who served as campus architect from 1923 to 1947 and designed several other structures at Mills College. The design combines Beaux-Arts and Spanish Colonial Revival architectural styles. The large open space with a high, ornate ceiling originally functioned as both a ballroom and an art gallery. Currently the museum houses 6,000 square feet of gallery space.
