= Fred Ball (disambiguation) =

Fred Ball (1915–2007) was an American movie executive.

Fred Ball may also refer to:

- Fred Ball (footballer) (1868–1902), Australian rules footballer
- Fred Uhl Ball (1945–1985), American enamellist
- Fred Ball (producer) (born 1977), Norwegian record producer
