= Rowena Meeks Abdy =

American modernist painter (1887–1945)

- Born: April 24, 1887; Vienna, Austria
- Died: August 18, 1945 (aged 58); San Francisco, California
- Education: Mark Hopkins Institute of Art
- Known for: Painting
- Patrons: Albert M. Bender

Rowena Fischer Meeks Abdy (April 24, 1887 – August 18, 1945) was an American modernist painter. She primarily painted landscapes and worked in Northern California.

== Early life and education ==
She was born in Vienna, Austria, in 1887 to American parents, John and Anna Meeks, who compensated for Rowena's deformed leg by encouraging her natural talent in art. After prolonged stays in Vienna, Dresden, Paris, and London the family moved to San Francisco, California, in the 1890s.

For the academic year 1904-05 Abdy studied under the tonalist painters Arthur Frank Mathews, Charles C. Judson, and Will Sparks at the California School of Design in the Mark Hopkins Institute of Art, where she was awarded an honorable mention for drawing. Her street scenes and landscapes in oils, watercolors and mixed-media drawings appeared in over fifty exhibitions throughout California from 1908 to the mid-1940s.

== Mid life and career ==
Rowena Meeks Abdy's significance as a California painter cannot be over-rated. Her work...is familiar to and well loved by thousands of people all over the United States.

— Grace Hubbard

Abdy was considered a historian on early California, which she often displayed in her artwork. She primarily painted landscapes, with a focus on the landscapes of Northern California, including coastal towns, Spanish missions, and the scenery of San Francisco. Abdy would travel from her home in Russian Hill to paint mining towns and the Sierra Nevada. Her main studio was located in her Russian Hill home, which was located on what would eventually become the crooked part of Lombard Street. She bought the property in 1921. Abdy had a large "KEEP OUT" sign on her garden, which was frequented by uninvited curious tourists. From her studio, Abdy could see Marin County, Contra Costa County and the San Francisco Bay.

Abdy believed that abstract art should be used beyond paintings, and into the home through decorative arts. She painted "what she feels about what she sees."

=== 1910s ===
She married writer Harry Bennett Abdy. He would promote Abdy's work using his writing skills. In 1915, couple took a steamboat trip from St. Louis, Missouri to Pittsburgh, Pennsylvania. They met artist Armin Hansen, who would make drawings that would eventually be used to create by Abdy. The Abdy's finished their trip in New York City, where Abdy exhibited work created during the trip. Harry wrote a book on the trip, On the Ohio, which featured illustrations by Abdy. When they got back to California, Abdy built a home on the Monterey Peninsula. She called her studio and home, Forest Haven. It was there where she would main many Spanish missions and coastal landscapes. She then moved, in 1917, to San Diego, California. In San Diego, she painted landscapes of Old Town. In 1919, she was represented by Helgesen Galleries in San Francisco. The gallery showed her watercolors, charcoal drawings, and landscapes of Mission San Juan Bautista.

=== 1920s ===
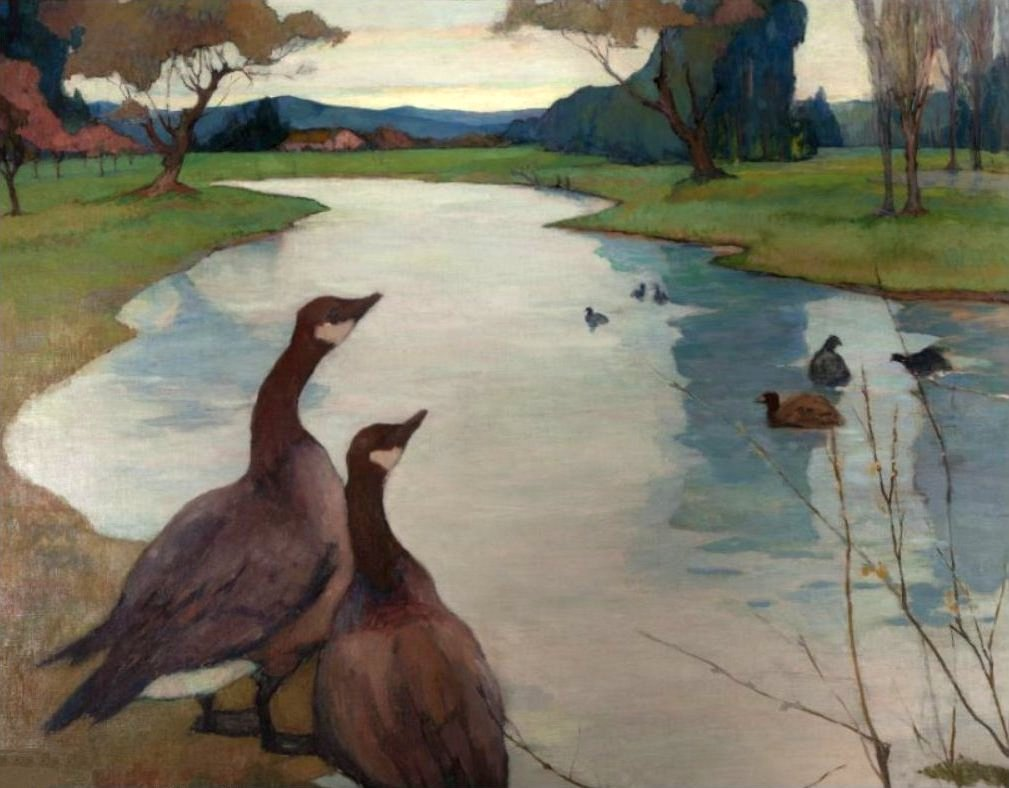
Decoration: Wild Geese by Rowena Meeks Abdy, c. 1925

During this period, she took road trips, in her sedan. Her sedan was equipped with special storage spaces for her art supplies. The work from this road trip period would be published in a coffee table book called Old California. The book consisted primarily of watercolors. It was printed by John Henry Nash and it was dedicated to Henry E. Huntington. Gottardo Piazzoni wrote the foreword. The book was limited edition, only 400 copies were made, and copies today are collector's items. Some plates from the book were utilized by the University of California alumni magazine and Standard Oil Monthly.

She lived and worked briefly on Montgomery Street, before moving into her Lombard Street home in 1921. In the mid-1920s she started painting still lifes and flowers. In 1926, she exhibited her painting, Old Spanish Street, Monterey, at the California Palace of the Legion of Honor. It was the first time American artists exhibited at the museum. That same year, Abdy became a founding member of the cooperative art space, Club Beaux Arts, in San Francisco. She had a solo show there that November, followed by multiple solo and group exhibitions at the space throughout the rest of the decade. During the decade, Abdy and Harry divorced.

In 1927, Abdy created a painting of the Greene and Greene, D. L. James House, once owned by the writer Daniel Lewis James. The painting shows the sandstone and granite Mediterranean-style house on a bluff in Carmel Highlands, California overlooking the water.

=== 1930s and 1940s ===
In the early 1930s, Abdy stopped using white paint in her watercolors, which she exhibited in March 1931 in San Francisco. When her drawings and paintings from California and Italy were given a solo exhibition at the Palace of the Legion of Honor in March 1932, the opinions of critics were divided between H.L. Dungan, who praised her "clean colors and entertaining imagination," and Junius Cravens, who found her compositions "weak in that they lack unity and logic." Abdy joined and exhibited with the Carmel Art Association between 1934 and 1942. She contributed to the art display at the Golden Gate International Exposition on Treasure Island in 1936. Due to declining health she preferred to spend the winters in the desert. Her exhibition of Death Valley scenes at the Legion of Honor in 1942 was praised for its simple and totally un-sensational manner.

== Later life and legacy ==
She lived in San Francisco until she died in August, 1945. Ephemera related to her life and work are held in the collection of the Smithsonian American Art Museum.

== Major collections ==
- Ravello, date unknown, Seattle Art Museum, Seattle, Washington
- View of an Italian Hill Town, ca. 1920, Mills College Art Museum, Oakland, California
- Decoration: Wild Geese, ca. 1925, Mills College Art Museum, Oakland, California
- The Robert Louis Stevenson House in Monterey, 1928, California Palace of the Legion of Honor, San Francisco, California
