= Antonio Prieto (artist) =

American ceramic artist and art professor (1912–1967)

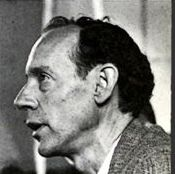
- Prieto in 1959
- Born: 1912
- Died: March 11, 1967 (aged 54–55); Oakland, California, US
- Education: Alfred University
- Spouse: Eunice Prieto Damron

Antonio Prieto (1912 – March 11, 1967) was an American ceramic artist and art professor at Mills College in Oakland, California. He was instrumental in developing an important ceramics collection for the Mills College Art Museum. He was born in Yaldepenas, Spain on August 23, 1912, and died in Oakland on March 11, 1967.

== History ==
Prieto immigrated to the United States as a child in 1916. After studying at Alfred University from 1943 to 1946, he chaired the Ceramics Program and taught at California College of Arts and Crafts in Oakland (now California College of the Arts) from 1946 to 1950. At the time, F. Carlton Ball was teaching ceramics at Mills College. When Ball left Mills, Prieto succeeded him.

While teaching at Mills College from 1950 to 1967, Prieto compiled a personal collection of ceramic art, including works by Robert Arneson, Viola Frey, Henry Varnum Poor, Peter Voulkos, and Marguerite Wildenhain. After Prieto's death, artists contributed more works to a memorial collection, bringing the total to over 400 works. In 1970, the Prieto family donated the collection to the college. An Antonio Prieto Gallery was created adjacent to the Tea Shop at Mills, and the collection was exhibited there for several years.

In 2004, Prieto sons, Esteban, Mark, Peter, and Paco Prieto, and his widow Eunice Damron donated his papers to the Archives of American Art as part of the Nanette L. Laitman Documentation Project for Craft and Decorative Arts in America.

Robert Arneson studied with Prieto and mentioned him numerous times in his oral history interview in the Archives of American Art.
