= Eunice Prieto Damron =

American ceramic artist (1924–2015)

Eunice Prieto Damron (née Adams; 1924–2015) was an American ceramic artist who taught at Mills College in Oakland, California. Her work was typically utilitarian, but she also worked in other mediums, such as painting and enameling. Collections of her work can be found at the Oakland Museum of Art and at Mills College, both located in Oakland. Damron was married to artist Antonio Prieto, who she meet when the two were studying at Alfred University. Prieto Damron donated her husband's papers to the Archives of American Art in 2004.
