= Benicia Seminary =

Benicia Seminary site Young Ladies' Seminary of Benicia
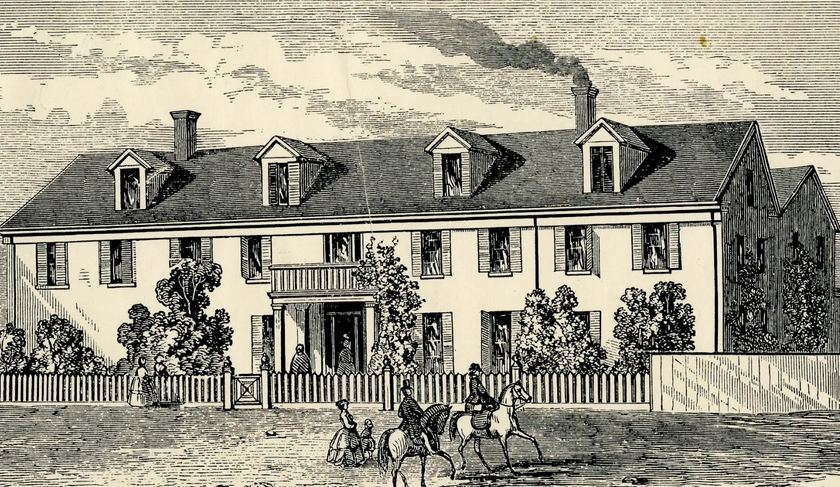
- Benicia Seminary

- Location within California Location within the United States
- 38.0538°N 122.156°W
- Location: 110 West J Street, Benicia, California

History
- Built: 1852
- Built for: Young Ladies' Seminary of Beniciain

California Historical Landmark
- Designated: September 6, 1964
- Reference no.: 795

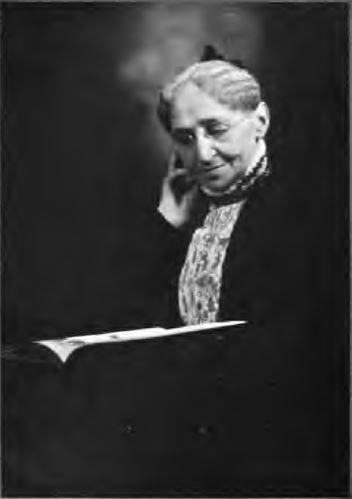
Susan Tolman Mills, founding member of Mills College and Community Congregational Church in Benicia

Benicia Seminary was founded by a Board of Trustees in June 1852, as the Young Ladies' Seminary of Benicia in Solano County, California, in the city of Benicia, California. The Benicia Seminary site is a California Historical Landmark No. 795 listed on September 6, 1964. At its peak, the Young Ladies' Seminary of Benicia had 149 students from all over Northern California. Young Ladies' Seminary of Benicia was the Protestant Christian Junior college of its day. This was the first of this type of school in California. Mrs. S. A. Lord was the first School Principal in 1852, in 1853 Miss J. M. Hudson became Principal. In 1854, Atkins purchased the school. The Young Ladies' Seminary of Beniciain was sold to Cyrus Mills and Susan Mills in 1865 for $5,000, by Mary Atkins. Thus Benicia Seminary became Mills College. Mills College moved to Oakland, California in July 1871 by train, students, teacher and supplies. Mills College is still a private college. Mills College was granted a charter as a college by the State of california in 1885. Mary Atkins Lynch was born July 7, 1819, in Jefferson, Ohio. Mary Atkins married John Lynch (1824–1900) in 1869. Mary Lynch died September 14, 1882, at aged 63 in Benicia, California. Mary Lynch is buried at Benicia City Cemetery.

After the Mills College moved to Oakland, Mills sold the Benicia Seminary building to Rev. Chas. H. Pope. Pope was the pastor of First Congregational Church, now Community Congregational Church. The Rev. and Mrs. C.T. Mills were founding members of Community Congregational Church. Pope improved the building and continued the Young Ladies' Seminary at the site, becoming the Principal. In 1873, Miss Mary Snell became the manager of the school, running it with her sister. In October, 1871, had a re-union meeting for all of graduates and honored Mary Atkins-Lynch and her husband, the Honorable John Lynch, at the time a US Surveyor general for the State of Louisiana. John Lynch was also the Louisiana Centennial Commissioner. The Lynchs later moved to back to California. In June 1877, the Young Ladies' Seminary celebrated held its 25th anniversary.

A historical marker is at the site of the former Benicia Seminary on 110 West J Street, Benicia, California. The marker was placed there by Benicia Old Timers Committee in 1937.

== Community Congregational Church ==
Community Congregational Church founded as First Congregational Church of Benicia has had a long connection with not only Young Ladies' Seminary of Benicia, but with other schools.

The Church's pastor from 1880 to 1889, Rev. Dr. Samuel Hopkins Willey (1821–1914), was one of the founders and Vice President (1862 to 1869), of the College of California now the University of California. At age 24, Willey graduated from Dartmouth College. Willey started as California pioneer Presbyterian pastor. Before coming to Benicia he was pastor at a Presbyterian Church in New Hampshire, Chaplain of the 1849 California constitutional convention, Presbyterian San Francisco Church (Howard Presbyterian), a Monterey Presbyterian Church, Monterey Congregational Church (and first public library in Monteray), and Santa Cruz Congregational Church. At College of California, he founded The Pacific 55, the first religious paper on the west coast. Willey married Martha N Jeffers Willey (1822–1906) from New Jersey, they had five children.

The Church's pastor from 1896 to 1898, Rev. Samuel Weyler (1863–1898) was the founded of The Classical Academy, that became Benicia High School, in the church's Social Hall. Rev. Samuel Weyler was a Russian Orthodox Jew, born Russia on July 3, 1863. Weyler was working at a store in Kischineff, in southern Russia and became friends with Pastor Faltin, a Russian Orthodox priest and became a Christian. Weyler moved to Wurtemberg, Germany and then to the United States though Ellis Island on July 13, 1882. He attended Protestant churches and became Protestant Messianic Jew, as he found no antisemitic feelings there. He worked as a salesman and then attended Chicago Theological Seminary then Knox College in Galesburg, Illinois in 1885. Next he attended Yale Theological Seminary. Weyler became a missionary at Pueblo, Colorado and a pastor of Congregational Church in Denver on March 1, 1892. Weyler started a church in Buffalo, Wyoming, the Union Congregational Church on March 1, 1893. Weyler became pastor of First Congregational Church in 1896 and died on February 8, 1898, at the age of 35. T

The First Congregational Church of Benicia was founded in October 1865 by Rev. Justin P. Moore. Moore was sent Benicia by the Congregational Home Missionary Society. First Congregational Church of Benicia, not having a building yet, Moore held Sunday Worship Service in Benicia's Sages Hall (Rueger's Hall), above a town saloon. The First Congregational Church of Benicia chartered on June 5, 1866, after the seventeen members votes on the Articles of Faith and Covenant. The church building was completed on December 10, 1868, at debt free cost $6,800 at 35 West J. Street, Benicia, as city historical building. A large church building complex was planned starting in 1956, under Rev. Charles Huddleston. On October 7, 1962, Rev. A.S. Phillps dedicated the new buildings at 1305 West Second Street, Benicia. In January 1961, First Congregational Church of Benicia changed it name to Community Congregational Church.

== See also ==
- California Historical Landmarks in Solano County
- First Presbyterian Church of Benicia
