= First Presbyterian Church of Benicia =

Historical place in Solano County, United States

First Presbyterian Church of Benicia site
- Reverend Sylvester Woodbridge, Jr. founder of First Presbyterian Church of Benicia

- Location within California Location within the United States
- 38.0535°N 122.157°W
- Location: Benicia, California

History
- Built: 1849

California Historical Landmark
- Designated: March 6, 1935
- Reference no.: 175

First Presbyterian Church of Benicia was founded on April 15, 1849, at a building in Benicia, California in Solano County, California. The Presbyterian Church of Benicia site is a California Historical Landmark No. 175 listed on March 6, 1935. The First Presbyterian Church of Benicia was the first Protestant church founded in California with a staff pastor. The pastor was Reverend Sylvester Woodbridge Jr., who founded the church in 1849 using a school house. Woodbridge came to California in 1848. First Presbyterian Church built a building that was dedicated on March 9, 1851. Woodbridge was the pastor till 1869, when he moved to San Francisco. The Presbyterian California Gold Rush church ended in 1875. The Church became a One-room school and most of the members moved to the First Congregational Church of Benicia founded in 1865. Later the church-school building became an Episcopal Church. The Episcopal Church soon built a larger church. The 1851 church was remove and the land became Benicia City Park.

A historical marker is at the site of the former First Presbyterian Church of Benicia in is Benicia City Park, on K Street. The marker was placed there by The Historic Landmarks Committee Grand Parlor Native Sons and Benicia Parlor No.89 and Benicia Parlor No.287 Native Sons of the Golden West and Native Daughters of the Golden West in 1932.

Reverend Sylvester Woodbridge Jr. was born on June 15, 1813, in Sharon, Connecticut. Woodbridge graduated from Union College in 1830 and Princeton Theological Seminary in 1846. Woodbridge married Mary Foster in 1836, they had 11 children: 11. They came to San Francisco in February 1849 sailing from New York on the SS California. Captain Montgomery of the ship SS Portsmouth docked in San Francisco helped Woodbridge in putting on Church Worship Services. By April 15, 1849, there were enough regular attendees to establish The First Presbyterian Church of Benicia. The church was small so, Woodbridge was school teacher Monday to Friday, for a living in the early days of the Church. For the first year he also lived in the church building. He as the pastor of First Presbyterian Church of Benicia for 18 years. Woodbridge died in 1883, at the age of 70.

== See also ==
- California Historical Landmarks in Solano County
