= The Black Woman is God =

American art exhibition series

The Black Woman Is God is a recurring group exhibition of Black women artists curated by Karen Seneferu and Melorra Green, which started in 2013 and in 2016 and 2017 has been located at the San Francisco city-owned nonprofit art space SOMArts. The exhibitions challenge a popular western mindset of God as a white male and instead explores new images showing "The Black Woman is God".

== History ==
=== 2013 Exhibition at the African American Art & Culture Complex ===
The first iteration of The Black Woman is God was intended as a solo exhibition for Seneferu, curated by Green, at the African American Art & Culture Complex. Seneferu agreed to participate in the exhibition only if other black female artists were included. The exhibition included 20 visual and performance artists. The opening reception also included a performing arts show as part of the exhibition and was called "vibrant and magnificent".

=== 2014 Exhibition ===
The 2014 exhibition was held at the San Francisco Public Library in the African American Center from March 1 to May 15, 2014.

=== 2016 Exhibition ===
The next expanded exhibition, The Black Woman is God: Reprogramming that God Code, opened with 60 artists on July 7, 2016, and ran through August 17, 2016 at SOMArts.

Art critics called it as "timely", "organic", and "vivid". Sheila Bapat of Bitch wrote: "The exhibit intentionally turns the historic devaluation of Black women and their contributions—social, political, economical—on its head. This exhibit asserts Black women’s power and beauty and does not seek to devalue any other group in the process.... It applies pressure to the beliefs and values undergirding the laws and policies that exclude Black women’s lives from economic policymaking and their labor from economic value and protection."

=== 2017 Exhibition ===
The next exhibition, The Black Woman is God: Divine Revolution, also curated by Karen Seneferu and Melorra Green, returned to SOMArts on July 20, 2017, and ran through August 26, 2017. The exhibition had the work of 80 artists on view. SOMArts, the California Digital Library and Art Practical held a Wikipedia Edit-a-Thon on July 22 in conjunction with the exhibition "to raise the online visibility of Black women artists and challenge the gaps in art history that erase or minimize Black women's contributions as artists, activists and social change-makers."

=== 2018 Exhibition ===
The 2018 exhibit, The Black Woman is God: Assembly of Gods, was held in both San Francisco and Oakland. It had more than 80 intergenerational black women artists.
