= Ajuan Mance =

American artist, writer, and academic

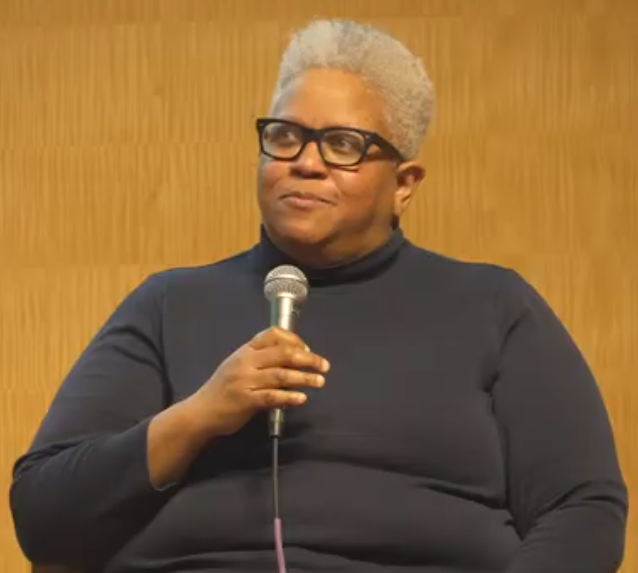
- In a panel discussion in 2026
- Born: South Carolina, United States
- Education: Brown University, University of Michigan
- Known for: 1001 Black Men
- Website: ajuanmance.com

Ajuan Maria Mance is an American visual artist, author, editor, and a professor of Ethnic Studies and English at Mills College in Oakland, California. She created the portrait series 1001 Black Men.

== Early life and education ==
Mance was born in Daytona Beach, Florida. Her family moved north to Long Island, New York where she spent most of her formative years. Her parents were both educators. She holds a B.A. from Brown University and an M.A. and Ph.D. from the University of Michigan.

== Academic career ==
Ajuan Mance was an assistant professor of English at the University of Oregon from 1995 to 1999. She then joined Mills College faculty in 1999 as an assistant professor of English and in 2005 became an associate professor of English and the Wert Chair in American Literature. In 2008, she was appointed the Aurelia Henry Reinhardt Chair in American Literature.

Through her teaching and scholarship, Mance focuses on history and Black literature in the United States. Her scholarly publications include three books: Inventing Black Women: African American Women Poets and Self-Representation, 1877-2000, Proud legacy: The "colored" schools of Malvern, Arkansas and the community that made them, and Before Harlem: An anthology of African-American literature from the long nineteenth century.

== Artistic career ==
Mance's art complements her scholarship in exploring similar themes of race, gender, identity, and history. She may be best known as the creator of the portrait series 1001 Black Men. She is the creator of a number of zines including Gender Studies, The Little Book of Big, Black Bears, and A Blues for Black Santa. "The Ancestors' Jubilee" series was exhibited at The Black Women is God 2017 exhibition, which celebrated and highlighted "the contributions of Black women as artists, healers and social change-makers throughout history."

Mance says her comics-inspired style is intended to make her "art as accessible as possible" and is based on stained glass: "When I first started drawing I thought, I’m gonna do this like stained glass. I’m going to have a heavy black line, very few planes, with a very limited color palette and different shades of the same color, but still evocative. So people say, 'Oh, this is like Picasso, or an African mask…' and all of that is true, but what I was really thinking about? I was thinking a lot about stained glass."

Mance was a judge for Prism Comics and Queer Comics Expo's Inaugural Prism Awards for representations of LGBTQAI+ characters in comics.

In 2024, Mance published a graphic memoir, Gender Studies: True Confessions of an Accidental Outlaw.
