= Fred Uhl Ball =

American artist

Fred Ball
- Fred Ball in his studio in 1978, unidentified photographer. From the collection of the Smithsonian Archives of American Art
- Born: Fred Uhl Ball; 1945; Oakland, California
- Died: 1985 (aged 39–40); Sacramento, California
- Education: Sacramento State University
- Known for: Enameling

Fred Uhl Ball (1945-1985) was an American enamelist. He has work collected in the Smithsonian American Art Museum. He is best known for The Way Home which he said is his interpretation of aerial views of the Sacramento River. He died after a violent attack in 1985 and his murder remains unsolved.

== Personal life and education ==
Fred Uhl Ball was born in Oakland, California in 1945. His mother, Kathryn Uhl, was an illustrator and enamelist who taught life drawing at Mills College and his father, F. Carlton Ball, was a ceramist who headed the art department at Mills. His grandfather, George Uhl, was a silversmith. This family influence and involvement in the arts inspired him to explore fine art in his youth. By the age of 11 he had exhibited his work and given enameling demonstrations at the California State Fair. He received his bachelor's and master's degrees in fine art from Sacramento State University. He lived and worked in Sacramento. In September 1985, he was robbed and beaten outside of his studio. He died three months later from injuries sustained during the attack.

== Fine art ==
In the early 1970s he began experimenting with placing torch-fired enamels on thin copper foil panels like a collage. Ball also explored the use of bronze as a surface by exposing white enamel at varying temperatures to create varied hues of color on the bronze. These early experiments, described as unorthodox, also had him exploring fire scale and liquid enamels, which are quite common in enameling today. In 1972 he published his first book, "Experimental Techniques in Enameling."

Ball was best known for his large scale murals. In 1976 he participated in Sacramento's federally funded Comprehensive Employment and Training Act, allowing him to create his first large-scale mural at the Sacramento Community Center. He also created a 6 foot by 62 foot mural at a Sacramento parking garage, one of the largest enamel murals, called The Way Home. The piece consists of 1,488, each 12 by 12 inch, enamel tiles set into panels which are bolted to a concrete wall. His success as a muralist allowed him to make a living through commissions and the opportunity to continue experimenting with technique. A large portion of his commissions came from corporate clients in Sacramento, including the piece The Great Sacramento Valley at Sutter General Hospital which, upon his death, was completed by his mother and artist Bruce Beck in December, 1986.

=== Reception ===
Ball's experiments and work within enameling allowed Ball to be described by the Enamel Arts Foundation as a foremost leader in the field. He was one of the first enamel artists to bringing enameling to a larger scale, from the traditional smaller sizes generally seen early in the field.

== Notable exhibitions ==
- Fred Uhl Ball Retrospective, 1987, Crocker Art Museum

== Notable collections ==
- Smithsonian American Art Museum, Washington, D.C.
