= Tin-Yuke Char =

Chinese-American historian and businessman

Tin-Yuke Char (July 4, 1905 – June 17, 1990) was a Chinese-American historian and businessman who was interested in the history of the Hakka people and Chinese people in Hawaiʻi.

== Early life and education ==
Char was born on July 4, 1905. His parents were from Zhongshan, China, and had moved to Hawaiʻi in the 1890s. Char graduated from McKinley High School in 1924. He earned a Bachelor's degree from Yenching University in 1928. While attending Yenching University, he was encouraged by William Hung to study the Hakka people and their migration. After teaching at Chongqing Nankai Secondary School in Tianjin from 1928 to 1930, Char returned to Hawaiʻi and earned a Master's degree from the University of Hawaiʻi.

In 1934 he married Wai Jane Chun, who collaborated with him on his research on the history of Chinese people in Hawaiʻi. They had four children.

== Career ==
After earning his Master's degree, Char taught Chinese language and history at the University. He returned to China and worked at Lingnan University from 1936 to 1938. When tensions from the Sino-Japanese War rose, he and his family returned to Hawaiʻi. In 1939 Char began working at a home insurance company. He became the first person in Hawaiʻi to earn the Chartered Property Casualty Underwriter designation. In 1952 he founded the Continental Insurance Agency of Hawaiʻi, which he led until his retirement in 1969.

After his retirement Char was able to fully dedicate himself to his true passion, the history of the Hakka people and of Chinese people overseas, especially in Hawaiʻi. Char and Chun supported the Hawaiʻi Chinese History Center, which was founded in 1971. He was active in many community organizations both before and after retirement.

Char died on June 17, 1990. After his death, the Asian Pacific Reading Room at Kapiʻolani Community College was dedicated in his and Wai Chun's name.

== Bibliography ==
- Char, Tin-Yuke; Kwock, C.H. (1969). The Hakka Chinese: their origin and folk songs. San Francisco: Jade Mountain Press.
- Char, Tin-Yuke, ed. (1975). The Sandalwood Mountains: readings and stories of the early Chinese in Hawaii. ISBN 9780824803056.
- Char, Tin-Yuke (1977). The Bamboo Path : Life and Writings of a Chinese in Hawaii. Hawaii Chinese History Center.
