= Susan Tolman Mills =

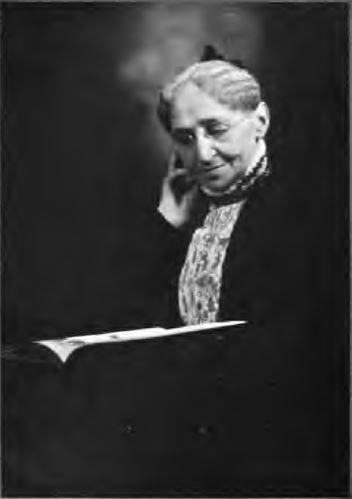
Susan Tolman Mills, Who's who among the women of California

Susan Tolman Mills (November 18, 1826 – December 12, 1912) was the co-founder of Mills College (formerly the Young Ladies Seminary at Benicia, California).

== Background ==
Mills was born on November 18, 1826, in Enosburgh, Vermont. She was one of eight children of John Tolman and Elizabeth (Nichols) Tolman. Her family moved to Ware, Massachusetts by 1836, where her father and brothers expanded the family's tannery business. She graduated from Mount Holyoke College (then Mount Holyoke Female Seminary) in 1845.

As a young woman, Mills taught at Mount Holyoke Female Seminary the first three years after she herself graduated, and was a teacher there during Emily Dickinson's year at the Seminary in 1847–1848. She continued to teach at the seminary until she married the missionary Cyrus Mills on September 11, 1848. In October of that year they departed to teach in Ceylon (now Sri Lanka), on an assignment from the American Board of Commissioners for Foreign Missions. They taught there for many years, until they returned to Boston in 1854. Mrs. Mills contracted amoebic dysentery during their tour abroad, and was in distinctly ill health by the time they returned to the United States.

=== Oahu School ===
In 1860 the couple traveled to Honolulu where Cyrus Mills became president of Oahu College (now known as Punahou School). Susan served as a teacher at the school, instructing in geography, geology, chemistry, and botany. They moved to California in 1864.

=== Mills College ===
Mills College was initially founded as the Young Ladies Seminary at Benicia in 1852. It was under the leadership of Mary Atkins, a graduate of Oberlin College. Susan and Cyrus Mills bought the grounds and organization from Atkins for $5000 in 1865.

In 1866, Susan and Cyrus bought the Young Ladies Seminary and renamed it Mills Seminary.

In 1871 the school was moved to Oakland, California and the school was incorporated in 1877. The school became Mills College in 1885. In 1890, after serving for decades as principal (under two presidents as well), Susan became the President of the college and held the position for 19 years.

== Death ==
Mills retired in 1909 and died in Oakland, California, on December 12, 1912. Susan Tolman Mills is buried at Sunnyside Cemetery, located on the Mills College Campus.

Academic offices
Preceded by Charles Carroll Stratton	President of Mills College; 1890–1909	Succeeded by Luella Clay Carson
