= Albert Bender (art patron) =

Patron of the arts

- portrait detail, from Grabhorn Press, San Francisco
- Born: Albert Maurice Bender; June 18, 1866; Dublin, Ireland
- Died: March 4, 1941 (aged 74); San Francisco, United States
- Occupation: insurance broker
- Known for: art patron

Albert Maurice Bender (June 18, 1866 – March, 4 1941) was a German-Irish-American art collector who was one of the leading patrons of the arts in San Francisco in the 1920s and 1930s. He played a key role in the early career of Ansel Adams and was one of Diego Rivera's first American patrons. By providing financial assistance to artists, writers, and institutions, he had a significant impact on the cultural development of the San Francisco Bay Area and beyond.

== Early life ==
Albert Maurice Bender was born in Dublin, Ireland, in 1866, the son of Rabbi Philip Bender and Augusta Bremer Bender, both of whom were German. In 1881 he immigrated to the United States in the company of one of his maternal uncles, Joseph Bremer. Bremer and his brother William had already settled in San Francisco, and William hired the young Bender to work in his insurance office. Bender eventually became a very successful insurance broker in his own right.

== Patron of the arts ==
A lover of literature from an early age, Bender began collecting rare books and helped create the Book Club of California in 1912. Inspired by his cousin Anne Bremer, a professional artist, Bender began collecting art, with an emphasis on work by local artists and the arts of China, Japan and Tibet. He became very interested in getting to know and help the artists and writers of the San Francisco Bay Area.

Bender enjoyed giving things away even more than he liked acquiring them, and he became a prolific donor to Bay Area museums and libraries. He was once called "the most active buyer—and donor—of the work of California artists the state had ever known." He donated significant collections to what are now the Fine Arts Museums of San Francisco, the San Francisco Museum of Modern Art, the Mills College Art Museum, and the University of California Berkeley Art Museum and Pacific Film Archive.

Beginning in 1932 he donated 260 pieces of Asian art to the National Museum of Ireland in memory of his mother. He gave collections of rare books and fine printing to Mills College, Stanford University, the University of California and the San Francisco Public Library.

His generosity in Europe earned him the titles of Fellow of the Royal Society of Antiquaries of Ireland, Fellow of the Royal Geographical Society, Chevalier of the Legion of Honor of France and Cavaliere of the Crown of Italy. He received honorary degrees from Mills College and the University of California, Berkeley. Stanford University has a Bender Room in its library, and at Mills College there is a Bender Room in the former Margaret Carnegie Library.

Bender served as a trustee of Mills College, a commissioner of the San Francisco Public Library, and a board member of the California Society of Etchers (today's California Society of Printmakers), California Historical Society, Book Club of California, Japan Society, the Home for Aged Disabled, and the San Francisco Symphony, Art Association, Museum of Art, Opera Association, and Opera Guild.

Bender helped launch the career of many artists and photographers, including Ansel Adams. He financed the publication of Adams's first portfolio (Parmelian Prints of the High Sierras, 1927) and his first book (Taos Pueblo, with author Mary Hunter Austin, 1930).

== Judaism ==
Bender was described as "the best-known Jew in San Francisco" in the 1930s. He "was a founding board member of the Federation of Jewish Charities and a long-time congregant of Emanu-El, whose cavernous sanctuary could not hold all who came to his funeral."

== Albert Bender Exhibition, Dublin ==
A permanent exhibition at the National Museum of Ireland opened in 2008, entitled "A Dubliner's Collection of Asian Art - The Albert Bender Exhibition." This exhibition displays the material donated by Bender to the National Museum of Ireland during the 1930s when his gifting, initially refused, (Note: When Albert Bender decided to donate Asian art to the National Museum ... Mahr did attempt to explain to him that the Museum’s main ... remit was ... Irish material culture... Mahr suggested that Albert Bender establish instead an ‘Augusta Bender Archaeological Library’ or an ‘Augusta Bender Room’ of archaeological finds, rather than forming an Asian art collection in Dublin.) was accepted by the museum's director Adolf Mahr, later the leader of the Nazi party in Ireland. The collection is on display at the museum's Decorative Arts and History site at Collins Barracks, Dublin. The modern remounting of this exhibition displays a selection from the 260 objects of Asian art Bender donated, with one of the most important set of objects being the set of rare thangkas (Buddhist tapestries) from 18th-century Tibet. There is also a large display of Japanese woodblock prints, Chinese metalwork and religious figures.

== Additional resources ==
- The Bender Papers in the F.W. Olin Library, Mills College, consist of 5,344 items, including letters from many of the prominent authors of the day. Some 675 of these items are available on microfilm at the Smithsonian Archives of American Art.
- The Bender Collection at the Library of Trinity College Dublin, presented by Albert Bender in memory of his father.
- The Albert Bender Papers in the Special Collections department of the Green Library at Stanford University preserves a smaller collection that includes letters, Bender's handwritten will and funeral instructions leaving everything to "my dearest & best-beloved Anne Bremer," and his collection of autographs of musical composers and performers.
- Ann Harlow, "Albert Bender: Artists' Patron 'Saint,'" Argonaut (San Francisco Museum and Historical Society) 19:2 (Winter 2008), pp. 60–75.
- San Francisco Biographies, 1931
