= Art Practical =

Online arts magazine

- Available in: English
- Founded: 2009
- Headquarters: San Francisco, {{{location_country}}}
- Owner: California College of the Arts
- Website: Art Practical.com

Art Practical is an online arts magazine based in San Francisco producing arts criticism, essays, quarterly issues, and programming related to contemporary art and visual culture in the Bay Area and beyond.

== History ==
The magazine was established in 2009 by Patricia Maloney, who served as director and editor-in-chief until 2015. In 2013, the publication acquired and incorporated the events website Happenstand and the arts publication Daily Serving, which maintained its independent site with Maloney as director. Beginning in 2015, the California College of the Arts became the publisher of Art Practical and Daily Serving with Maloney transitioning to executive director and with Kara Q. Smith and Bean Gilsdorf, respectively, as editors-in-chief. In March 2015, Maloney resigned and took the position of executive director of Southern Exposure. Michele Carlson was named as the new executive director in May 2016.

== Publication ==
The magazine has produced over 1,000 reviews, hundreds of columns, and more than a dozen thematic issues organized by staff and guest editors. The publication also hosts a user-submitted events calendar for arts and cultural events in the San Francisco Bay Area.

== Programming ==
The magazine has organized programming and partnered with numerous organizations including The Lab, San Francisco Museum of Modern Art, Ratio 3, and the Asian Contemporary Arts Consortium.

The publication was awarded a residency in 2011 in Kansas City via the Charlotte Street Foundation and Spencer Museum of Art and a residency in 2012 in Miami via Cannonball (formerly Legal Art Miami).

From 2013-2016, the magazine co-sponsored an artist residency with the Yerba Buena Center for the Arts. The recipients of the three residencies were Chris Vargas (2013), Nomi Talisman and Dee Hilbert-Jones (2014), and Jerome Reyes (2016).
