= Mills College =

Private college in Oakland, California

- Former names: Young Ladies' Seminary (1852–1865); Mills Seminary (1865–1906); Mills College (1885–2022)
- Motto: Un Destinatio, Viae Diversae
- Motto in English: One Destination, Many Paths
- Type: Private college
- Established: 1852; 174 years ago
- Parent institution: Northeastern University
- Dean: Beth D. Kochly
- Students: 1,037
- Location: Oakland, California, U.S. 37°46′47″N 122°10′56″W
- Campus: Urban, 135 acres (55 ha)
- Website: mills.northeastern.edu oakland.northeastern.edu

Mills College at Northeastern University in Oakland, California, is part of Northeastern University's global university system. Mills College was founded as the Young Ladies Seminary in 1852 in Benicia, California, and in 1885 was renamed to Mills College; it was relocated to Oakland in 1871 and became the second women's college west of the Rockies. In 2022, it became a part of Northeastern University.

== History ==
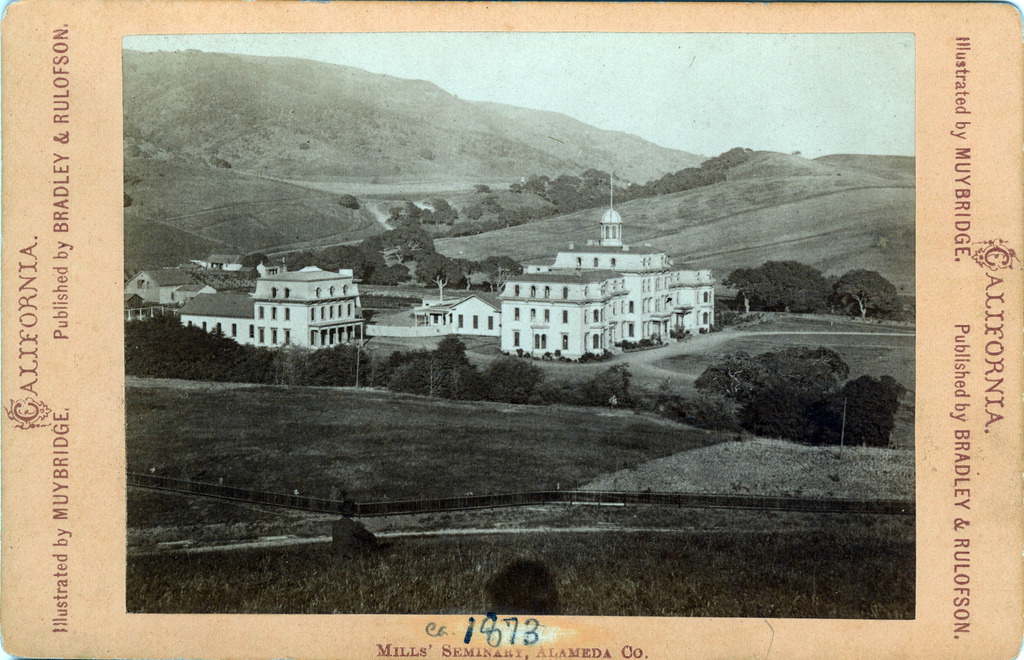
Mills Seminary, circa 1873.

Mills College was initially founded as the Young Ladies Seminary in the city of Benicia in 1852 under the leadership of Mary Atkins, a graduate of Oberlin College.

In 1865, Susan Tolman Mills, a graduate of Mount Holyoke College (then Mount Holyoke Female Seminary), and her husband, Cyrus Mills, bought the Young Ladies Seminary renaming it Mills Seminary. In 1871, the school was moved to its current location in Oakland, California. The school was incorporated in 1877 and was officially renamed Mills College in 1885. In 1890, after serving for decades as principal (under two presidents as well), Susan Mills became the president of the college and held the position for 19 years.

Beginning in 1906 the seminary classes were progressively eliminated. In 1920, Mills added graduate programs for women and men, granting its first master's degrees the following year.

Other notable milestones in the college's history include the presidency of renowned educator and activist Aurelia Henry Reinhardt during World War I and II, the establishment of the first laboratory school west of the Mississippi for aspiring teachers (currently known as the Mills College Children's School) in 1926, and becoming the first women's college to offer a computer science major (1974).

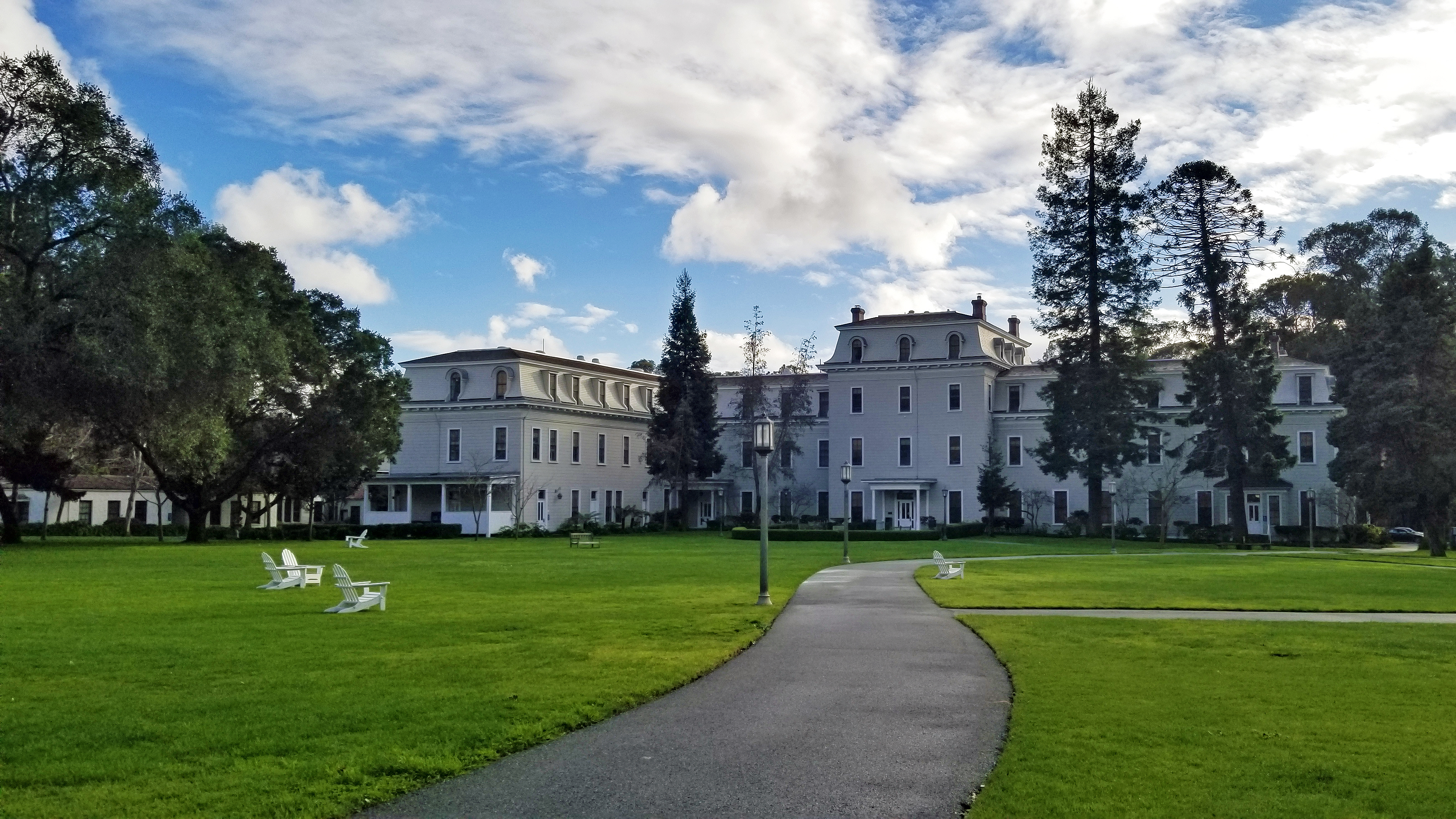
Mills Hall viewed from across Holmgren Meadow on the Mills College at Northeastern University campus

=== Reversal of decision to go co-ed ===
In 1990, Mills became the first and only women's college in the US to reverse a decision to go coed. On May 3, 1990, Mills Trustees announced that they had voted to admit male undergraduate students to Mills. This decision led to a two-week student and staff strike, accompanied by numerous displays of non-violent protests by the students. At one point, nearly 300 students blockaded the administrative offices and boycotted classes. On May 18, the Trustees met again to reconsider the decision, leading to a reversal of the vote to go co-ed on the undergraduate level.

=== First single-sex college to formally welcome transgender students ===
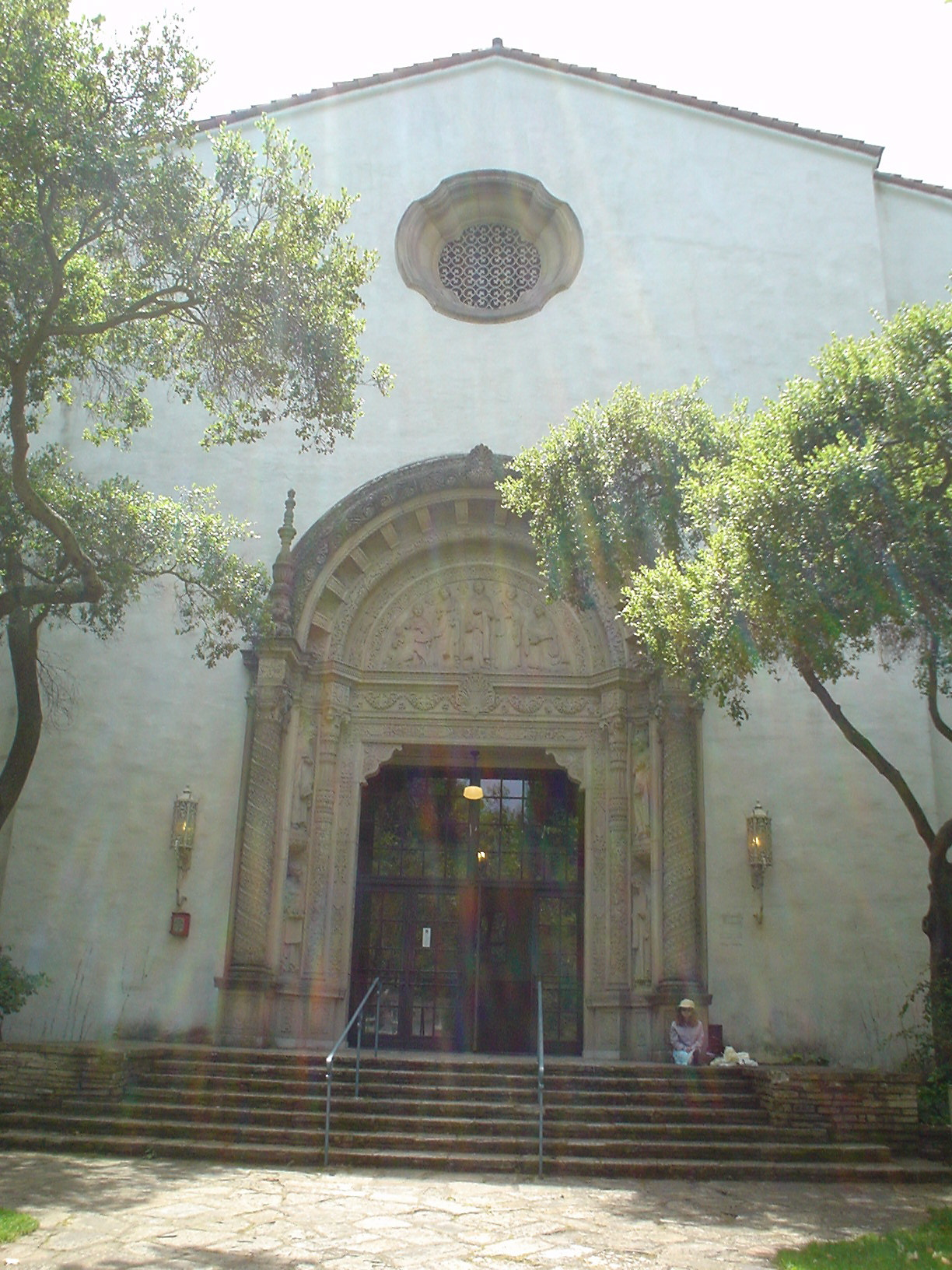
Littlefield Concert Hall, built in 1928.

In 2014, Mills became the first single-sex college in the U.S. to adopt an admission policy explicitly welcoming transgender students. The policy stated that undergraduate students who were not assigned to the female sex at birth, but who self-identified as women, were welcome to apply for admission. Undergraduates who were assigned to the female sex at birth, but identified as transgender or gender fluid, also were welcome to apply for admission. The policy further clarified that undergraduate students assigned to the female sex at birth who had legally become male prior to applying were not eligible for admission to Mills. The policy ended with a statement that "once admitted, any student who completes the College's graduate requirements shall be awarded a degree," indicating that once admitted to Mills, an undergraduate female student who changed gender to male would be allowed to complete their degree at the college.

=== Financial difficulties and re-visioning ===
In 2017, Mills declared a financial emergency, citing declining student enrollment and revenues, and laid off some tenured faculty. That September, it became the first private college in California to implement a tuition reset, announcing a 36% reduction in its undergraduate tuition beginning in fall 2018, with a goal of making a Mills education more affordable. Undergraduate tuition in the 2018–2019 academic year was $28,765 (reduced from $44,765); room and board costs were $13,448. Students are still able to receive merit scholarships and need-based financial aid in addition to the tuition reduction.

In March 2021, one year into the COVID-19 pandemic, Mills announced plans to no longer be an independent, degree-granting college but rather a research institute known as the Mills Institute. Following this announcement, multiple higher education institutions reached out to Mills to explore merger options.

=== Merger with Northeastern University ===
In June 2021, the college announced a plan to merge with Boston-based Northeastern University and become a co-ed regional campus as part of Northeastern's global university system. Multiple lawsuits opposing the merger were filed by parties including two Mills College trustees and a substantial number of current Mills students.

The merger between Mills and Northeastern was finalized in June 2022, and the school was renamed Mills College at Northeastern University.

== Academics ==
Its most popular majors, based on 2020–21 graduates, were:

- Psychology (16)
- English Language & Literature (13)
- Sociology (13)
- Health Policy Analysis (12)
- Biology/Biological Sciences (11)
- Child Development (10)
- Fine/Studio Arts (10)

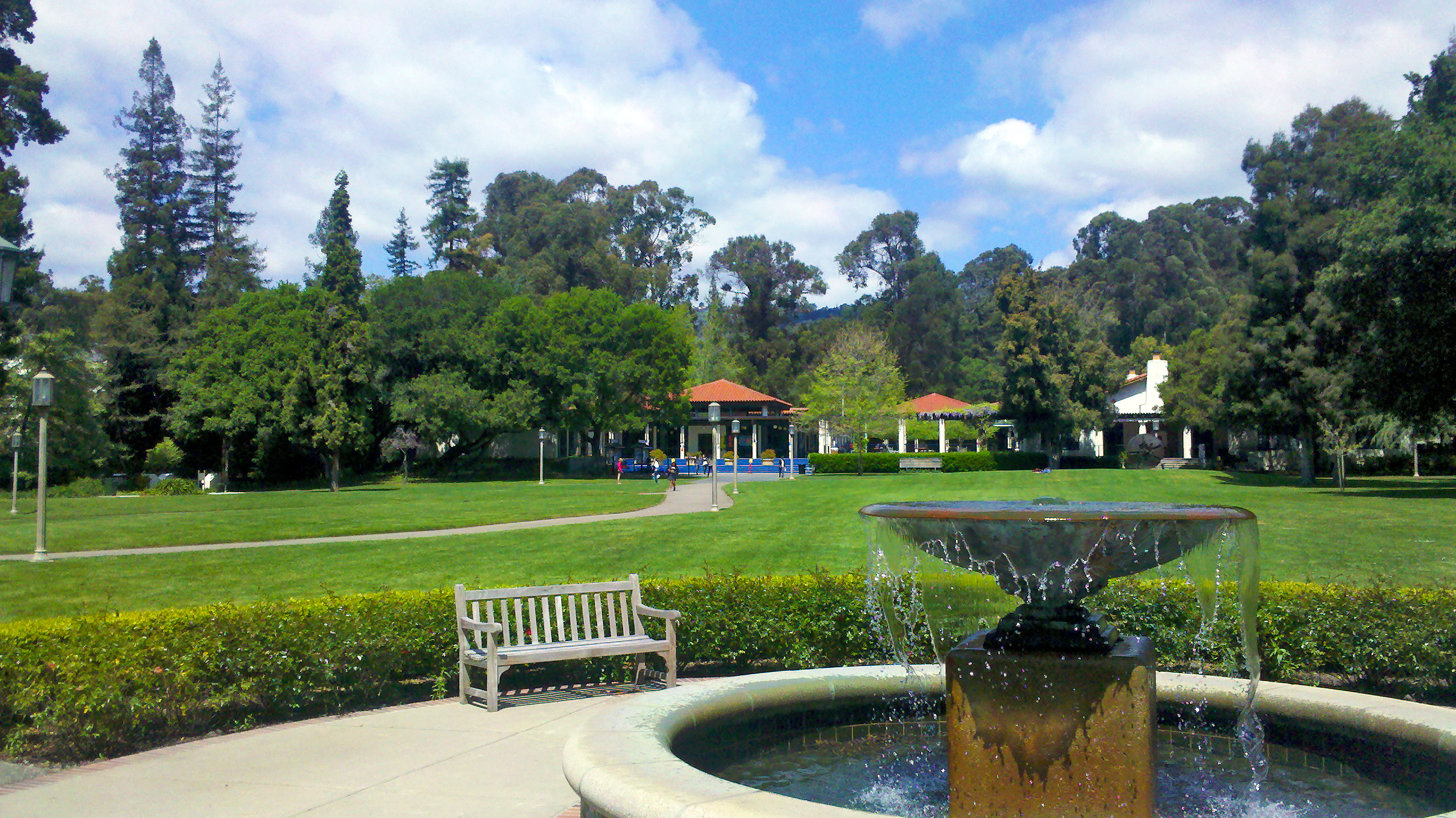
Holmgren Meadow and Rothwell Center on the Mills College at Northeastern campus

=== Accreditation ===
Northeastern University is accredited by the New England Commission of Higher Education.

=== Faculty ===
Notable Mills faculty have included famous expressionist and cubist painter and comic strip pioneer Lyonel Feininger; modernist composers Darius Milhaud and Luciano Berio; experimental and electronic music composer and performer Pauline Oliveros; contemporary artist Hung Liu; postmodern dance pioneer Anna Halprin; award-winning scholar, filmmaker and activist Susan Stryker; book artist Julie Chen; visual artist and author Ajuan Mance; choreographer and performer Molissa Fenley; experimental musicians/composers/performers Maggi Payne, Chris Brown, Fred Frith, Roscoe Mitchell and James Fei; young adult author Kathryn Reiss; poet and editor Juliana Spahr; computer scientist Ellen Spertus; and artist/photographer Catherine Wagner.

== Rankings (pre-merger) ==
Academic rankings

Master's
- Washington Monthly: 6

Regional
- U.S. News & World Report: 5

National
- Forbes: 343

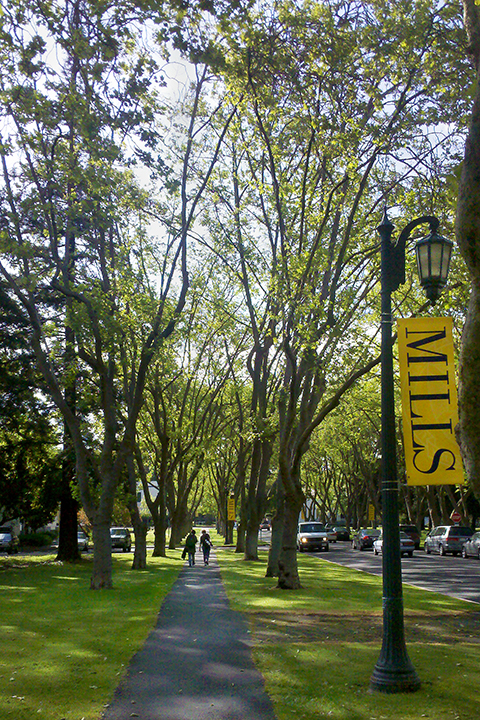
Students walk along tree-lined Richards Road near the entrance to Mills.

For 2021, U.S. News & World Report ranked Mills in the following "Best Regional Universities West" categories:

- No. 1 in Best Value Schools
- No. 1 in Best Undergraduate Teaching
- No. 8 in Most Innovative Schools (tied)
- No. 12 in Regional Universities West
- No. 13 in Top Performers on Social Mobility (tied)

For 2021, The Princeton Review included Mills in the following lists and ranked Mills in the following categories:

- The Best 386 Colleges
- Best Western (regional colleges)
- Green Colleges
- No. 9 for Administrators Get Low Marks
- No. 13 Most Liberal Students
- No. 14 LGBTQ-Friendly
- No. 15 for Stone-Cold Sober Students
- No. 20 for Least Religious Students

In 2020, Washington Monthly ranked Mills sixth out of 614 schools on its Master's Universities list, based on its contribution to the public good as measured by social mobility, research, and promoting public service.

In 2019, Forbes included Mills as one of the 650 best schools in the United States out of a possible 4,300 degree-granting postsecondary institutions. Forbes ranked Mills as follows:

- No. 343 in Top Colleges 2019
- No. 227 in Private Colleges
- No. 70 in the West

== Student life ==
=== Student body demographics ===
For the 2018–19 academic year, Mills student body included 1,255 students, with 766 undergraduate women and 489 graduate students of all genders. Forty-one states are represented in the student body, and international students from 15 countries attend the college. The average class size at Mills is 16 students, with a student:faculty ratio of 11:1. The average class size at Mills is small, with 76% of Mills classes having 20 students or less. For the 2023–24 academic year, Mills student body included 1,037 students: 800 first year undergraduate students, 119 first-year graduate students, and 136 continuing Mills students across undergraduate and graduate programs.

Fifty-six percent of the undergraduate students self-identify as students of color or multi-racial. Sixteen percent of the undergraduate population are "Resumer" students who are 23 years or older and returning to college. Over half of Mills Undergraduates live on-campus in any of the twelve housing options offered by the college.

Forty-one percent of the graduate students self-identify as students of color or multi-racial. Of the graduate student body, eighty-six percent are full-time students. Over three-quarters of Graduate students commute to campus with only thirteen percent opting to live on-campus.

=== Student clubs and organizations ===
There are more than 50 student organizations at Mills run by both undergraduate and graduate students. These groups host campus-wide art exhibitions, dance performances, concerts, and lectures, as well as annual events such as Black & White Ball, Earth Day Fair, and Spring Fling.

Students also participate in the Associated Students of Mills College (ASMC), an executive board of elected and appointed positions. Under the governance of a student-drafted Constitution, the board manages and disburses an annual budget that supports more than 50 student organizations, student publications, campus-wide events, and various student initiatives. ASMC is the voice of the student body to the college administration.

Mills' undergraduate student publications include the Campanil, the campus newspaper; the Crest, the Mills College yearbook; and the Mills Academic Research Journal (MARJ). Additional Mills publications include The Walrus Literary Journal, the Womanist, A Women of Color Journal, and the 580 Split journal of arts and letters.

== Athletics ==
Prior to the 2022 merger, the school's athletic teams competed as the Mills College Cyclones. Mills was a member of the NCAA Division III ranks, primarily competing in the Coast to Coast Athletic Conference (C2C).

Mills fielded six intercollegiate women's varsity sports teams: cross country, rowing, soccer, swimming, tennis and volleyball.

All varsity sports at Mills College at Northeastern are currently on hold in light of the new merger.

=== Facilities ===
==== Trefethen Aquatic Center ====
The Trefethen Aquatic Center features a large outdoor swimming pool and hot tub with lockers available for use. Trefethen is accessible to Mills students, faculty, staff, and immediate family free of charge, and is available to the public for use for a minimal fee. Hosted pool activities include lap swimming, water aerobics, and swim lessons.

==== Meyer Tennis Center ====
Meyer Tennis Center at Mills features six lighted courts and is used for recreation, rental events, and competitions. The tennis courts are available to key-holding members of the Mills community and key-holding public visitors and facility renters.

==== Haas Pavilion Fitness Center and Gymnasium ====
Mills students, faculty, staff and alumnae have access to a fitness center housed inside of Haas Pavilion. Haas Gymnasium, also housed within the pavilion, is available for rental and also is available for general recreational use by Mills students, employees, and alumnae.

==== Hellman Soccer Field ====
Hellman Soccer Field and the surrounding running track is well-used by Mills students, faculty, staff, alumnae, and members of the local community. The field is available for rental to the public.

== Campus ==
The 135-acre (0.55 km^{2}) Mills College campus is located in the foothills of Oakland, California, on the eastern shore of the San Francisco Bay.

=== Notable campus resources ===
==== Center for Contemporary Music ====
The San Francisco Tape Music Center moved to Mills Campus in 1966, became the Mills Tape Music Center, and was later renamed the Center for Contemporary Music (CCM). The CCM's archives contains over 50 years of collected recordings made at the San Francisco Tape Music Center and at Mills. CCM internationally renowned as a leading center for innovation in music, and functions as an important resource center for Bay Area composers and artists. Its facilities feature a 24-track recording studio, hybrid computer music studio, electronic music studio, dubbing and editing studio, technical and project development lab, Studio V, and the musicianship lab.

Housed within the Mills Music Building since 1966, CCM has emphasized experimental methods in contemporary music and its allied arts and sciences. CCM maintains a variety of electronic equipment, instruments and studios, provides instruction and technical assistance, and archives audio recordings. The center also performs a wide variety of community services in the arts, including public concerts and lecture series, informational and technical assistance, and artist residencies. Maggi Payne and Chris Brown are presently co-directors of CCM. Payne is a composer, performer, interdisciplinary artist, and recording engineer. Brown is an instrument builder, a pianist, and a composer.

The music program at Mills is noted for being at the forefront of experimental music study and composition. Well-known composer Luciano Berio was on the music faculty of Mills in 1962–1964, and in 1966 Pauline Oliveros became the first director of the Tape Music Center (later the Center for Contemporary Music), where she composed her electronic works "Alien Bog" and "Beautiful Soop". Morton Subotnick, later a member of the faculty, received his master's degree from Mills, studying composition with Leon Kirchner and Darius Milhaud. Laurie Anderson, Dave Brubeck, Joanna Newsom, Phil Lesh, Noah Georgeson, Holly Herndon, and Steve Reich attended the program, as well as the famous synthesizer designer Don Buchla. Terry Riley taught at Mills starting in the early 1970s. Avant-garde jazz pioneer Anthony Braxton has taught at Mills on an intermittent basis since the 1970s. Lou Harrison, Pandit Pran Nath, Iannis Xenakis, Alvin Curran, Gordon Mumma, Maggi Payne, Pauline Oliveros, Frederic Rzewski, Zeena Parkins, Fred Frith, and many others have all taught music at Mills.

==== F.W. Olin Library ====
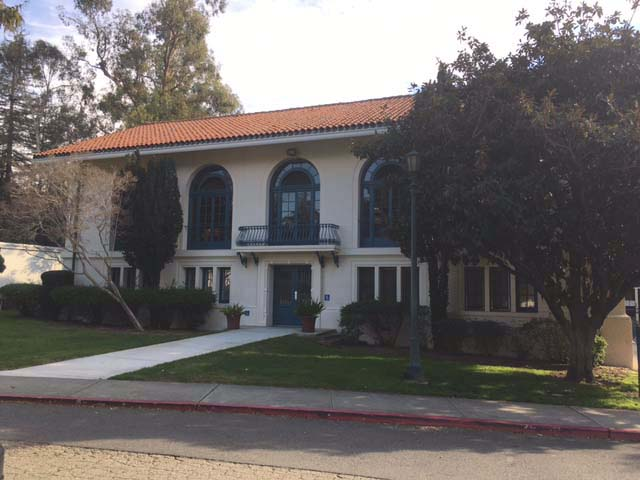
The F.W. Olin Library is centrally located on the Mills College at Northeastern campus. The library is home to the Heller Rare Book Room, Special Collections, and the Center for the Book.

The F.W. Olin Library houses a collection of over 240,000 volumes and other media, with special emphasis on literature, history, women's studies, art and music. It also offers access to more than 60 online databases including: Academic Search, LexisNexis, PsycINFO, Sociological Abstracts, MEDLINE, ERIC, MLA Bibliography, Contemporary Women's Issues, Britannica Online, Biography Resource Center, and Science Direct, and many more. The library includes 280 study and workstations, a listening-viewing room with fully equipped audio-visual stations, and a seminar room. Open 88.5 hours a week, the library's online catalog, MINERVA, is accessible throughout the library and via the internet.

The Special Collections is housed within the library in the Heller Rare Book Room and includes printed books from the 15th century to the present, as well as the Mills College Collection. Containing 12,000 volumes and 10,000 manuscripts, Special Collections features a leaf from a Gutenberg Bible and a Florentine edition of Dante's La divina commedia. It is also home to the Mills Center for the Book, a forum for cultural, literary, and aesthetic heritage of the book. In October 2020 the college sold its copy of Shakespeare's First Folio from 1623 for $9.9 million to make up for revenue shortfalls.

Mills is also home to the Center for the Book which was established in 1989 to promote the cultural, literary, and aesthetic heritage of the book. Programs and projects encompass contemporary and historical concerns, and include the book arts, literacy, and local history. The Center for the Book involves both Mills and the local communities, acknowledging the extraordinarily rich resources of the Bay Area.

==== Mills College Art Museum ====
Open to the public, the Mills College Art Museum is home to a collection of more than 8,000 works of art—the largest permanent collection of any liberal arts college on the West Coast. The collection includes old masters and modern American and European prints and drawings; Asian textiles; Japanese, Ancient American, and modern ceramics; and California regionalist paintings.

Works from the permanent collection—including pieces by Pablo Picasso, Diego Rivera, Winslow Homer, Rembrandt van Rijn, Henri Matisse, and Auguste Renoir—are displayed with a regularly hanging series of exhibitions that are designed to provoke, inspire, and even amuse. Mills students have an opportunity to get involved in every aspect of the museum's work, including archival research, editing, photography, design, and installations. Undergraduates train to become curators, putting together exhibitions with art from the collection. Every year art students also take on the management of the Senior and MFA exhibitions.

==== Mills College Children's School ====
Founded in 1926 on the Mills campus, the Children's School is the oldest laboratory school west of the Mississippi River. From its inception, the Children's School has had the dual function of providing education for both children and adults. A member of the East Bay Independent Schools Association, the Children's School is open to the children of Mills students, faculty, and staff as well as the general public.

Northeastern University suspended new enrollments in the Children's School in 2025 and announced that the school will close on June 30, 2026.

=== Notable campus buildings ===
- Mills Hall
- U.S. National Register of Historic Places
- California Historical Landmark
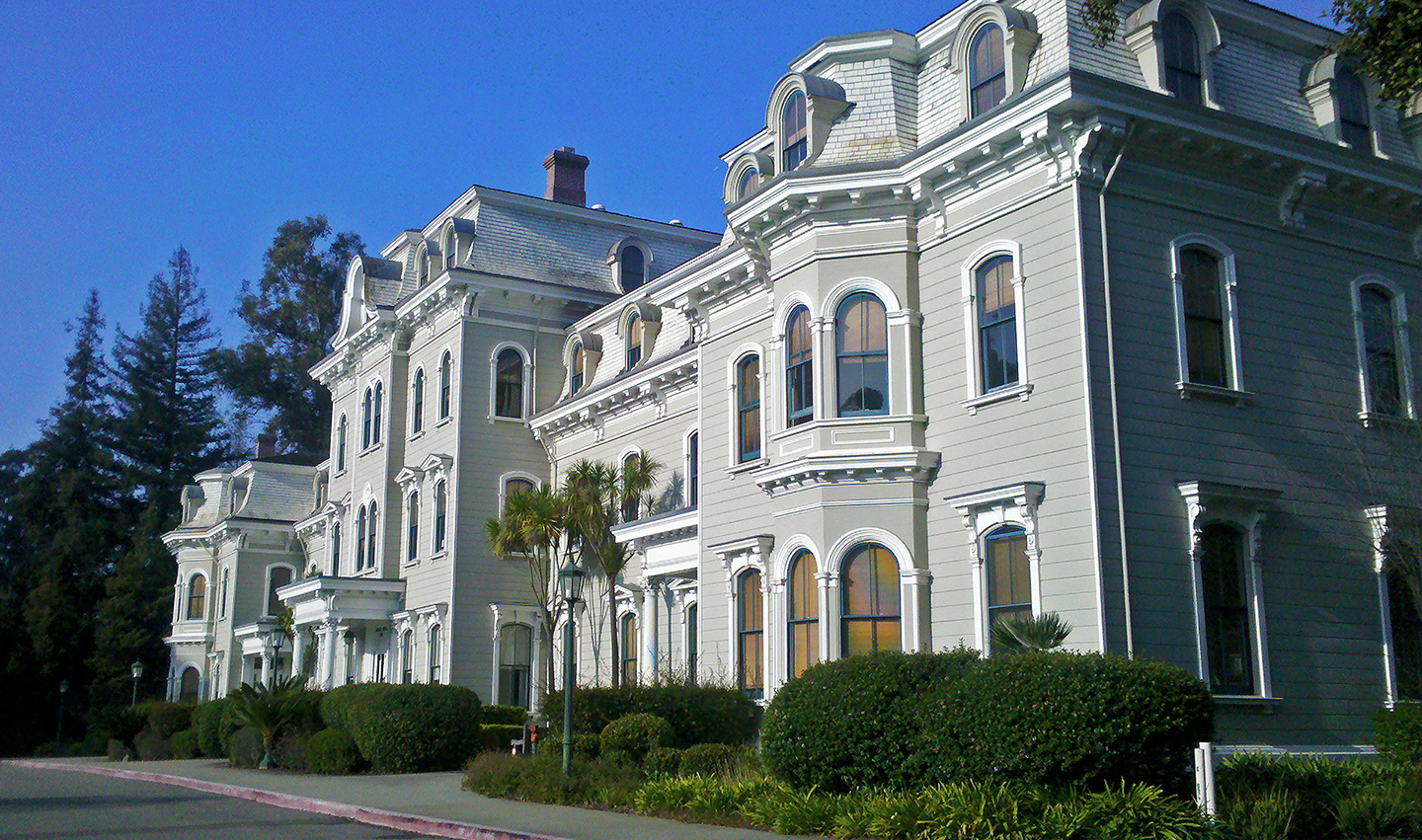
- Coordinates: 37.7797°N 122.1822°W
- Built: 1871
- Architect: S. C. Bugbee & Son
- NRHP reference No.: 71000132
- CHISL No.: 849

Significant dates
- Added to NRHP: October 14, 1971
- Designated CHISL: 1971

==== Mills Hall ====
Designed in 1869 by S. C. Bugbee & Son, Mills Hall became the college's new home when it moved from Benicia to Oakland in 1871. Mills Hall is "a long, four-story building with a high central observatory. The mansarded structure, which provided homes for faculty and students as well as classrooms and dining halls, long was considered the most beautiful educational building in the state". Mills Hall is a California Historical Landmark and is listed in the National Register of Historic Places.

==== Betty Irene Moore Natural Sciences Building ====
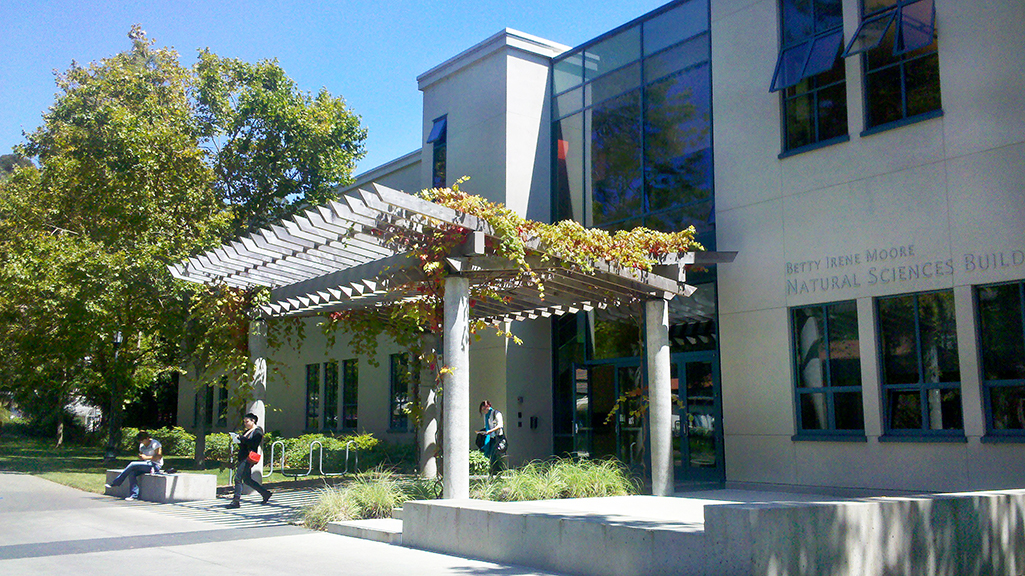
After class, students exit the Betty Irene Moore Natural Sciences Building on the Mills campus.

Completed in 2007, the Natural Sciences Building was the first Leadership in Energy and Environmental Design (LEED) "green" building at Mills and the first building in Oakland, California, to earn a LEED platinum certification. The facility met the most rigorous standards for materials selection, energy consumption, and water usage and was awarded platinum certification.

Specifically designed to bring together the fields of biology, chemistry, physics, and psychology, Moore Natural Sciences Building encourages collaboration and research across disciplines. The building features state of the art equipment including: the Scheffler Bio-Imaging Center which contains a transilluminating fluorescence microscope with digital camera and imaging software, walk-in warm and cold rooms, and a marine culture system. The building's instrumentation includes: an atomic absorption spectrophotometer, a Fourier transform infrared spectrometer, a Fourier transform nuclear magnetic resonance spectrometer, ultraviolet-visible spectrophotometers, an electrochemistry apparatus, high-performance liquid chromatographs, gas-liquid chromatographs, and standard low-speed and high-speed ultracentrifuges as well as numerous smaller instruments

The science facility offers a wide variety of classroom, laboratory, and research space equipped with up-to-date instrumentation, special outdoor teaching courtyards, and is located adjacent to the William Joseph McInnes Botanic Garden for hands-on research and study.

==== Julia Morgan Buildings ====
In 1904, Mills president Susan Mills became interested in architect Julia Morgan because she wished to further the career of a female architect, and because Morgan, just beginning her career, charged less than her male counterparts. Morgan designed six buildings for the Mills campus, including El Campanil, believed to be the first freestanding bell tower on a United States college campus. El Campanil consists of 72 feet of reinforced concrete in a Spanish Mission-style and resides in front of Seminary Hall. The bell tower has a low pitched red tile roof and seven arched openings for the ten bells. The nails and lock of the large wooden door to El Campanil come from an old Spanish church in Mexico. Morgan's reputation grew when the tower was unscathed by the 1906 San Francisco earthquake. The bells in the tower were cast for the World's Columbian Exposition (Chicago, 1893), and given to Mills by trustee David Hewes. The ten bells were named after the graces of the spirit to emphasize the school's commitment to the Christian mission; Faith, Hope, Peace, Joy, Love, Meekness, Gentleness, Self Control, Longing, Suffering. Surrounding the structure are southern California flora adorn earthenware jars that Morgan designed in the style of those at the Alhambra.

The Margaret Carnegie Library (1906), which was named after Andrew Carnegie's daughter. The Ming Quong Home for Chinese girls, built in 1924 and purchased by Mills in 1936, which was renamed Alderwood Hall and now houses the Julia Morgan School for Girls (independent of the college). She designed the Student Union in 1916. Kapiolani Cottage, which has served as an infirmary, faculty housing, and administration offices. And finally, Mills's original gymnasium and pool, which have been replaced by the Tea Shop and Suzanne Adams Plaza.

==== Lorry I. Lokey Graduate of Business and Public Policy Building ====
Completed in 2010, the two-story, 28,000-square-foot Lokey School of Business building was the first business school in the state of California to earn a Leadership in Energy and Environmental Design (LEED) gold certification from the U.S. Green Building Council. The building "features wide covered porches across the building's front and sides, extending collaboration and community from the interior. Two lecture halls with tiered seating for 50 students and four classrooms for 25 to 40 students ... while breakout rooms and a student lounge support focused teamwork and informal group discussion. The centerpiece of the building is a spectacular Gathering Hall, flanked by an exterior terrace and iris pond. The building incorporates an array of multimedia technology such as video conferencing, podcasting, wired and wireless areas in "smart" classrooms and a state-of-the-art computer laboratory, all of which facilitate Internet access and information-sharing locally, regionally and globally."

==== Mills College School of Education ====
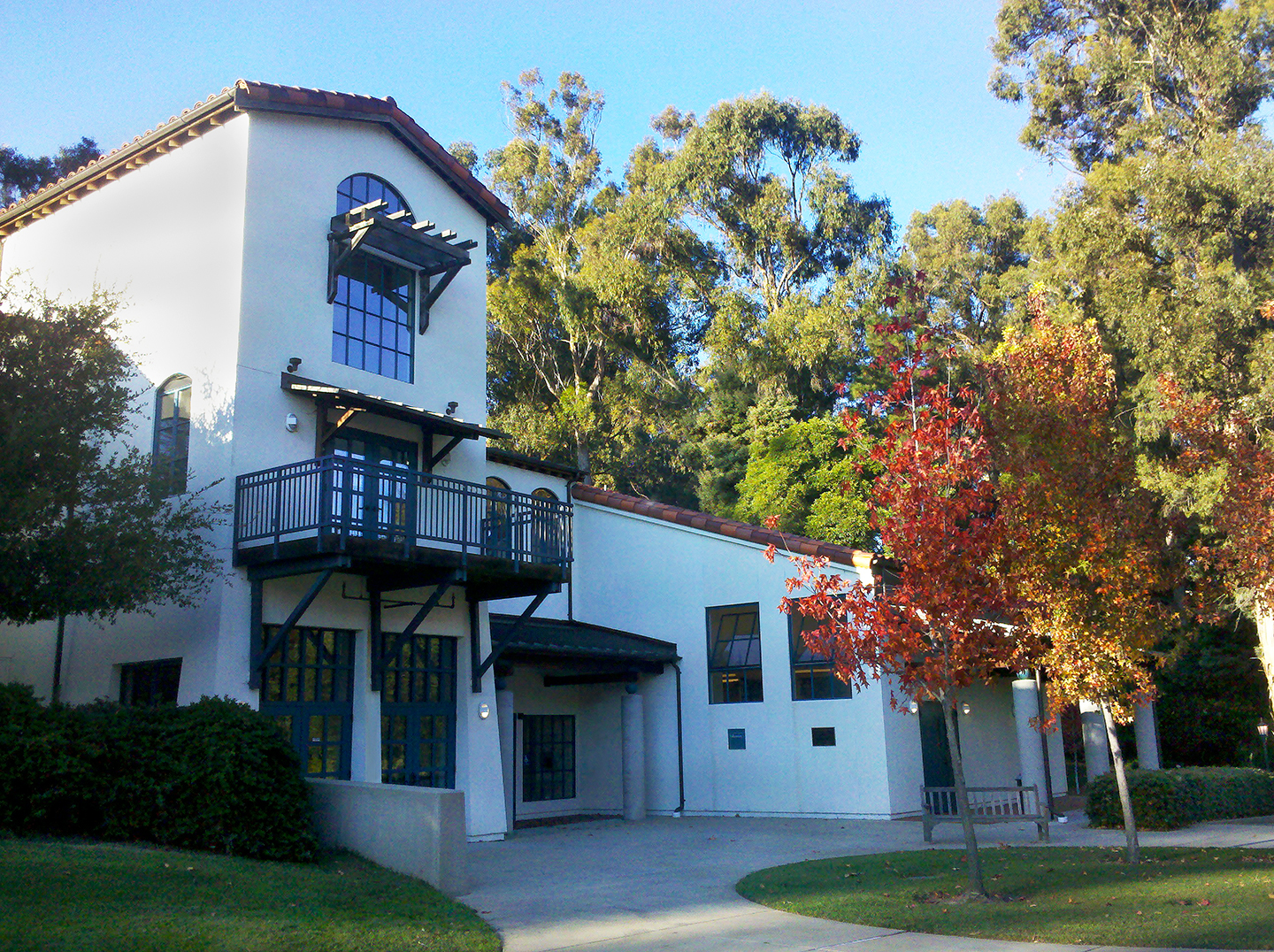
One of two graduate schools at Mills, the School of Education includes programs in early childhood education, teacher preparation, and educational leadership.

The School of Education houses the Mills College Children's School which opened in 1926 to provide students with opportunities to learn about child behavior and cognitive development. It was the first laboratory school on the West Coast. Today, the school offers programs for infants through fifth graders, and provides Mills students with the opportunity to study progressive educational practices that focus on the whole child. In the Children's School classrooms, Mills students observe developmentally, culturally, and linguistically responsive teaching, as well as a constructivist model of classroom learning and the integration of theory and practice. The Children's School has a dual mission of providing high-quality education to the approximately 135 students in its infant, preschool, and K–5 programs, as well as offering a collaborative research setting for undergraduate and graduate education students.

Programs in early childhood education, educational leadership, and teacher education are housed in the School of Education and utilize the Children's School.

==== Residential Halls ====
Ten on-campus living options are available at Mills, including traditional residence halls, a housing cooperative, family housing, and apartment living. Traditional residence halls include Ethel Moore, Lynn Townsend White, Mary Morse, Orchard Meadow and Warren Olney halls, which are located in different areas across the campus.

== See also ==
- List of Mills College people
- List of Mills College honorary degree recipients
- List of coordinate colleges
