= Aurelia Henry Reinhardt =

American educator and social activist

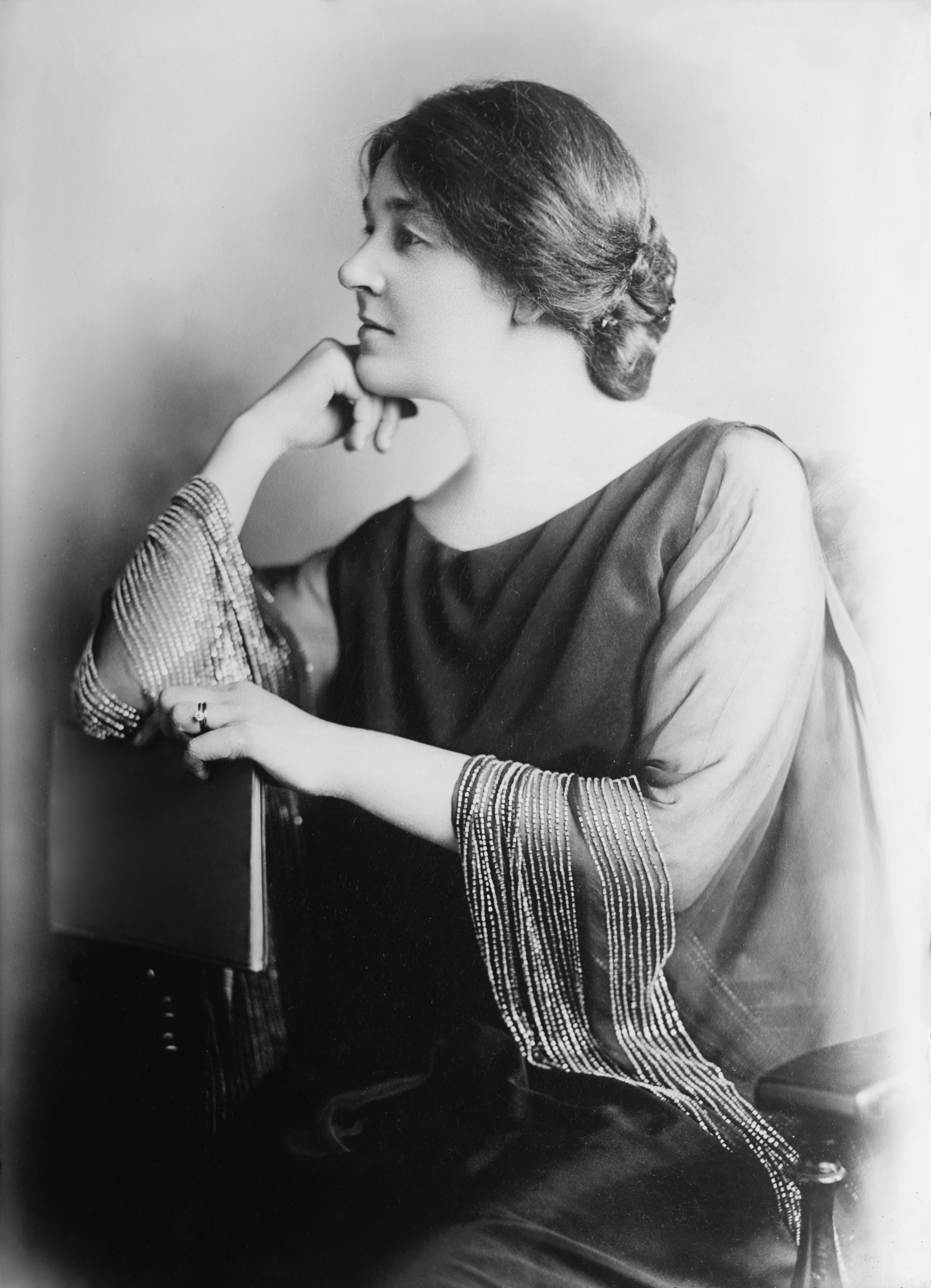
- Born: Aurelia Isabel Henry; April 1, 1877; San Francisco, California, US
- Died: January 28, 1948 (aged 70); Palo Alto, California, US
- Education: University of California, Berkeley (1898); Ph.D., Yale University (1905)
- Known for: President, Mills College, 1916–1943; Moderator, American Unitarian Association, 1940–1942
- Spouse: George Frederick Reinhardt
- Children: G. Frederick Reinhardt, Paul Henry Reinhardt

Signature
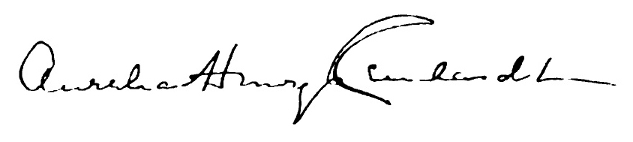

Aurelia Isabel Henry Reinhardt (April 1, 1877 – January 28, 1948) was an American educator, activist, and prominent member and leader of numerous organizations. She completed her undergraduate studies at the University of California, Berkeley, her doctoral dissertation at Yale, and studied as a fellow at Oxford. After teaching at the University of Idaho, the Lewiston State Normal School, and with the Extension Division of the University of California, Reinhardt was elected president of Mills College in 1916, and held the position until 1943, making her the longest serving president in the history of the school.

Reinhardt was a peace activist during the First World War, an active member of the Republican Party, and supported the ratification of the Treaty of Versailles as well as the formation of the League of Nations. She wrote and spoke extensively throughout the US and Europe, to a range of social, political and business groups, on topics including the education of women, women's suffrage, world peace, and international cooperation. Reinhardt was president of the American Association of University Women, and a prominent member of the American Unitarian Association, serving for two years as its first female moderator. As the only female member of the Unitarian Commission of Appraisal, she delivered the Ware Lecture in 1932, and was briefly a minister in Oakland, California. She was a director of the Starr King School for the Ministry, and was a delegate at the inaugural meeting of the United Nations in 1945.

Aurelia Henry Reinhardt was married to George F. Reinhardt in 1909. They had two sons, whom she raised after his unexpected death in 1914. Following her retirement in 1943, she traveled internationally before returning to California, where she died on January 28, 1948, due to heart problems. A lifelong advocate for the marginalized and dispossessed, she was the recipient of honorary degrees from a number of educational institutions, and has been commemorated through the establishment of a society, fellowship, a university building, and a professorship bearing her name. She was named nationally as "one of the ten outstanding women of 1940," and honored as the California State Mother in 1946.

== Early life ==
Aurelia Isabel Henry was born on April 1, 1877, in San Francisco, California. The second of six children, she was the daughter of Mary and William Warner Henry, a wholesale grocer, land owner, and businessman. She spent part of her childhood in San Jacinto and Escondido, California. After graduating from Boys High School in San Francisco in 1888, she studied at the University of California, Berkeley, completing a bachelor's degree with a major in English literature in 1898. While attending the University of California she, along with her sisters, worked with their mother who ran a boardinghouse in Berkeley. Henry then taught elocution and physical culture at the University of Idaho from 1898 to 1901.

She completed a Ph.D. in literature at Yale in 1905 with a doctoral dissertation on Epicoene, or the Silent Woman by Ben Jonson. (Note: One modern source from the Greenwich Historical Society records her as the first female doctoral graduate from Yale, while another from the Special Collections Department in the F.W. Olin Library at Mills College records her as "one of a handful of women to attend graduate school at Yale University". Yet another source says simply that it was "it was somewhat rare for a woman to be admitted to Yale at that time".) She taught at Lewiston State Normal School in Idaho (Note: Now Lewis–Clark State College) beginning in 1903, taking one year off to revise her dissertation for publication, and eventually becoming the head of the English Department. She traveled abroad as a recipient of an Association of Collegiate Alumnae Fellowship, studied as a fellow at the University of Oxford, traveled Italy, and published an English language translation of De Monarchia by Dante Alighieri. She then returned to teaching in Idaho for another three years. (Note: According to one source, she made plans to marry after returning to Idaho, but these were "thwarted" by her mother. Although no details are given.)

By 1908 her brother Paul had fallen ill, and she left her teaching position to care for him in Arizona, until his death in 1909. While there, she met and began a relationship with Paul's doctor, George F. Reinhardt, professor of hygiene, founder and director of the student health service at the University of California, Berkeley, and member of the California Board of Medical Examiners. The two were wed in 1909, in a ceremony at the Unitarian Universalist Church of Berkeley. He later died unexpectedly in 1914, following an "operation for a minor affliction" and four days of illness. (Note: At least one source records George Reinhardt's cause of death as "blood poisoning", possibly a reference to sepsis. Another modern source lists his cause of death as streptococcal infection.) They had two sons, who Aurelia Henry Reinhardt cared for alone following her husband's death.

== Career ==
Because wars are spreading over the planet, destroying men and their achievements, increased effort must be made to assure the development of intelligence and strengthening of character and to utilize every influence making for stability, justice, creativity, and that kind of dwelling together and working together which is crammed into the dynamic monosyllable peace. Universities are such an influence. Women might be.
—Aurelia Henry Reinhardt, Women in the American University, 1941

In 1914 Reinhardt became a lecturer in English in the Extension Division of the University of California. She was a member of the Town and Gown Club of Berkeley, Prytancan and English Club of the University of California, Phi Beta Kappa, the Dante Society of America, and Concordance Society of America. (Note: At least according to one contemporary source, "She is a life member of more literary organizations than probably any other woman of California.")

After two years of teaching she was appointed president of the then-struggling Mills College in Oakland, California, at that time the only women's college on the West Coast and the second oldest women's college in the country. Reinhardt succeeded acting president Hettie Belle Ege, who remained on the Mills faculty until 1930. Arriving with her two young children, Reinhardt is said to have remarked that she was "the first college president who arrived on campus pushing a perambulator". There she served from 1916 to 1943, through a period of substantial growth, making her the longest serving president in the institution's history. During her tenure Mills constructed 17 additional buildings (growing from 11 to 28 total), increased enrollment three-fold in 15 years, (Note: According to one source, Mills College had an enrollment of 153 in the 1915 to 1916 school-year, and that figure had risen to 624 by 1927 "and remained at this level twenty-nine years afterward.") and "gained national, even worldwide favor", including admission to the Association of American Colleges and Universities in 1917.

Reinhardt was active in local, national, and international organizations, lecturing and writing on topics including international cooperation, suffrage, and women's rights. In 1919 she served the Oakland Chamber of Commerce as chair of the City Planning Committee, and she was regularly invited to speak at a range of organizations, such as the Retail Furniture Association of California, the Western Fruit Jobbers Association, the San Francisco Chamber of Commerce, and the Advertising Club of Los Angeles.

Starting in the First World War, Reinhardt worked as an advocate for world peace. She supported Democratic President Woodrow Wilson's proposal to create the League of Nations, despite herself being active in the Republican Party. In 1920 she traveled to Washington, D.C. to deliver a petition of 30,000 signatures from Californians urging the ratification of the Treaty of Versailles to end the war. In total, she was a member of more than a dozen peace organizations over the course of her career.

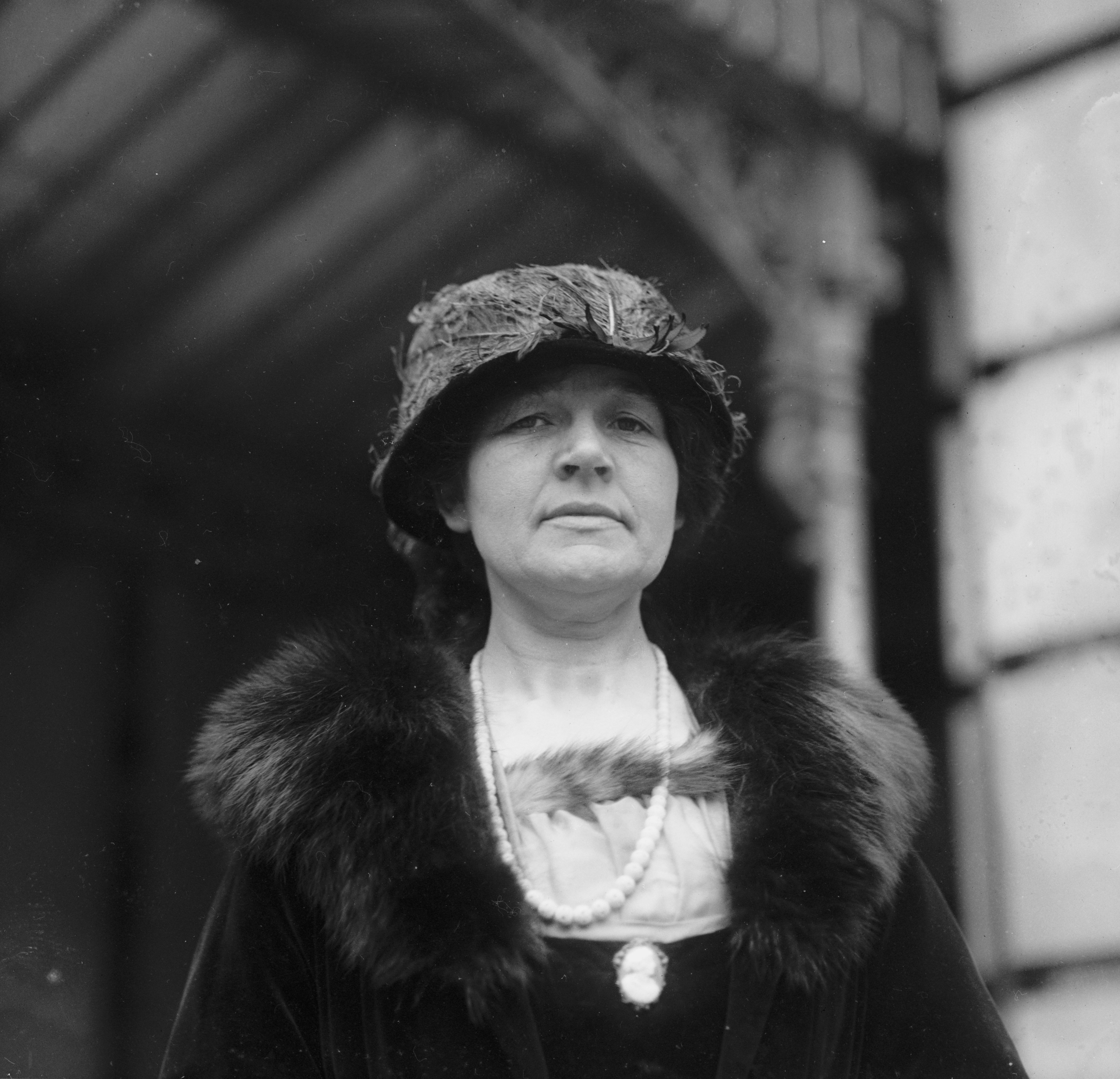
Reinhardt, c. 1919

In 1922 Reinhardt traveled again to Oxford and then to France as a representative of the American Association of University Women. She served as vice president, and then in 1923, president of the Association, a position she held until 1927, helping to strengthen that organization significantly. In 1928 she was a Republican elector from California, and opponent of Franklin D. Roosevelt's New Deal. She continued her work with the Association of University Women into the 1930s, as chair of their Committee on International Relations from 1927 to 1933, also held the chair for the General Federation of Women's Clubs in their Department of Education from 1928 to 1930. Then, during the 1936 presidential election, traveled as a delegate to the Republican National Convention. (Note: The source records her as being on the "Warren Ticket", possibly a reference to fellow Californian Earl Warren.) In 1929 she traveled to Kyoto, Japan for the third meeting of the Institute of Pacific Relations.

Reinhardt was a devoted and active Unitarian throughout her life. (Note: According to one source "despite her mother's Quaker faith") In the 1940s she served as the first female moderator of the American Unitarian Association from 1940 to 1942, which according to contemporary news reports was the first time a large church in the nation had been represented by a woman. Reinhardt served briefly as a minister at the First Unitarian Church of Oakland and delivered the Ware Lecture at the May 1932 meeting of the American Unitarian Association. She also served for a decade on the board of directors at the Starr King School for the Ministry. (Note: Then the Pacific Unitarian School for the Ministry) Reinhardt was the only woman member of the Unitarian Commission of Appraisal, commissioned to "study the church and find new directions for its re invigoration".

In 1945 Reinhardt was a delegate to the inaugural meeting of the United Nations in San Francisco, and spoke to numerous groups throughout the country, advocating for the value of organizations such as UNESCO.

Throughout her life, Reinhardt "invariably took the side of those individuals who had no resources, who lacked adequate support, or who had in some other way been marginalized by society." She has also been described as an "avid nature lover", and advocated variously for environmental preservation efforts, and against unchecked and reckless development.

== Later life and death ==
Following her retirement as president of Mills College in 1943, Reinhardt traveled in Latin America, Europe, and finally Russia before returning to California. She died on January 28, 1948, in Palo Alto, California, from heart problems. Her ashes are interred at the Columbarium in Oakland. Her eldest son, G. Frederick Reinhardt, was a diplomat. His brother Paul Henry Reinhardt, an ophthalmologist in Palo Alto, served with the U.S. Navy in the Pacific Theater of the Second World War and later taught ophthalmology at Stanford University.

== Recognition and commemoration ==
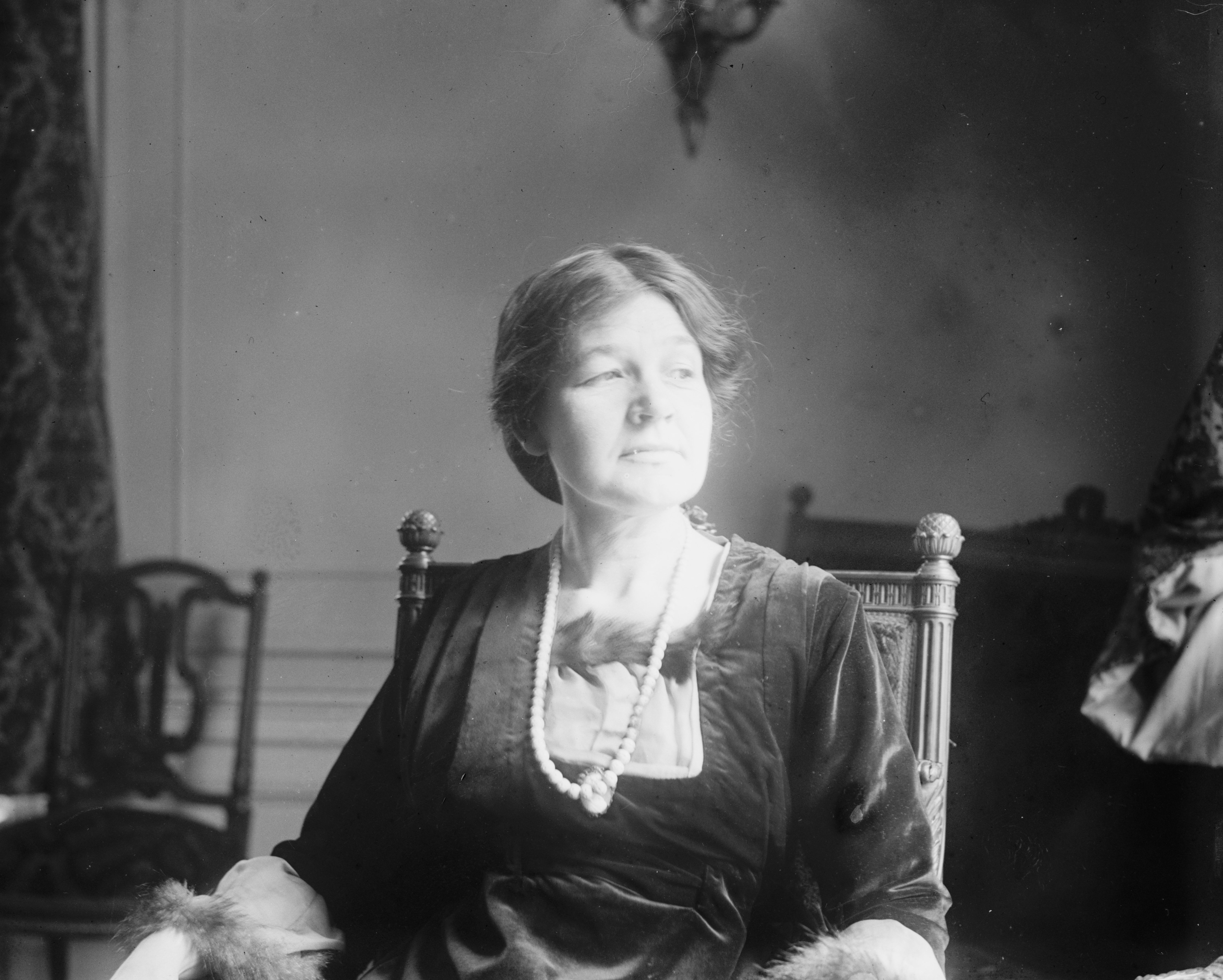
Reinhardt in academic regalia from a 1922 publication

Reinhardt was the recipient of multiple honorary degrees, including from:

- The University of California (1919)
- The University of Southern California (1924)
- Colorado College (1931)
- Williams College (1937)
- Mount Holyoke College (1937)
- Oberlin College (1937)

Mills College hosts the namesake Aurelia Henry Reinhardt Society, which recognizes those who financially support the college through a bequest or other charitable gift, as well as the Aurelia Henry Reinhardt Faculty Purse, awarded to seniors to support post-graduate study. The school's campus also includes the Aurelia Henry Reinhardt Alumnae House, designed by architect Clarence W. W. Mayhew and built in 1949.

The Aurelia Henry Reinhardt Fellowship was established in 1940 with fundraising from the South Pacific section of the American Association of University Women and is offered annually to distinguished women scholars. In 1981 the Starr King School for the Ministry introduced the Aurelia Henry Reinhardt Professorship, in order to "ensure a feminist perspective on the faculty". (Note: Although the Starr King school itself has this professorship founded in 1981, at least one source from the Unitarian Universalist Women's Heritage Society places the date instead as 1977.)

The archives at Mills College hosts the Reinhardt Collection, a compilation of texts related to "women, with a strength in women’s suffrage, birth control, and social issues", and the school also includes the student run Aurelia Reinhardt Historical Society, established to "inspire an appreciation of the history of the Mills community".

Reinhardt was named "one of the ten outstanding women of 1940" by the publication American Women. She was also selected as the California State Mother in 1946, by the American Mothers Committee of the Golden Rule Foundation. (Note: The American Mothers Committee was established by the charitable Golden Rule Foundation in 1933, during the Great Depression. The Foundation "provided relief for poor children and dependent mothers when public assistance was scarce or unavailable" and established the Mothers Committee to "draw the attention of Americans to the plight of poor unemployed mothers and their children". They used the Mother of the Year contest as a vehicle to draw public attention to the importance of motherhood. Eligibility was determined not only by a dedication to raising children, but also "moral qualities such as courage, moral strength, patience, affection, kindness, and understanding [and] a sense of civic and international understanding," including active service in the interest of "community betterment [and] public benefit.")

In 2019, the Redwood Regional Park in the San Francisco Bay Area was renamed Dr. Aurelia Reinhardt Redwood Regional Park in honor of her efforts in helping to establish the East Bay Regional Park District.

== Selected publications ==
- Henry Reinhardt, Aurelia (1929). "Colleges for Women and Education for Peace". Proceedings of the Institute of International Relations. 4: 222.
- Henry Reinhardt, Aurelia (July 13, 2012) [First published 1904]. De Monarchia of Dante Aligheri (translation). Houghton Mifflin Harcourt. ISBN 978-1478240297. OCLC 982936819.
- Jonson, Ben (1906). Henry Reinhardt, Aurelia (ed.). Epicoene, or the Silent Woman. OCLC 257568261.
- Henry Reinhardt, Aurelia (1921). "Education of the Women of the United States". International Education Association: Addresses and Proceedings. 59: 65–74.
- Henry Reinhardt, Aurelia (1928). "Opportunities Girl Scouting Offers College Women for Volunteer Leadership". Girl Scouts, Inc.
- Henry Reinhardt, Aurelia (1935). The Garden Club of America's Redwood Grove. Eucalyptus Press. OCLC 9025272.
- Henry Reinhardt, Aurelia (July 1936). "Looking Toward Tomorrow". American Journal of Nursing. 36 (7): 673–676. doi:10.2307/3412652. JSTOR 3412652. OCLC 7351253059.
- Henry Reinhardt, Aurelia (1946). "What Price Peace?". The San Francisco Conference and the United Nations: Proceedings of the Institute of World Affairs. 21. University of Southern California: 131–139.
- Henry Reinhardt, Aurelia (1936). Worship: Its Fundamental Place in Liberal Religion. Unitarian Association. pp. 70–79.

== See also ==
- Aurelia Harwood (1865–1928), Reinhardt's first cousin and the first female president of the Sierra Club
- List of Mills College honorary degree recipients
- List of presidents of Mills College
- List of women's firsts
- List of women's rights activists
- Women's education in the United States
- Mary Emma Woolley (1863–1947), president of Mount Holyoke College, who succeeded Reinhardt as president of the American Association of University Women

== Notes ==
Academic offices
| Preceded by Luella Clay Carson | President of Mills College; 1916–1943 | Succeeded by Lynn Townsend White Jr. |
