= List of presidents of Mills College =

The following is a list of presidents of Mills College.

	President	Life	Tenure	Events
1.	Cyrus Taggart Mills		1865–1884	
2.	Homer Baxter Sprague		1885–1887	
3.	Charles Carroll Stratton		1887–1890	
4.	Susan Tolman Mills		1890–1909	
5.	Luella Clay Carson		1909–1914	
6.	Hettie Belle Ege		1914–1916	
7.	Aurelia Henry Reinhardt		1916–1943	
8.	Lynn Townsend White, Jr.		1943–1958	
9.	Charles Easton Rothwell		1959–1967	
10.	Robert Joseph Wert		1967–1976	
11.	Barbara McClure White		1976–1980	
12.	Mary S. Metz		1981–1990	
13.	Janet L. Holmgren		1991–2011	
14.	Alecia A. DeCoudreaux		2011–2016	
15.	Beth Hillman (beginning Fall 2016)		2016–	
