= UC Berkeley Extension =

Extension school of the University of California, Berkeley

Coordinates: 37.8721°N 122.2713°W

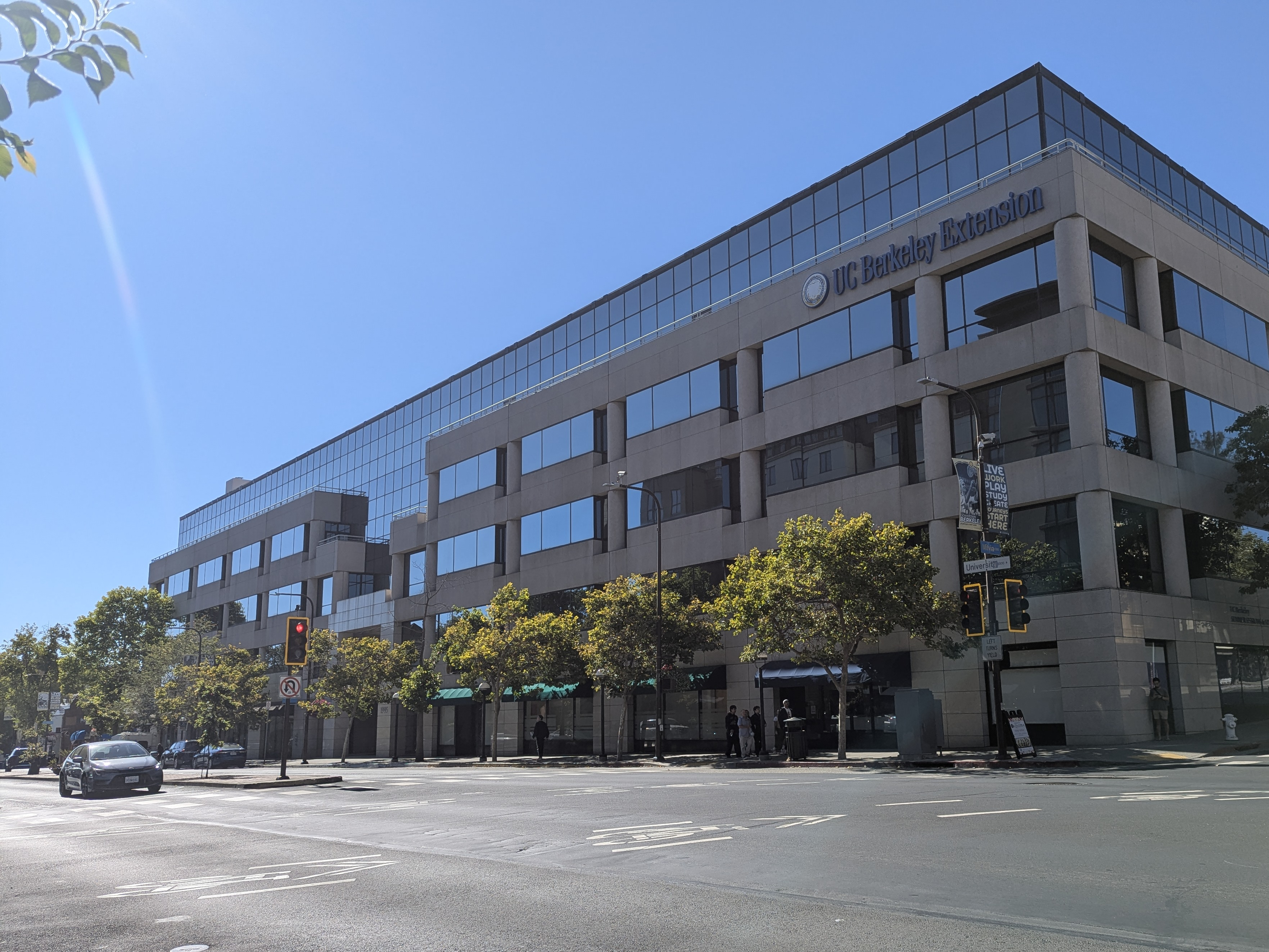
- Golden Bear Center
- Type: Public
- Established: 1891
- Dean: Richard (Rick) Russo
- Location: Berkeley, California, USA
- Campus: Urban, College town
- Website: https://extension.berkeley.edu/

The University of California, Berkeley Extension (UC Berkeley Extension) is the continuing education division of the University of California, Berkeley (UC Berkeley) campus. Founded in 1891, UC Berkeley Extension provides continuing education through self-supporting academic programs.

The extension is headquartered outside the main UC Berkeley campus in Berkeley, California, with classrooms in downtown San Francisco and other Bay Area locations. UC Berkeley Extension serves more than 48,000 annual student enrollments in over 2,000 courses and 80 programs.

Through UC Berkeley, UC Berkeley Extension is accredited by the Western Association of Schools and Colleges.

== History ==
In 1891, three UC professors began offering courses in San Francisco in history (Prof. Bacon), mathematics (Prof. Stringham) and English literature (Prof. Gayley). On February 14, 1893, UC Berkeley's Regents adopted the extramural instruction plan and authorized extension courses to be taught in California.

In 1902, the University Extension became a self-organizing body within UC Berkeley and Henry Morse Stephens was appointed Director of University Extension.

In 1912, Ira W. Howerth was appointed Director. Howerth established a district organization to further extend the University Extension's reach to communities outside of Berkeley.

After receiving a legislative appropriation to support University Extension in 1915, the extension began offering classes in Southern California. In 1917, Leon J. Richardson was appointed Director. During his tenure, Richardson standardized academic work at the extension.

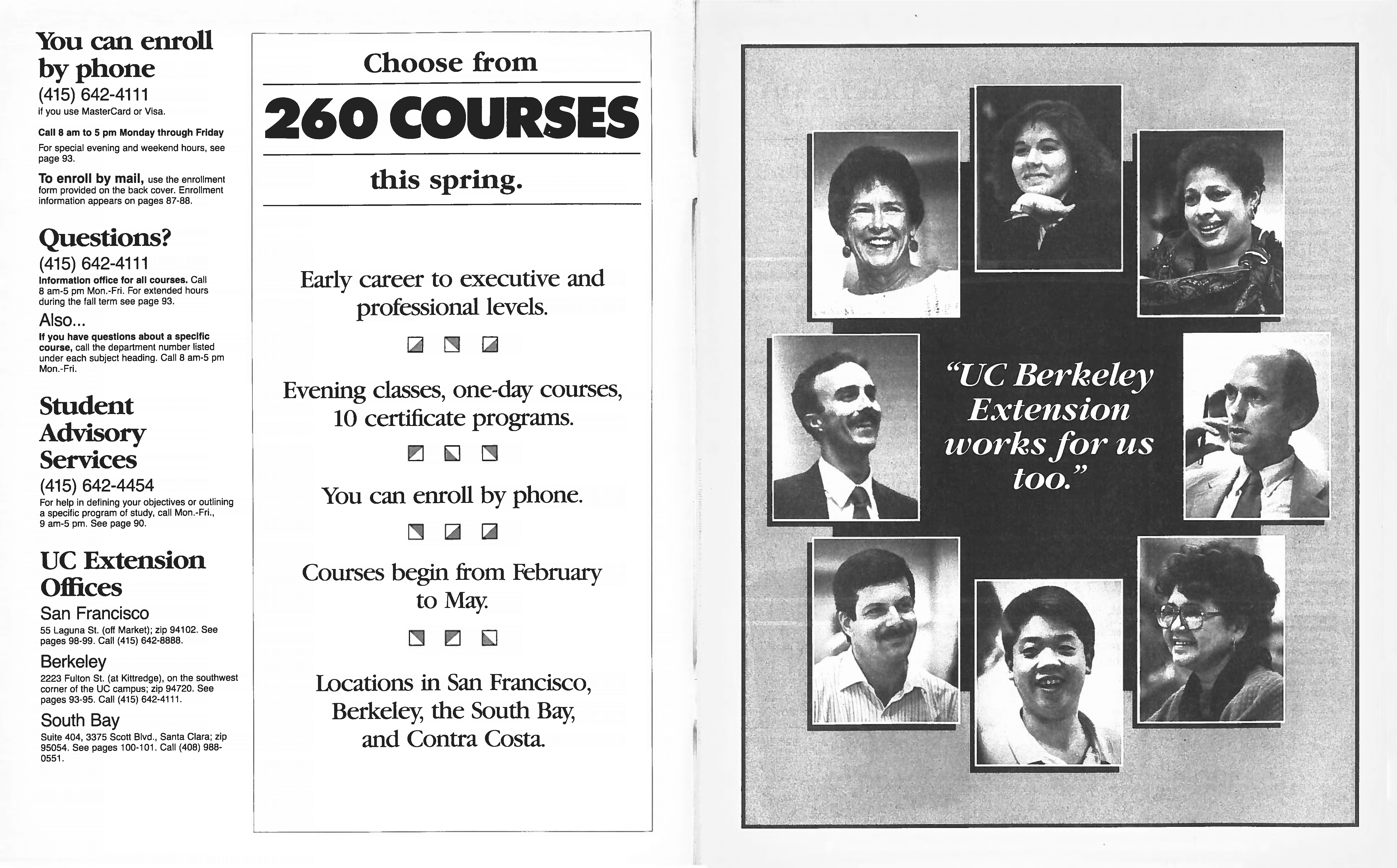
1980s course advertisement

During World War II and the postwar era, Director Baldwin Woods changed the extension's coursework from only offering degree courses to also offering courses in subjects such as the sciences, business, and industry. Woods also authorized the extension to train women for defense jobs during wartime.

Mary S. Metz was appointed Dean of University Extension in 1991. Metz oversaw the implementation of online learning at the extension for the first time. In 1996, UC Berkeley Extension Online was developed in collaboration with the extension's Center for Media and Independent Learning.

In 2007, the UC Berkeley Extension offered their first bilingual classes in Chinese and Mandarin. In 2008, Diana Wu was appointed Dean of the UC Berkeley Extension. In 2012, Wu was also appointed as the first executive director of the Berkeley Resource Center for Online Education (BRCOE) after the extension created the new division.

== Academics ==
UC Berkeley Extension offers more than 2,000 courses yearly. UC Berkeley Extension also offers professional certificate programs for students who already have a college education. Areas of study include business, technology and information management, STEM, industry, humanities, health, and law.

== Locations ==
UC Berkeley Extension's classes take place in several locations including the Golden Bear Building in Berkeley since 1995, 160 Spear Street in San Francisco, and Cañada College in Redwood City.

Previously, the extension had also offered classes in the Hayes Valley neighborhood of San Francisco after purchasing a building from San Francisco State College. Other previous locations include San Francisco's South of Market Center, Powell Street in San Francisco, Fremont, and Belmont.
