= Barbara White =

Barbara White may refer to:

- Barbara M. White (1920–1984), American diplomat
- Barbara White (actress) (1923–2013), British actress
- Barbara White (composer) (born 1965), American composer
- Barbara Fay White, American golfer
