= Monarchia =

1312 Latin treatise by Dante Alighieri

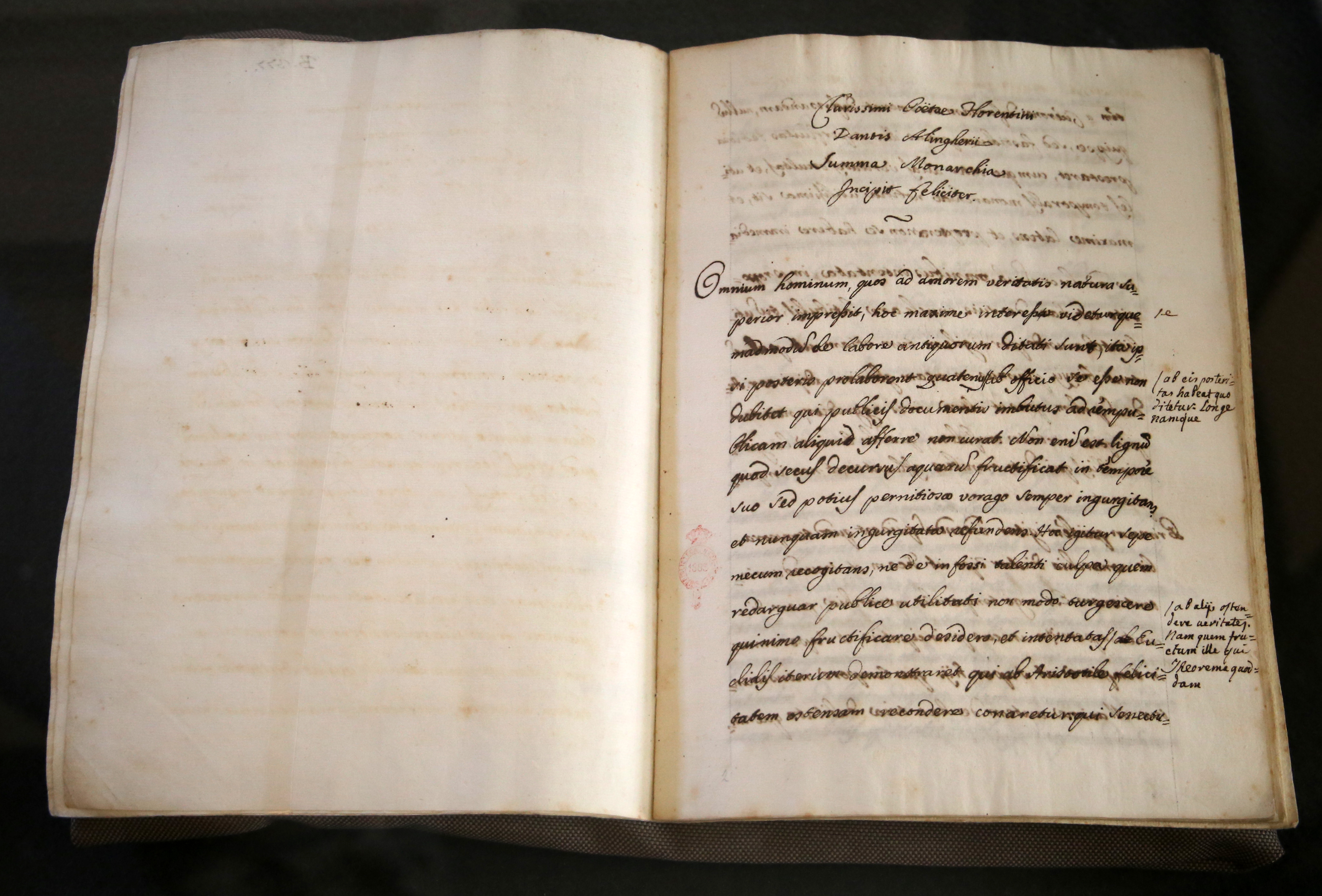
Monarchia (1700-50s)

Monarchia, often called De Monarchia (Classical Latin: [deː mɔˈnarkʰɪ.aː], Ecclesiastical Latin: [dɛ moˈnarkja]; "(On) Monarchy"), is a Latin treatise on secular and religious power by Dante Alighieri, who wrote it between 1312 and 1313. With this text, the poet intervened in one of the most controversial subjects of his period: the relationship between secular authority (represented by the Holy Roman Emperor) and religious authority (represented by the Pope). Dante's point of view was known on this problem, since during his political activity he had fought to defend the autonomy of the city-government of Florence from the temporal demands of Pope Boniface VIII. The work was banned by the Catholic Church in 1585.

== Title and date ==
The title found in the extant Dante manuscripts and the editio princeps is simply Monarchia. Michele Barbi pointed this out in his introduction to the 1921 centenary edition and urged editors to adopt it. Prue Shaw has urged likewise, and done so herself, since 1995, explaining how the mistake of 'de' has come about.

According to most accepted chronologies, Monarchia was composed in the years 1312–13, around the time of Henry VII of Luxembourg's journey to Italy. According to others, however, the date of composition has to be brought back to at least 1308 or moved forward to 1318, shortly before the author's death in 1321.

== Argument ==
Monarchia is made up of three books; the first looks at the necessity of Universal Empire, the second looks at the right of the Romans to imperial authority, and the third looks at how God had given authority to the Romans without the mediation of the Church.

In the third book, Dante most explicitly confronts the subject of relations between the pope and the emperor. Dante first condemns the hierocratic conception of the pope's power elaborated by the Roman Church with the theory of the Sun and the Moon and solemnly confirmed by the papal bull Unam sanctam of 1302. The hierocratic conception assigned all power to the pope, making his authority superior to that of the emperor: this meant that the pope could legitimately intervene in matters usually regarded as secular.

Against this hierocratic conception, Dante argued a need for another strong power, the Holy Roman emperor, proposing that man pursues two ends: the happiness of earthly life and of eternal life. Dante argued that the pope is assigned the management of men's eternal life (the higher of the two), but the emperor the task of leading men towards earthly happiness. From this he distinguishes the autonomy of the temporal sphere under the emperor from the spiritual sphere under the pope—the pontiff's authority should not influence that of the emperor in his tasks.

Dante wanted to demonstrate that the Holy Roman emperor and the pope were both human and that both derived their power and authority directly from God. To understand this, it is necessary to think that man is the only thing to occupy an intermediate position between corruptibility and incorruptibility. If it is considered that man is made up of only two parts, that is to say the soul and the body, only in regard to the soul is he incorruptible. Man, then, has the function of uniting corruptibility with incorruptibility. The pope and emperor were both human, and no peer had power over another peer. Only a higher power could judge the two "equal swords", as each was given power by God to rule over his respective domain.

== English editions ==
An English translation by Frederick William Church was published in 1878, in Dante, an essay by his father, Richard William Church. A second translation by Philip Wicksteed was printed for private circulation in 1896 and by The Temple Classics in London in 1904. In 1904, Aurelia Henry Reinhardt provided a new translation published by Cambridge University Press. A translation by Donald Nicholl titled Monarchy and Three Political Letters was published in 1954 in London by Weidenfeld and Nicolson and in 1955 in New York by The Noonday Press. Prue Shaw's translation was published in 1995, and in 2004 the Catholic University of America Press published Anthony K. Cassell's The Monarchia Controversy: An Historical Study with Accompanying Translations of Dante Alighieri's Monarchia, Guido Vernani's Refutation of the "Monarchia" Composed by Dante, and Pope John XXII Bull Si fratrum.

== See also ==
- Separation of church and state
- List of authors and works on the Index Librorum Prohibitorum
