= Sun and Moon allegory =

Medieval Analogy-Theorie concerning an alleged Papal Supremacy

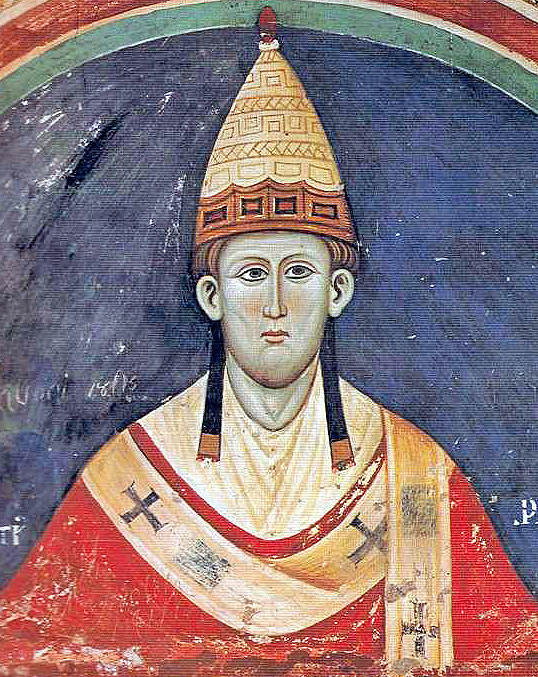
Portrait of Pope Innocent III

The Sun and Moon allegory is used to depict a medieval political theory of hierocracy which submits the secular power to the spiritual power, stating that the Bishop of Rome is like the Sun, the only source of his own light, while the Emperor is like the Moon, which merely reflects lights and has no value without the Sun. It was espoused by the Catholic Church of Innocent III and instantiated to some extent in medieval political practice. It was among the first ambitions of papal domination of Europe.

== Description ==
Finding this imagery in the Book of Genesis, the Allegory images authentic spiritual authority as the Sun and any and all civil, or political or secular, authority as the Moon. By doing so, it illustrates that the Roman Catholic Pope, as "Supreme Pontiff", "Vicar of Christ", et cetera, and therefore the supreme universal spiritual authority on Earth, is like the Sun that is the one source of light for itself and all other celestial bodies orbiting it; while the Holy Roman Emperor, as symbolic and intended supreme civil, political, and secular authority on Earth, and having theoretically received his authority from and at the pleasure of the Pope, is like the Moon – that is, dependent upon the Sun for any illumination, merely reflects solar light, and ultimately has no light without the Sun. This theory dominated European political theory and practice in the 13th century. It is related to the general theory of Papal supremacy and "plenitudo potestatis" as articulated by the Roman Catholic Church.

LETTER OF INNOCENT III re-affirming primacy of the Pope's authority over civil powers. November 3, 1198:

To the noble man Acerbus and to the other leaders of Tuscany and of the Duchy.

Just as God, founder of the universe, has constituted two large luminaries in the firmament of Heaven, a major one to dominate the day and a minor one to dominate the night, so he has established in the firmament of the Universal Church, which is signified by the name of Heaven, two great dignities, a major one to preside—so to speak—over the days of the souls, and a minor one to preside over the nights of the bodies. They are the Pontifical authority and the royal power. Thus, as the moon receives its light from the sun and for this very reason is minor both in quantity and in quality, in its size and in its effect, so the royal power derives from the Pontifical authority the splendour of its dignity, the more of which is inherent in it, the less is the light with which it is adorned, whereas the more it is distant from its reach, the more it benefits in splendour. Both these powers or leaderships have had their seat established in Italy, which country consequently obtained the precedence over all provinces by Divine disposition. And therefore, as it is lawful that we should extend the watchfulness of our providence to all provinces, we must especially and with paternal solicitude provide for Italy where the foundation of the Christian religion has been set up and where the pre-eminence of the priesthood and kingship stands prominent through the primacy of the Apostolic See.

We therefore admonish and exhort you all in the Lord through this Apostolic letter, enjoining that since you receive a true and firm assurance from us who—as it is fitting for the Apostolic dignity—intend to do more for you than we want to promise, you should always endeavour to act in a way which would add to the honour and growth of the Roman Church so as to deserve and strengthen the pledge of her favour and friendship.

In 1215, this concept was reflected in Canon 3 of the Fourth Lateran Council regarding heretics:

... if a temporal ruler, after having been requested and admonished by the Church, should neglect to cleanse his territory of this heretical foulness, let him be excommunicated by the metropolitan and the other bishops of the province. If he refuses to make satisfaction within a year, let the matter be made known to the supreme pontiff, that he may declare the ruler's vassals absolved from their allegiance and may offer the territory to be ruled by Catholics, who on the extermination of the heretics may possess it without hindrance and preserve it in the purity of faith; the right, however, of the chief ruler is to be respected as long as he offers no obstacle in this matter and permits freedom of action.

While this theory of papal sovereignty in temporal as well as spiritual matters was, by the fourteenth century, generally rejected as out-of-date, it entered into canon law and was reinforced by the Allegory of the Two Swords in the bull of Pope Boniface VIII entitled Unam Sanctam. Dante Alighieri argued contrarily to the Allegory of the Sun and Moon in his De Monarchia. In this work, he explicitly rejects the allegory of the sun and the moon, and defends that the Emperor is the supreme authority on secular matters, while the Pope is the supreme authority in spiritual matters, none of them having precedence or supremacy over the other. For some time, the work was placed on the Index due to this heterodox conception of Catholic politics.

== Bibliography ==
- The Decretals of Pope Gregory 9.

== See also ==
- Dante Alighieri
- De Monarchia
- Giles of Rome
- Papal supremacy
- Pope Boniface VIII
- Pope Innocent III
- Unam Sanctam
