= Abraham Feller =

American lawyer and government official

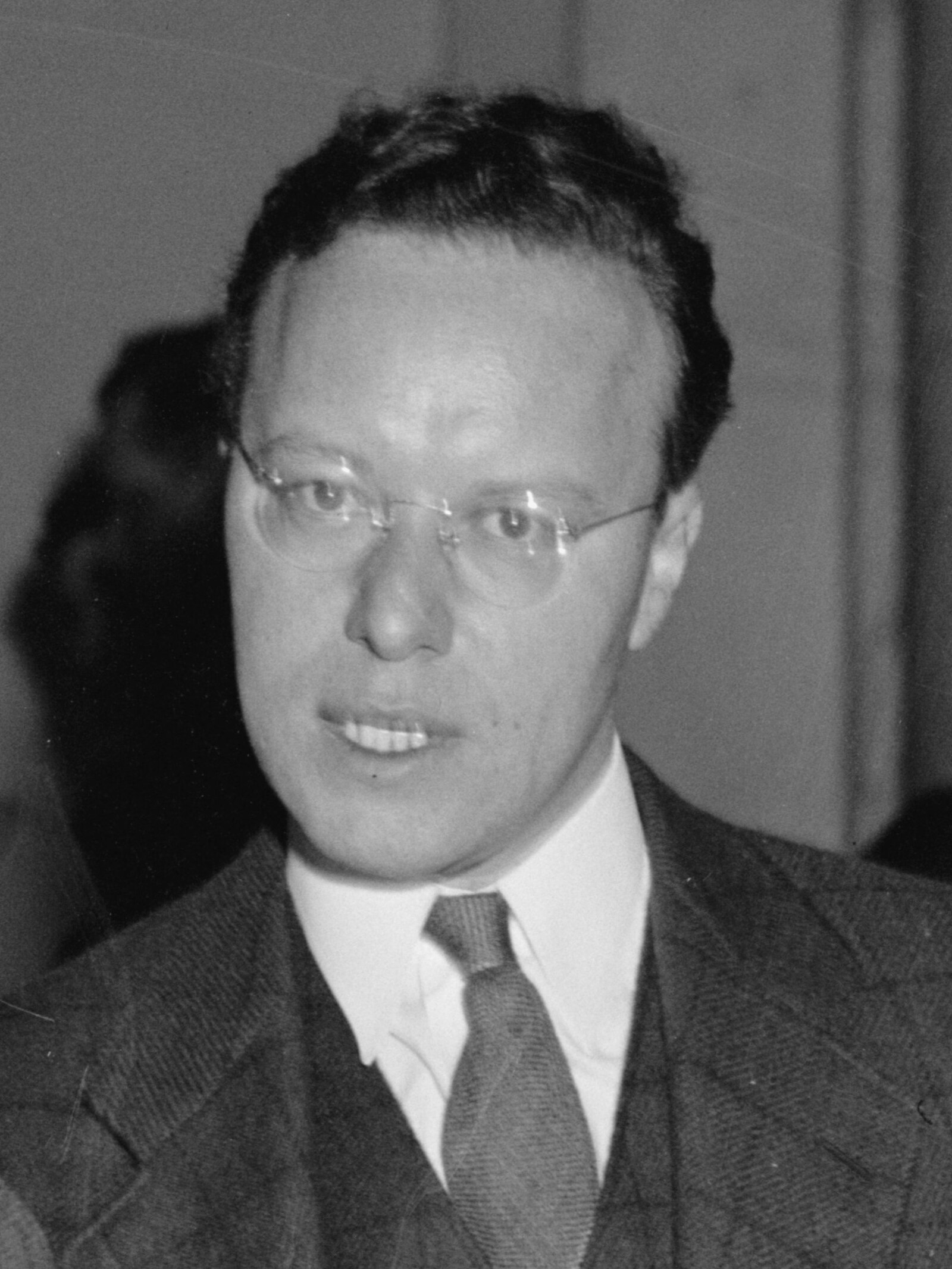
Feller in 1940

Abraham Howard Feller (1904 – November 13, 1952) was the chief legal counsel under Trygve Lie of the United Nations and a friend of Alger Hiss who committed suicide during investigations into communist subversion at the UN by the U.S. Senate Internal Security Subcommittee (SISS).

== Background ==
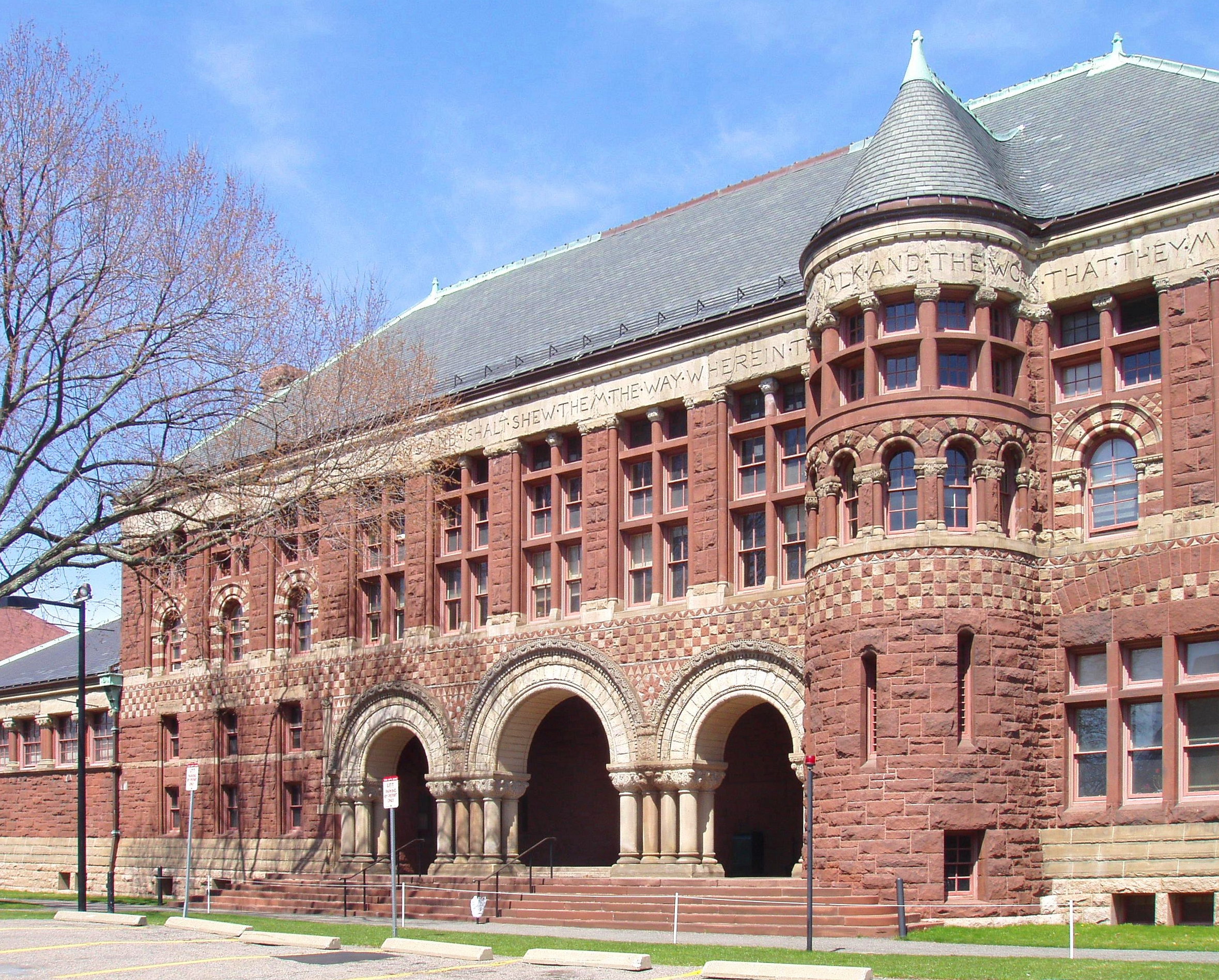
Austin Hall at Harvard Law School, where Feller studied

Feller was born in 1904 in New York City. He graduated from Columbia University in 1925, Phi Beta Kappa. At Columbia, he was classmates with future Federal Reserve chairman Arthur F. Burns and critic Lionel Trilling. In 1928, he graduated from Harvard Law School (a year ahead of Alger Hiss and Lee Pressman–and, like them, an editor of the Harvard Law Review).

== Career ==
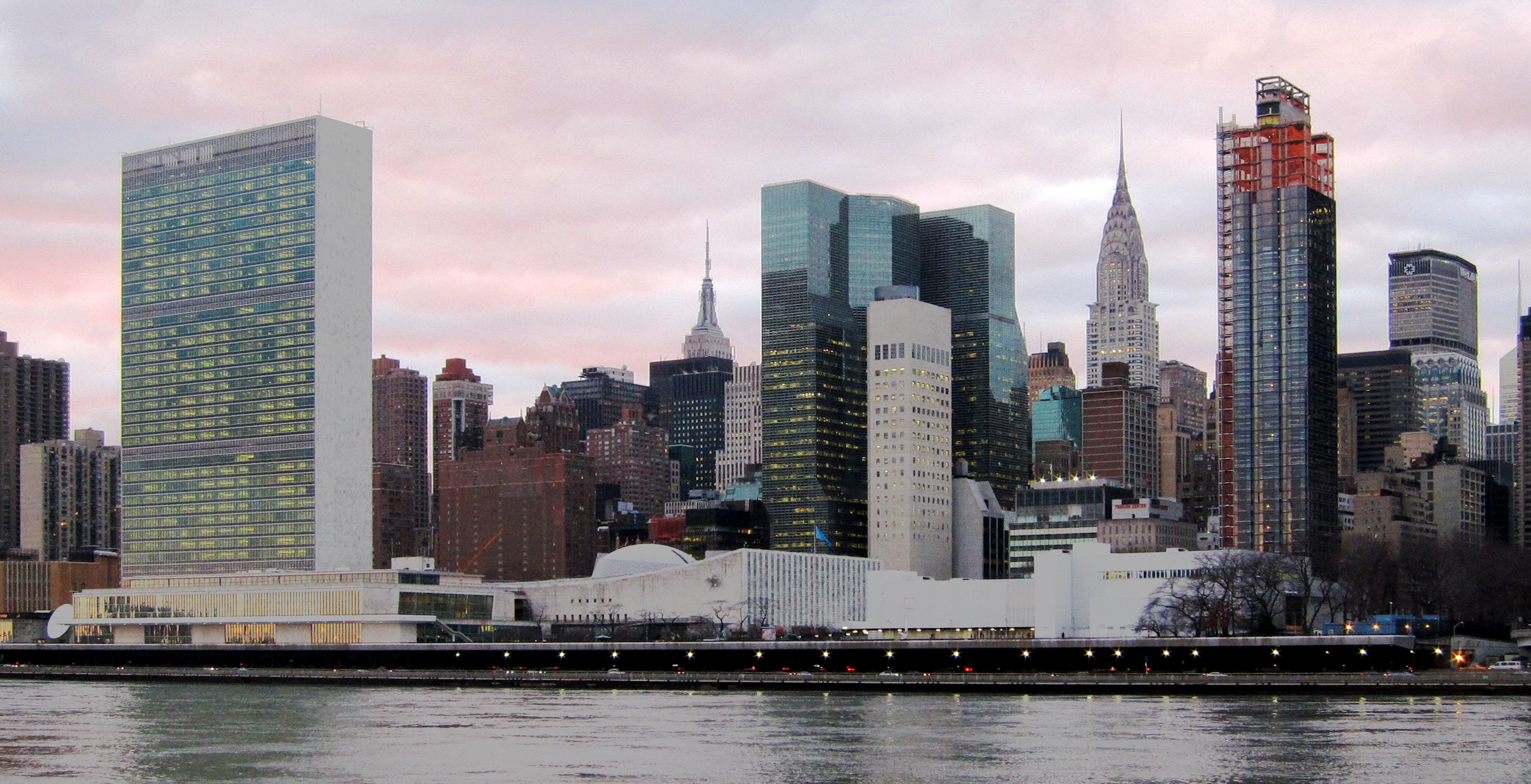
United Nations Headquarters in New York City, where Feller worked

In 1932 to 1933, Feller taught at Harvard Law School.

In the 1930s New Deal and the 1940s, Feller had served the federal government in Washington, DC. He was a member of Franklin Roosevelt's "Brain Trust."

In the fall of 1938, Feller was an American Labor Party candidate in New York City, as was Bella Dodd (and John F. O'Donnell for the Socialist Party of America).

In 1946, Feller joined the United Nations during its formation in London as legal counsel and policy adviser. He contributed to the drafting of the UN charter, as did Charles Easton Rothwell. At the time, he was working closely with Hiss.

The June 7, 1950, Congressional Record states:

In addition to the three Assistant Secretaries-General, Lie appointed pro-Soviet Abraham Feller as General Counsel and Director of the Legal Department of the United Nations Secretariat. Feller's Russian sympathies are well known to his associates. He has been a member of the Committee of International Law of the Nation[al] Lawyers Guild, which was repudiated as Communist-controlled by such liberal attorneys as Frank P. Walsh, Morris Ernst, Ferdinand Pecora, and Robert Jackson. Feller was also a member of the Washington Committee for Democratic Action, which defended civil-service employees charged with subversive activities and was itself cited as subversive by Attorney General Francis Biddle.

As general counsel and principal director of the Legal Department of the United Nations Secretariat," Feller headed a 52-person legal team. He served as liaison between the UN and U.S. congressional committees investigating communist subversion in government. A States Department report dated January 17, 1951, states:

Subject: McCarran Act1—Possible Conflict with Headquarters Agreement
In conversation with Abe Feller in New York recently he expressed the view that the regulations which have been issued under the McCarran Act make it fairly clear to him that there is likely to be some conflict between that Act and the way in which it is being interpreted and the Headquarters Agreement. He expressed the view that in the event of such conflict the UN secretariat would be forced to resort to the arbitration procedure under the Agreement. He stated he thought this would be very unfortunate and wondered whether any consideration was being given to a general amendment to the McCarran Act which would waive its provisions so far as it conflicted with international obligations or international agreements. I told him I did not know whether any amendments were under consideration but that I would bring his view to your attention.

Feller's appointment as chief legal counsel had upset the communist press:

Pravda, in an article published Feb, 21, 1951, said that Mr. Feller decided all matters in the legal department and that Mr. Feller and Andrew W. Cordier, Mr. Lie's executive assistant, were "agents of the American State Department" and "American stooges" who "plan in the machinery of the Secretariat various behind-the-scene actions connected with the American aggression in Korea."

Time magazine also reported that Feller was under no suspicion himself–and that the US hearings had "uncovered 17 among the 2,000 Americans on the UN staff who refused to say whether or not they have engaged in subversive activities." However, according to Feller's grand-nephew, he had received a subpoena from Roy Cohn to appear before the SISS. Weeks before his death, he had become acting Assistant Secretary General of the UN.

== Personal life and death ==
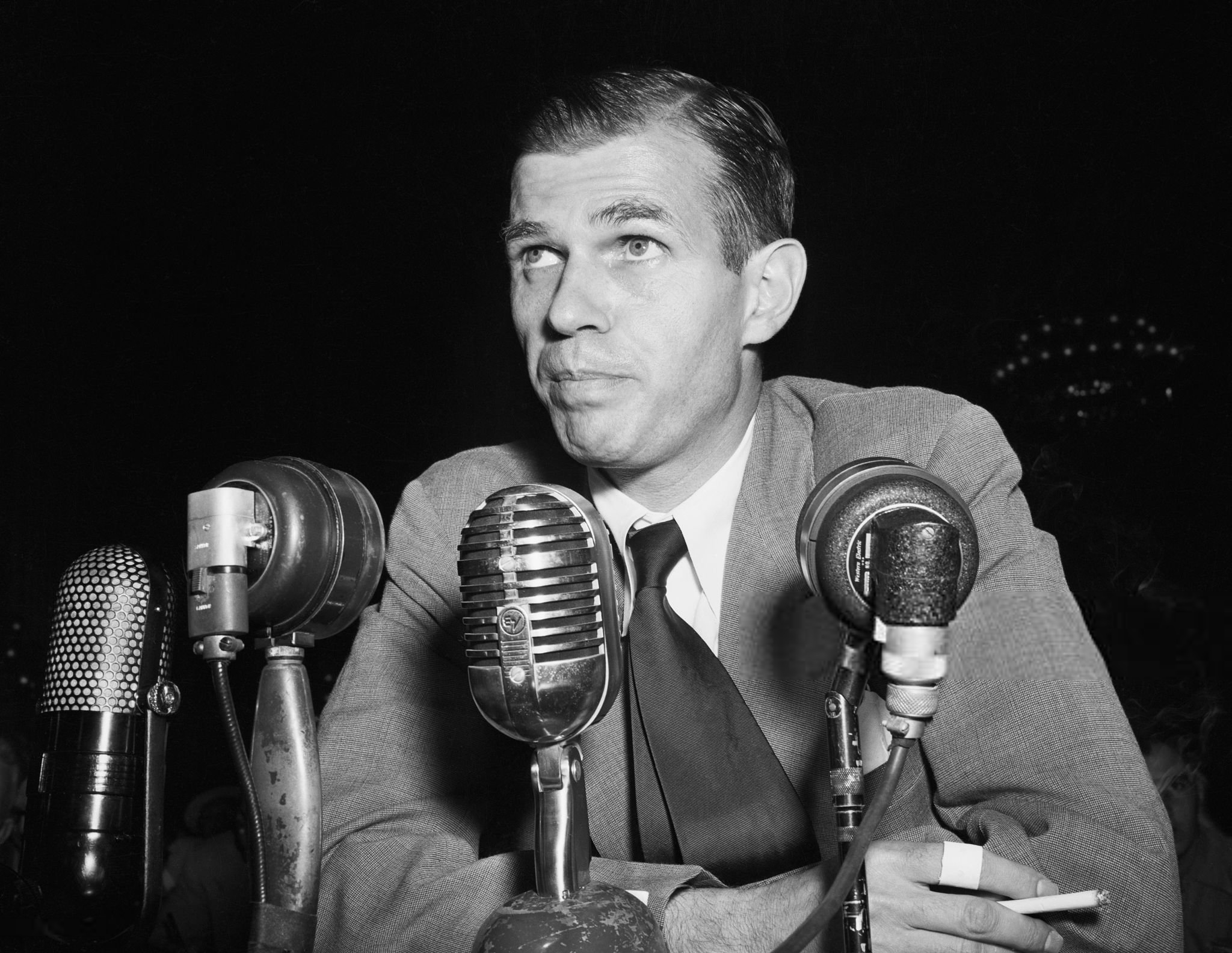
Alger Hiss (1948) was a friend of Feller's from Harvard

Feller was "reportedly" a "close friend" of Alger Hiss. At the time of Feller's suicide, Hiss was already convicted of perjury in 1950 based on communism-related charges.

On November 13, 1952, at 47, Feller committed suicide by jumping out of the window of his 12th-floor apartment in New York City.

Secretary General Trygve Lie blamed "indiscriminate smears" from the McCarran committee. Lie said that Feller could not take the strain of investigations by a U.S. grand jury and the SISS. "But what depressed Feller most were the problems and pressures that had been laid on the U.N. in recent months by a Federal grand jury and the McCarran Senate subcommittee, in their investigation of subversive Americans on the U.N. Secretariat." His wife said he had suffered a "nervous breakdown brought on by overwork."

According to a source unidentified by The New York Times, two recent events had depressed Feller: the defeat of Illinois governor Adlai Stevenson Jr. and the resignation of Secretary General Lie.

The Fellers had one daughter. Writer Peter Birkenhead is his great-nephew.

== Aftermath ==
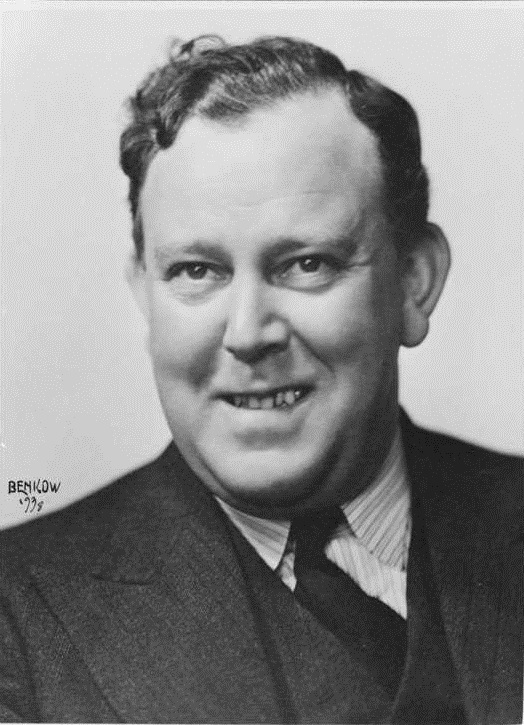
Trygve Lie (1938)

Lie characterized Feller's death as an "irreparable loss to the United Nations and to me personally."

Feller's wife said of him, "He was an idealist, and his whole life was devoted to the United Nations."

Ralph Bunche, the director of the "Department of Trusteeship" for the United Nations, "denounced Americans who bring pressure upon the United Nations as unable to understand that such an international body cannot serve the exclusive national interests of any member state". Dr. Bunche was alluding to the Senate Internal Security subcommittee.

According to the New York Times, members of the UN Secretariat believe that:

the subcommittee has not confined itself to a search for employees guilty of espionage or of subversive activities, or for members of the Communist party, but actually is on the trail of all with a Left Wing or New Deal background.

The Secretariat also complained of leaks to newspapers from the U.S. grand jury. Overall, the Secretariat had noticed that US government was ready to go after any Americans at the UN "who were ever in the slightest degree associated with Alger Hiss."

== Legacy ==
Feller co-wrote the Charter of the United Nations (drafted 14 August 1941, signed 26 June 1945)

- United Nations Charter (co-author)
- Abraham Feller Memorial Reading Room at UN HQ NYC

Allen Garfield portrayed him in the 1992 HBO movie Citizen Cohn

== Works ==
=== Articles ===
- "Addendum to the Regulations Problem" with Erwin N. Griswold (1941)

=== Books ===
- Handbuch der entscheidungen des Ständigen schiedshofs with Ernst Schmitz (1931)
- Collection of the diplomatic and consular laws and regulations of various countries as editor with Manley O. Hudson (1933)
- Mexican claims commissions, 1923-1934 (1935)
- Reparation for injuries suffered in the service of the United Nations: oral statements with Ivan S. Kerno (1949)
- The United Nations and the World Community (1952)
