= Aurelia Reinhardt Alumnae Memorial House =

Coordinates: 37.7826°N 122.1802°W

- Interactive map of Aurelia Reinhardt Alumnae Memorial House

General information
- Location: Oakland, California
- Completed: 1949

Design and construction
- Architect: Clarence W. Mayhew
- Main contractor: Mills College

Aurelia Reinhardt Alumnae Memorial House is a building on the campus of Mills College in Oakland, California. It was designed by architect Clarence W. Mayhew, and named after college president Aurelia Henry Reinhardt. It was completed in 1949. Mayhew's design gave it "gabled roofs, wide eaves, and easy access to gardens" considered "fundamentally Californian design".
