= Charles Easton Rothwell =

American professor and State Department official (1902–1987)

Charles Easton Rothwell AKA Charles Rothwell and Charles E. Rothwell, (1902–1987) was a 20th-century, career American diplomat best known for co-writing the United Nations Charter and serving as Hoover Institution director and Mills College president.

== Background ==
Charles Easton Rothwell was born on October 9, 1902, in Denver, Colorado. In 1924, Rothwell received an A.B. from Reed College in Portland, Oregon. In 1929, he obtained an A.M. from the University of Oregon. In 1938, he obtained a doctorate from Stanford University.

== Career ==
In 1927, Rothwell became director of teacher training in social sciences at the University of Oregon, where he served until 1935. In 1932, he became an instructor of citizenship and history at Stanford University.

In 1939, he became an assistant professor at Reed College.

During World War II, Rothwell worked for the United States Department of State until 1946. In 1945, he worked with Alger Hiss in the executive secretariat to the United Nations Conference on International Organization in San Francisco, California. In 1946, he served on the US delegation to the United Nations, when he helped Abraham Feller and others write the UN Charter.

In 1946, Rothwell was a senior staff member at the Brookings Institution.

In 1947, Rothwell became vice chairman and research professor at the Hoover Institution and Library through 1952, when he became Hoover Institution director through 1959.

In 1951, Rothwell served as a staff member at the National War College.

In 1959, Rothwell became president of Mills College and he held the position through 1967, when he retired and became a regional adviser to the Asia Foundation.

== Personal life and death ==
In 1932, Rothwell married Virginia Sterling. They had one child, a daughter.

Charles Easton Rothwell died age 84 on May 1, 1987.

== Works ==
Books

- A Comparative Study of Elites with Harold D. Laswell and Daniel Lerner (1952)
- Contributed to The Policy Sciences, edited by Daniel Lerner and Harold D. Lasswell (1951)

Articles

- "War and Economics Institutes" with other contributors, War as a Social Institution (1941, American Historical Association)
- "International Relations in a World of Change" with others, World Politics (1949)
- "International Organization and World Politics" with others, International Organization, Vol. III (1949)

== External sources ==
- Register of the Charles Easton Rothwell papers
- Charles Easton Rothwell: From Mines to Minds

Academic offices
Preceded by Lynn Townsend White Jr.	President of Mills College; 1959–1967	Succeeded by Robert Joseph Wert
