= Peter Galassi =

American writer, curator, and art historian working in the field of photography

- Born: April 18, 1955 (age 71); Washington, D.C.
- Education: Phillips Exeter Academy; B.A. – Harvard College; Ph.D. – Columbia University
- Occupation: Curator
- Relatives: Barbara M. White (aunt) Jonathan Galassi (brother)

Peter Johnston Galassi (born April 18, 1951) is an American writer, curator, and art historian working in the field of photography. His principal fields are photography and nineteenth-century French art.

== Education ==
Galassi graduated from Phillips Exeter Academy in 1968. Galassi holds a B.A. in Visual and Environmental Studies from Harvard College (1972) and a Ph.D. in Art History and Archaeology from Columbia University (1986).

== Life and work ==
Galassi started his career at the Museum of Modern Art (MoMA) as a Curatorial Intern (1974–1975), Associate Curator (1981–1986), and Curator (1986–1991) working with photography curator John Szarkowski. He was Chief Curator of Photography at MoMA from 1991 to 2011.

After first organizing a Henri Cartier-Bresson exhibit in 1987 as a photography curator at MoMA, he organized a larger Cartier-Bresson exhibit as chief curator of MoMA in 2010. He was replaced as chief curator of photography at MoMA in December 2012 by Quentin Bajac, after retiring in 2011. He curated a large Barcelona exhibit of Gyula Halász in 2018, with the British Journal of Photography saying "exhibition could be considered to be Galassi’s biggest curatorial endeavour so far since he retired from MoMA." With "PROOF" in February 2020, he was guest curator on a collection of works from the collection of Mark Schwartz and Bettina Katz. The exhibit was published in the book PROOF: Photography in the Era of the Contact Sheet from the Collection of Mark Schwartz + Bettina Katz in 2020, written by Galassi.

== Exhibitions curated by Galassi ==
=== At Museum of Modern Art, New York ===
- 1975: Picture Puzzles: Photographs by Man Ray, Frederick Sommer, Clarence John Laughlin, and Robert Cumming.
- 1981: Before Photography: Painting and the Invention of Photography.
- 1986: Rosalind Solomon: Ritual.
- 1987: Henri Cartier-Bresson: The Early Work.
- 1988: Nicholas Nixon: Pictures of People.
- 1988: New Photography 4: Patrick Faigenbaum, Reagan Louie, and Michael Schmidt.
- 1989: Walker Evans: American Photographs.
- 1991: Projects: Stuart Klipper, On Antarctica 1989.
- 1991: Pleasures and Terrors of Domestic Comfort.
- 1992: More Than One Photography: Works since 1980 from the Collection.
- 1992: The Photographs of Lucas Samaras: Selections from a Recent Gift.
- 1992: New Photography 8: Dieter Appelt, Ellen Brooks, Darrel Ellis, Dennis Farber, Robert Flynt, Mary Miss, Gundula Schulze, Toshio Shibata.
- 1993: Recent Acquisitions: Photography.
- 1993: Philip-Lorca diCorcia: Strangers.
- 1993: William Wegman's Cinderella.
- 1994: Gesture and Pose: Twentieth-Century Photographs from the Collection.
- 1994: Lee Friedlander: Letters from the People.
- 1995: Recent Acquisitions: Photography.
- 1995: Helen Chadwick: Bad Blooms.
- 1995: American Photography 1890-1965 from The Museum of Modern Art, New York.
- 1996: Michael Schmidt: U-NI-TY. Co-organized with Thomas Weski, Sprengel Museum Hannover, Germany.
- 1996: Roy DeCarava: A Retrospective.
- 1996: In the Light of Italy: Corot and Early Open-Air Painting. Co-organized with Philip Conisbee, Sarah Faunce, and Jeremy Strick. National Gallery of Art, Washington.
- 1996: Pictures of the Times: A Century of Photography from The New York Times. Co-organized with Susan Kismaric.
- 1997: Recent Acquisitions: American Photography.
- 1997: From the Grace M. Mayer Collection.
- 1997: Cindy Sherman: The Complete Untitled Film Stills
- 1998: Garry Winogrand: Selections from a Major Acquisition.
- 1998: Aleksandr Rodchenko. Co-organized with Magdalena Dabrowski and Leah Dickerman.
- 2000: Graphic-Photographic. Co-organized with Christopher Mount.
- 2000: Ideal Motif: Stieglitz, Weston, Adams, and Callahan.
- 2000: The Rhetoric of Persuasion. Co-organized with Wendy Weitman.
- 2000: Seeing Double.
- 2001: Walker Evans & Company.
- 2001: Andreas Gursky.
- 2002: Life of the City. Co-organized with the curatorial staff of the Department of Photography and the organizers of Here is New York.
- 2005: Friedlander.
- 2006: Landscape: Recent Acquisitions. Co-organized with the curatorial staff of the Department of Photography.
- 2007: Barry Frydlender: Place and Time.
- 2007: Jeff Wall.
- 2008: Bernd and Hilla Becher: Landscape/Typology.
- 2010: Henri Cartier-Bresson: The Modern Century.

=== At other institutions ===
- 2015: Robert Frank in America, Iris & B. Gerald Cantor Center for Visual Arts, Stanford, CA.
- 2015: In The Studio: Photographs, Gagosian Gallery, New York City.
- 2015: Land Meets Water: European and American Photography from 1860 to the Present, Artipelag, Gustavsberg, Sweden.
- 2018: Brassaï, Fundación MAPFRE Casa Garriga Nogués, Barcelona, Spain.

== Publications ==
=== Books and exhibition catalogues ===
- Before Photography: Painting and the Invention of Photography. New York: The Museum of Modern Art, 1981. ISBN 978-0870702549.
  - Italian edition: Prima della fotografia: La pittura e l'invenzione della fotografia. Turin: Bollati Boringhieri Editori, 1989.
- Henri Cartier-Bresson: The Early Work. New York: The Museum of Modern Art, 1987. ISBN 978-0870702624
  - French edition: Henri Cartier-Bresson: Premières photos. De l'objectif hasardeux au hasard objectif. Paris: Arthaud, 1991. Trans. Pierre Leyris.
  - German edition: Henri Cartier-Bresson: Die frühen Photographien. Munich: Schirmer/Mosel, 2007. Trans. Rudolf Hermstein and Martina Tichy.
- Nicholas Nixon: Pictures of People. New York: The Museum of Modern Art, 1988. ISBN 978-0870704376
- Corot in Italy: Open-Air Painting and the Classical-Landscape Tradition. New Haven and London: Yale University Press, 1991.ISBN 978-0300049572
  - French edition: Corot en Italie: La peinture de plein air et la tradition classique. Paris: Éditions Gallimard, 1991. Trans. Jeanne Bouniort.
  - German edition: Corot in Italien: Freilichtmalerei und klassische Landschaftstradition. Munich: Hirmer Verlag, 1991. Trans. Annemarie Seling.
  - Italian edition: Corot in Italia: La pittura di plein air e la tradizione del paesaggio classico. Turin: Bollati Boringhieri Editori, 1994. Trans. Anna Bertolino.
- Pleasures and Terrors of Domestic Comfort. New York: The Museum of Modern Art, 1991. ISBN 978-0810960978
- American Photography 1890-1965 from The Museum of Modern Art. New York: The Museum of Modern Art, 1995. ISBN 978-0870701405
  - German edition: Amerikanische Photographie 1890-1965 aus der Sammlung desMuseum of Modern Art, New York. Munich: Schirmer/Mosel, 1995. Trans. Jörg Trobitius.
  - French edition: Photographie américaine de 1890 à 1965 à travers la collection du Museum of Modern Art, New York. Paris: Centre Georges Pompidou, 1995. Trans. Jeanne Bouniort.
  - Spanish edition: Fotografia americana 1890-1965 en The Museum of Modern Art, New York. Valencia: IVAM Centre Julio González, 1995.
- Philip-Lorca diCorcia (Contemporaries: A Photography Series). New York: The Museum of Modern Art, 1995. ISBN 978-0870701450
- Roy DeCarava: A Retrospective. New York: Museum of Modern Art, 1996. ISBN 978-0870701269.
- Pictures of the Times: A Century of Photography from The New York Times. New York: The Museum of Modern Art, 1996. Edited by Peter Galassi and Susan Kismaric. ISBN 978-0870701153
- Aleksandr Rodchenko. New York: The Museum of Modern Art, 1998. By Magdalena Dabrowski, Leah Dickerman, and Peter Galassi. ISBN 978-0810961876
- Making Choices: 1929, 1939, 1948, 1955I. New York: The Museum of Modern Art, 2000. ISBN 978-0870700293 By Peter Galassi, Robert Storr, and Anne Umland.
- Walker Evans & Company. New York: The Museum of Modern Art, 2000. ISBN 978-0870700323.
- Andreas Gursky. New York: The Museum of Modern Art, 2001. ASIN B019NE8L7M.
  - German edition: Andreas Gursky. Ostfildern-Ruit: Hatje Cantz Verlag, 2001. Trans. Hinrich von Haaren.
  - Spanish edition of text: Madrid: Museo Nacional Centro De Arte Reina Sofia, 2001. Trans. María Luisa Balseiro.
- Henri Cartier-Bresson: The Man, the Image and the World. London: Thames & Hudson Ltd, 2003. ASIN B01K0TJN8K.
- Friedlander. New York: Museum of Modern Art, 2005. ISBN 0-87070-343-9. With an essay by Richard Benson.
- Barry Frydlender: Place and Time. New York: The Museum of Modern Art, 2007. ISBN 978-0870707186.
- Jeff Wall. New York: Museum of Modern Art; San Francisco: San Francisco Museum of Modern Art 2007. ISBN 978-0870707070. With an interview with Jeff Wall by James Rondeau.
- Henri Cartier-Bresson: The Modern Century. New York: The Museum of Modern Art, 2010. ISBN 978-0870707780.
  - French edititon: Henri Cartier-Bresson: un siècle modern. Paris: Éditions Hazan, 2010. Trans. Jean-François Allain.
  - German edition: Henri Cartier-Bresson: sein 20. Munich: Schirmer/Mosel, 2010. Trans. Ursula Wulfekamp and Matthias Wolf.
  - Italian edition: Henri Cartier-Bresson: il secolo modern. Rome:Contrasto, 2010. Trans. Maria Baiocchi.
  - Portuguese (Brazilian) edition: Henri Cartier-Bresson:o século moderno. São Paulo: Cosac Naify, 2010. Trans. Cid Knipel.
  - Spanish edition: Henri Cartier-Bresson: el siglo modern. Madrid: La Fabrica Editorial, 2010. Trans. Miguel Marqués, Tamara Gil Somoza, and Elena Sanjosé Román.
- Richard Benson: North South East West. New York: The Museum of Modern Art, 2011. ISBN 978-0870708169.
- Ansel Adams in Yosemite Valley: Celebrating the Park at 150. New York: Little, Brown and Company, 2014. ISBN 978-0316323406.
- Robert Frank in America. Göttingen: Steidl, Palo Alto: Cantor Arts Center at Stanford University, 2014. ISBN 978-3869307350.
  - French edition: Robert Frank en amérique. Göttingen: Steidl, 2015. Trans. Juliette Lê.
  - Spanish edition: Robert Frank en américa. Madrid: La Fábrica, 2016.
- In the Studio: Photographs. New York: Phaidon, New York: Gagosian Gallery, 2015.ISBN 978-0714870267
- Brassaï. Madrid: Fundación MAPFRE, 2018. ISBN 978-8498446449. With contributions by Stuart Alexander and Atonio Muñoz Molina.

=== Books with contributions by Galassi ===
- "Caillebotte's Method." In Gustave Caillebotte: A Retrospective Exhibition. Houston: The Museum of Fine Arts, 1976, pp. 192–206. ASIN B000XTX2AI
  - Reprinted with revisions in Gustave Caillebotte, by Kirk Varnedoe. New Haven and London: Yale University Press, 1987, pp. 27–40.
  - French edition: Gustave Caillebotte. Paris: Editions Adam Biro, 1988, pp. 27–40.
- "Mark Klett: Present and Past in the American West." In Mark Klett, Traces of Eden: Travels in the Desert Southwest. Boston: David R. Godine, 1986, n.p. ASIN B01FJ070IA
- "A Note on the Fiftieth-Anniversary Edition." In Walker Evans, American Photographs. Fiftieth-Anniversary Edition. New York: The Museum of Modern Art, 1988, pp. 200–02. ISBN 978-0870702389
- "La Photographie et l'inertie de la théorie artistique." In Les Multiples inventions de la photographie, by Pierre Bonhomme. Paris: Mission du Patrimonie photographique, 1989, pp. 126–32. ASIN B008J23256
- "The Nineteenth Century: Valenciennes to Corot." In Claude to Corot: The Development of Landscape Painting in France, by Alan Wintermute. New York: Colnaghi, Seattle: University of Washington Press, 1990, pp. 233–49. ISBN 978-0295970868
- "Postmodernism and Photography." In 1990 Photography Today Report. Tokyo: Tokyo Metropolitan Culture Foundation, 1991, pp. 65–66. Text in English and Japanese.
- "A Tribute to J.A. Gere." In In the Light of Italy: Corot and Early Open-Air Painting. Washington, D.C.: National Gallery of Art, New Haven: Yale University Press, 1996, pp. 23–27. ISBN 978-0300067941
- "Before Corot." In, Corot, un artiste et son temps. Actes des colloques organisés au musée du Louvre par le Service culturel les 1er et 2 mars à Paris et par l’Académie deFrance à Rome, villa Médicis, le 9 mars 1996 à Rome. by Chiara Stefani, Vincent Pomarède, and Gérard de Wallens. Paris: Klincksieck, 1998, pp. 397–422. ISBN 978-2252032282
- "Conserving Photography and Preserving the Vitality of our Culture." In Miguel Angel Corzo, Mortality Immortality?: The Legacy of 20th-Century Art. Los Angeles: The Getty Conservation Institute, 1999, pp. 81–84.ISBN 978-0892365289
- Untitled afterword. In Nicholas Nixon, The Brown Sisters. New York: The Museum of Modern Art, 1999, n.p. ISBN 978-0870700422
- "Natura Pictrix: Un entretien de Vik Muniz avec Peter Galassi." In Vik Muniz. Paris: Centre national de la Photographie, 1999, pp. 7–13. ISBN 978-2867541230
- Untitled introduction. In Lee Friedlander, Staglieno. Portland, Oregon: Nazraeli Press, 2002. ISBN 978-1590050392
- "And Everything in Between." In Philippe Arbaïzar, Henri Cartier-Bresson: The Man, the Image and the World: A Retrospective. London: Thames & Hudson, 2003. ISBN 978-0500286425
- "Rude and Crude: Cartier-Bresson at Julien Levy Gallery." In Documentary & Anti-Graphic Photographs by Cartier-Bresson, Walker Evans & Alvarez Bravo, by Agnès Sire. Paris: Fondation Henri Cartier-Bresson, Göttingen: Steidl, 2004, pp. 100–102. ISBN 978-3865210722
  - Bilingual edition; French: Rustre et Frustre: Cartier-Bresson à la Galerie Julien Levy, pp. 97–99.
- "Foreword and Acknowledgments." In Alexander N. Lavrentiev, Experiments for the Future: Diaries, Essays, Letters, and Other Writings. New York: The Museum of Modern Art, 2005, pp. 8–9. ISBN 978-0870705465
- "Introduction." In Mount St. Helens: Photographs by Frank Gohlke. New York: The Museum of Modern Art, 2005, pp. 8–9 ISBN 978-0870703461
- "A Tribute to Italo Zannier." In Fotologie: Scritti in onore di Italo Zannier, by Nico Stringa.Padova: il Poligrafo, 2006, pp. 29–30. ISBN 978-8871155227
- Untitled afterword. In Nicholas Nixon, The Brown Sisters: Thirty-Three Years. New York: The Museum of Modern Art, 2007, n.p. ISBN 978-0870707193
  - Spanish edition: Nicholas Nixon, Las hermanas Brown 1975-2007. Trans. Mercedes Rivas. Madrid: Fundación MAPFRE in association with The Museum of Modern Art, New York, n.p.
- "Preface." In Jeff Wall, Selected Essays and Interviews. New York: The Museum of Modern Art, 2007. p. 6. ISBN 978-0870707087
- "Introduction." In Mark Steinmetz, South Central. Portland, Oregon: Nazraeli Press, 2008, p. 5. ISBN 1590051718
- "Walker Evans und die Kunst des Faktischen." In Ortrud Westheider and Michael Philipp, New York Photography 1890-1950: Von Stieglitz bis Man Ray, by . München: Hirmer Verlag, Hamburg: Bucerius Kunst Forum, 2012, pp. 42–51. ISBN 978-3777451114
- "Like an actor on a screen, watching himself: An email conversation between Thomas Demand and Peter Galassi". In Susan van Wyk, Thomas Demand. Melbourne: National Gallery of Victoria International, 2012, pp. 72–74. ISBN 978-0724103669
- Untitled essay. In Nicholas Nixon, Close Far. Göttingen: Steidl, 2013, n.p. ISBN 978-3869305363, Barral, 2013, n.p.
- "William Wegman Discovers Photography." In Eurkea: William Wegman Photographs 1970-1975. New York: Craig F. Starr Gallery, 2013. ISBN 978-0989459020
- "I libri di Gianni Berengo Gardin." In Gianni Berengo Gardin, Il libro dei libri, by Bruno Carbone. Rome: Contrasto, 2014, pp. 7–13. ISBN 978-8869654442
- "A Fixed Point / En fast punkt." In Irving Penn: Timeless Moments. Stockholm: Åmells, 2014, pp. 7–9 (English) and 11–13 (Swedish). ISBN 9789197784894
- "I Marziani di Mantegazza / Mantegazza's Martians." In Jacoppo Moggi Cecchi and Roscoe Stanyon, Il Museo di Storia Naturale dell’Università degli Studi di Firenze, vol. V, Le Collezioni antropologiche ed etnologiche. Firenze: University Press, 2014, pp. 224–25. Italian and English. ISBN 978-8866556152
- "Les Anonymes de Pierre de Fenoÿl, un nouveau regard." In Virginie Chardin, Pierre de Fenoÿl: une géographie imaginaire. Paris: Éditions Xavier Barral, 2015, pp. 224–29. ISBN 978-2365110730
- "Surrendering to the Picture." In Lee Friedlander & Pierre Bonnard: Photographs & Drawings, Göttingen: Steidl, New York: Pace/MacGill Gallery, Cologne: Galerie Thomas Zander, 2015, pp. 6–11. ISBN 978-3958290884
- "La rupture esthétique d’Eugène Atget." In Les Silences d’Atget: Une anthologie de texts, by Luce Lebart. Paris: Éditions Textuel, 2016, pp. 233–36. ISBN 978-2845975453
- "Faire collection: une enquête." In Clément Chéroux and Karolina Ziebinska-Lewandowska, The Pencil of Culture: 10 ans d’acquisitions de photographies au Centre Pompidou. Paris: Centre Pompidou and Filigranes Éditions, 2016, pp. 146–76. ISBN 978-2350464039
- "Afterword." In Tina Barney. New York: Rizzoli, 2017, pp. 218–26. ISBN 978-0847860364
- "Afterword." In Lee Friedlander. The American Monument. New York: Eakins Press Foundation, 2017, n.p. ISBN 978-0871300720
- Untitled essay. In Sheron Rupp, Taken from Memory. Berlin: Kehrer Heidelberg, 2019, p. 105. ISBN 978-3868288926

== Awards ==
- 1988: Infinity Award, International Center of Photography Award for Writing in Photography, New York, (for Cartier-Bresson: The Early Work).
- 1999: International Award of Photography, Centro di Ricerca e Archiviazione della Fotografia, Spilembergo, Italy.
- 2010: Lucie Awards – Exhibition of the Year: Henri Cartier-Bresson: The Modern Century.
- 2012: Guggenheim Fellowship.
