= Janet L. Holmgren =

12th President of Mills College
- In office 1991–2011
- Preceded by: Virginia Smith (acting president)
- Succeeded by: Alecia A. DeCoudreaux

Personal details
- Born: United States
- Education: Princeton University (Ph.D. Linguistics 1974), Oakland University (B.A. English 1968)
- Profession: Linguist

Janet L. Holmgren is the president of Patten University. Previously, she was the president of Mills College in Oakland, California from 1991 to 2011. She was previously vice provost at Princeton University from 1988 to 1991. Before that, she was an administrator and professor at the University of Maryland. She holds a B.A. in English, summa cum laude, from Oakland University (Rochester, MI), 1968, a M.A. in Linguistics (1971) and a Ph.D. in Linguistics, Princeton University, 1974.

== Honors ==
- Honorary degree, Golden Gate University, 1995
- Honorary degree, Mount Vernon College, Washington DC, 1992
- Award for Excellence in Education, California National Organization for Women, 2002
- Donna Shavlik Leadership Award for Lifetime Service, Office of Women in Higher Education, American Council on Education, 2001

== Professional activities ==
- Trustee, Princeton University
- Board of Directors Carnegie Foundation for the Advancement of Teaching (and Past Chair)
- Board of Directors, National Council for Research on Women (and Past Chair)
- Executive Board, Women's College Coalition (and Past Chair)
- Board of Directors American Council on Education –Executive Committee
- Executive Committee, Association of Independent California Colleges and Universities (and Past Chair)
- Advisory Council, California Academy of Sciences
- Master Plan Committee for Education in California
- Advisory Council, California Academy of Sciences

Academic offices
Preceded by Mary S. Metz	President of Mills College; 1991–2011	Succeeded by Alecia A. DeCoudreaux
