= Leah Dickerman =

American art historian

Leah Dickerman is the director of research programs at The Museum of Modern Art in New York City. She was formerly director of editorial & content strategy at MoMA. Serving previously as the museum’s first Marlene Hess Curator of Painting and Sculpture, a post endowed in 2015, Dickerman previously held the positions of curator of painting and sculpture at MoMA (2008–2015), acting head of the Department of Modern and Contemporary Art at the National Gallery of Art (NGA), Washington, D.C. (2007), and associate curator in modern and contemporary art at the NGA (2001–2007). Over the course of her career, Dickerman has organized or co-organized a series of exhibitions including One-Way Ticket: Jacob Lawrence's Migration Series and Other Works (2015), Inventing Abstraction, 1910-1925 (2012–2013), Diego Rivera: Murals for the Museum of Modern Art (2011–2012), Bauhaus: Workshops for Modernity (2009–2010), Dada (2005–2006), and Aleksandr Rodchenko (1998).

Dickerman has served on the editorial board of the journal October since 2001 and has written extensively on European art between the two World Wars. She was assistant professor of art history at Stanford University from 1997 to 2000 and has also taught at Princeton University, Columbia University, and the University of Delaware. She was the David E. Finley Fellow at the Center for Advanced Studies in the Visual Arts (CASVA) at the National Gallery of Art.

In 2019, Leah Dickerman was elected to the American Academy of Arts and Sciences.

== Education ==
- Columbia University, 1997. Ph.D., Art History. "Aleksandr Rodchenko's Camera-Eye: Lef Vision and the Production of Revolutionary Consciousness."
- Harvard College, 1986. A.B., History and Literature.

== Exhibitions ==
- Robert Rauschenberg: Among Friends, The Museum of Modern Art, New York (2017). Curator. Exhibition Catalogue.
- One-Way Ticket: Jacob Lawrence’s Migration Series and Other Visions of the Great Movement North, The Museum of Modern Art, New York (2015). Curator. Exhibition Catalogue.
- Inventing Abstraction, 1910–1925, The Museum of Modern Art, New York (2012). Curator. Exhibition Catalogue. Inventing Abstraction received the 2012 Association of American Museum Curators Award for "Outstanding Thematic Exhibition" and the 2012 International Association of Art Critics (AICA) Award for "Best Historical Museum Show Nationally".
- Diego Rivera: Murals for The Museum of Modern Art, The Museum of Modern Art, New York (2011). Curator. Exhibition Catalogue
- Bauhaus 1919–1933: Workshops for Modernity, The Museum of Modern Art, New York (2009). Co-curator with Barry Bergdoll. Bauhaus received the 2009 American Association of Museum Curators Award for "Outstanding Exhibition", and the 2010 AICA Award for "Best Architecture or Design Show".
- Dada: Zurich, Berlin, Hannover, Cologne, New York, Paris, National Gallery of Art, Washington, DC, (2006). Co-curator with Laurent LeBon. Organized by the National Gallery of Art and the Centre Pompidou, Paris, in collaboration with The Museum of Modern Art, New York. Dada was noted as "Best Thematic Exhibition 2006" by the American Association of Art Critics.
- The Cubist Paintings of Diego Rivera: Memory, Politics, Place, National Gallery of Art, Washington, DC, (2004). Curator. Organized in collaboration with the Museo de Arte Moderno, Mexico City.
- Aleksandr Rodchenko, Museum of Modern Art, New York (1998). Co-curator with Peter Galassi and Magdalena Dabrowski.
- Building the Collective: Soviet Graphic Design, 1917–1937; Selections from the Collection of Merrill C. Berman, Miriam and Ira D. Wallach Art Gallery, Columbia University (1994). Curator. Exhibition catalogue.

== Selected bibliography ==
- Robert Rauschenberg (2016). Exhibition catalogue.
- Inventing Abstraction, 1910-1925: How a Radical Idea Changed Modern Art (2012). Exhibition catalogue. This publication received the 2012 "PROSE Award for Excellence" (Art Exhibitions) from the Association of American Publishers, the 2012 AAMC Award for Excellence as "Outstanding Thematic Exhibition Catalogue," and the Dedalus Foundation's Exhibition Catalogue Award for a volume published in 2013 that makes "a significant contribution to the understanding of modern art or modernism."
- "Schwitters fec." in Kurt Schwitters: Color and Collage, edited by Isabel Schulz (2010).
- Bauhaus 1919-1933 (2009). Exhibition catalogue. Recognized by the American Association of Museum Curators in 2009 as the "Outstanding Exhibition Catalogue."
- "The Fact and the Photograph" in "Soviet Factography: A Special Issue," edited by Devin Fore, October, Vol. 118 (2006), pp. 132–152.
- Dada: Zurich, Berlin, Hannover, Cologne, New York, Paris (2005). Exhibition catalogue. Recognized by the American Association of Museum Curators in 2006 as "Best Museum Exhibition Catalogue."
- "Merz and Memory: On Kurt Schwitters" in The Dada Seminars (CASVA Seminar Papers), edited by Leah Dickerman with Matthew Witkovsky (2005), pp. 103–126.
- "Dada Gambits" in "Dada: A Special Issue," edited by Leah Dickerman, October, Vol. 105 (2003), pp. 3–12.
- "El Lissitzky's Camera Corpus" in Situating El Lissitzky: Vitebsk, Berlin, Moscow (Issues and Debates Series), edited by Nancy Perloff and Brian Reed (2003), pp. 153–176.
- "Lenin in the Age of Mechanical Reproduction" in Disturbing Remains: Memory, History, and Crisis in the Twentieth Century, edited by Michael S. Roth and Charles G. Salas (2001).
- "Dada's Solipsism" Documents, Vol. 19 (Fall 2000), pp. 16–19.
- "Camera Obscura: Socialist Realism in the Shadow of Photography" October, Vol. 93 (2000), pp. 138–153.
- Aleksandr Rodchenko (1998). Exhibition catalogue.
- Building the Collective: Soviet Graphic Design 1917-1937 (1996). Exhibition catalogue.
