= Hettie Belle Ege =

American mathematician

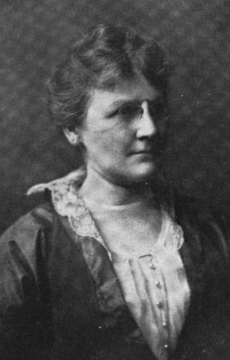
- Hettie Belle Ege, during her term as acting president of Mills College, from a 1915 publication
- Born: March 31, 1861; Erie, Illinois
- Died: November 19, 1942 (aged 81); Oakland, California
- Other names: Hettie Ege, Hetty Ege, Hetty Belle Ege
- Occupations: Mathematics professor, college dean

Hettie Belle Ege (31 March 1861 – 19 November 1942) was an American professor of mathematics. From 1914 to 1916, she was the acting president of Mills College.

== Early life ==
Ege was born in Erie, Illinois on 31 March 1861, the daughter of Joseph Arthur Ege and his second wife, Catherine Rebecca Reisch Ege. Her parents were both from Pennsylvania; her father died the year she was born, and her mother remarried in 1869. She attended Western College in Oxford, Ohio, graduating in 1886; she later graduated from Mills College in 1903, with further studies at the University of Chicago, the Ludwig-Maximilians-Universität München, and the University of California.

== Career ==
Ege taught school in Ohio and Colorado as a young woman. From 1895 to 1930, she was a professor of mathematics and Dean of Women at Mills College. She also coached the Mills College basketball team. From 1914 to 1916, she was the college's acting president. "Since Mills is to California what Wellesley is to the East," explained a California magazine in 1915, "it is most apparent that the leading spirit of the institution is a dominant figure in the educational activities of the state."

In 1918, she chaperoned a unit of 28 Mills students in the Woman's Land Army, providing ranch labor during wartime shortages. In 1920, the college marked her twenty-five years at Mills with a presentation and convocation. At the festivities marking the school's founder's centennial in 1925, Ege received an honorary doctorate.

After her retirement in 1930, she spent some time in Cambridge, in England. She was a regular guest at Mills College events and alumnae gatherings: in 1933 she was honored as the college's dean emerita, alongside president Aurelia Henry Reinhardt and physician Mariana Bertola, at an annual breakfast of the Mills Club of San Francisco.

== Death ==
Ege died November 19, 1942, aged 81 years, in Oakland, California. Her grave is on the campus of Mills College, and there is a dormitory named for Ege at Mills.
