= Barbara M. White =

American ambassador (born 1920)

- Barbara M. White, from a 1969 magazine
- Born: July 23, 1920; Evanston, Illinois
- Died: December 30, 1984 (aged 64); Duxbury, Massachusetts
- Occupations: Diplomat, college president
- Relatives: Peter Galassi (nephew)

Barbara McClure White (July 23, 1920 – December 30, 1984) was an ambassador and president of Mills College.

== Early life and education ==
White was born in Evanston, Illinois. She received her bachelor's degree in history from Mount Holyoke College in 1941. She later earned a master's degree in American Studies from Harvard University.

== Career ==
White worked for Encyclopedia Britannica, the Office of War Information, and on the national staff of the League of Women Voters from 1947 to 1951. She worked as a Foreign Service Officer, serving in Chile, Portugal, Spain, and Italy before becoming the deputy director of the United States Information Agency, the first woman to serve in such a senior role in the Agency. In 1973, White became the first woman with ambassadorial rank in the United States delegation to the United Nations.

The National Civil Service League recognized White in 1967 with a career service award. In 1972, she received a Rockefeller Public Service Award.

She was president of Mills College from 1976 to 1980. White explained her perspective on educational leadership in 1976, saying,

"The basic purpose of a liberal arts education is to liberate the human being to exercise his or her potential to the fullest. And that means tearing down some of the walls of provincialism with which a person grows up."

After her retirement, Mills established the Barbara M. White Professor of Public Policy Chair. There is a collection of White's papers in the library at Mills College.

== Personal life ==
Barbara McClure White died from cancer in 1984, aged 64 years, at a nursing home in Duxbury, Massachusetts. Photographer, writer, and curator Peter Galassi is her nephew.

Academic offices
| Preceded by Robert Joseph Wert | President of Mills College; 1976–1980 | Succeeded by Mary S. Metz |
