= Mary S. Metz =

Mary S. Metz was president of Mills College between 1981 and 1990.

She has held positions on the board of directors for several prominent U.S. corporations including Sodexo, PG&E, Union Bank of California, AT&T and Pacific Telesis. From January 1999 to March 2005 she was president of S.H. Cowell Foundation.

She graduated from Radcliffe College and Harvard University.

Academic offices
Preceded by Barbara M. White	President of Mills College; 1981–1990	Succeeded by Janet L. Holmgren
