= Clarence W. W. Mayhew =

American architect (1906–1994)

- Born: March 1, 1906; Colorado, US
- Died: February 13, 1994 (aged 87); San Rafael, California, US
- Occupation: Architect

Clarence William Whitehead Mayhew (March 1, 1906 – February 13, 1994) was an American architect best known as a designer of residential structures in the San Francisco Bay Area. Recognition came to him with a home designed in 1937 for the Manor family in Orinda, California; one which was included as an example of modern architecture's effect on the contemporary ranch house in California in several post-war published compilations of residential works.

== Career ==
Mayhew took a job in San Francisco with well-known architect Arthur Brown Jr. sometime around 1922, working as a draftsman. Brown encouraged Mayhew to study at l'École des Beaux-Arts in Paris for two years; Mayhew finished in 1925. Returning to California, Mayhew obtained his architect degree from the University of California, Berkeley, in 1927. Mayhew was subsequently hired by Miller and Pflueger and worked with that firm for six years during a time when they were designing prominent skyscrapers and movie palaces as well as taking occasional commissions for residential dwellings. In 1934 or 1935, Mayhew formed his own firm: Clarence W.W. Mayhew, Architect.

Mayhew's influential Manor House was designed in 1937 for Marjorie and Harold V. Manor. Manor was a San Francisco native who married Marjorie W. Arnold in 1908. He joined three different garden clubs including the California Horticultural Society. The house that Mayhew designed for the Manors was basically a ranch house in structure, but light and airy with floor-to-ceiling windows and extensive skylights. It received notice across the country for its clean, light, asymmetrical lines and its embrace of both indoor and outdoor spaces. Its U-shaped plan enclosed a central lawn, and cost US$14,500 to build in 1938. A series of publications made mention of the design—it appeared in House and Garden, Architect and Engineer, Progressive Architecture, Modern House in America, Tomorrow's House and If You Want to Build a House. In 1974, architectural historian David Gebhard wrote of the design: "...California’s ability to wed indoors and outdoors was beautifully captured in the solarium, with its glass roof, sliding glass walls, and the adjacent sliding glass walls of the living room. This house was a realization of flexible indoor/outdoor space, so often discussed by the exponents of modernism but never achieved in such a lyric fashion." Mayhew was quoted in Architectural Forum in 1939 as saying that "the house has a Japanese character in both plan and elevation. Although I did not copy any Japanese details, I did copy the underlying principle."

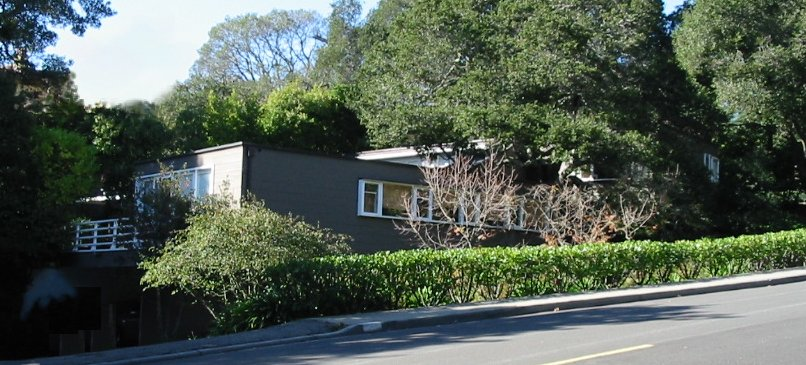
Mayhew's own home, carefully sited amid existing trees. Mayhew and Chermayeff designed a greater level of privacy on the street facing, saving expansive glass walls for the garden side

Mayhew designed his own house in collaboration with Serge Chermayeff, associate architect and employee of Mayhew's during 1940–1941 when Chermayeff was also teaching at California School of Fine Arts. Chermayeff was brought in so that Mayhew would not have his own wife for a client. The house contrasted sharply with existing homes on Hampton Road, and appeared to be made of rectangular shapes descending the sloped property. The house divided into two functional groups, one for adults and one for children, with all living and sleeping rooms facing south. Glass walls were specified to allow maximum sunlight and viewing pleasure. The two main structural units enclosed a private garden and were connected by a broad stairway enclosed against the weather, with the street side made of solid wood and the garden side fully glazed. The three children's rooms were separated with demountable hanging walls that could be changed to adapt to the family's needs. Author Alan Hess wrote in 2007 that the clean abstraction of the rectilinear blocks appeared to be based on Chermayeff's Bauhaus leanings but that the casual, site-specific interaction of garden, house and modernity showed the relaxation of California living apparent in Mayhew's prior work.

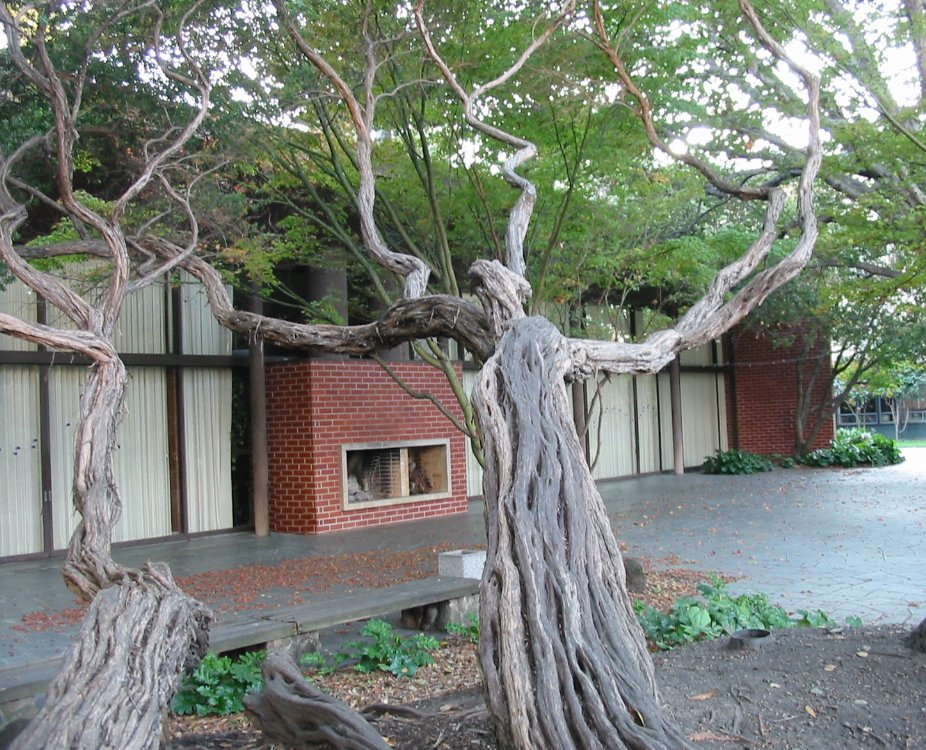
A view of the outdoor terrace behind Mayhew's Alumni House at the University of California, Berkeley

Mayhew designed two alumni houses for local colleges. The Reinhardt Alumnae House was completed in 1949 for Mills College, and the Alumni House was finished in 1953 for the University of California, Berkeley. The latter structure, made for US$375,000 out of stone, brick, steel and glass and organized into two wings in the International style, was mentioned twice in Progressive Architecture, receiving notice in the Progressive Architecture Annual Design Survey for 1954 (Education).

== Social activities ==
Mayhew was an active member of the Bohemian Club and The Family. He served as "Father" at The Family and took part in the Bohemian Club's summer encampments at the Bohemian Grove where he directed the Lecture series for 20 years and was known as "Hap". He volunteered with the props and sets department in at least one Grove Play: Birds of Rhiannon (1930) and in 1969 he gave a Lakeside Talk.

Mayhew was a board member of the San Francisco Museum of Modern Art and of the Talent Bank. He joined the St. Francis Yacht Club and the California Pioneers. Late in life, Mayhew developed Parkinson's disease. He and his wife Joan Virginia Rapp Mayhew moved to San Rafael together. Mayhew died there in 1994; Joan died in 2005 at age 91, survived by their daughter, Joan Mayhew Beales.

== Works ==
- 1928 – “Brat House,” Lawrence W. Harris Family 360 Mountain Home Road, Woodside, California
- 1930–1931 – McGuire House Project, Wildwood Gardens, Piedmont, California
- 1935 – Edward G. Mayhew House, Oakland, California
- 1936 – Oakland House, Oakland, California
- 1937 – Manor House, Monte Vista, Orinda, California
- 1937–1938 – Rowell House, Berkeley, California
- 1938 – Morgan House, San Rafael, California
- 1938 – McHale House, Oakland, California
- 1939 – Sebree House, Berkeley, California
- 1941–1942 – Clarence W.W. Mayhew House, 330 Hampton Road, Piedmont, California
- 1941–1942 – St. Germain Avenue (Clarendon Heights View Home), San Francisco, California
- 1945–1946 – Shingle House, San Francisco, California
- 1947 – Hale House, Hillsborough, California
- 1949 – Aurelia Henry Reinhardt Alumnae House, Mills College, Oakland, California
- 1952–1953 – Alumni House, University of California, Berkeley
- 1952–1953 – Kaiser Foundation Medical Center, Walnut Creek, California
- Kaiser Foundation Hospital, Panorama City, California
- Kaiser Foundation Hospital, Harbor City, California
- 1953 – Scenic Road House, Carmel-by-the-Sea, California
- 1955 – Mountain Avenue House, Piedmont, California
- 1958 – Packard House, Los Altos Hills, California
- 1958 - Raphel House, Oakland, California
- 1960 – Piedmont House, Piedmont, California
- 1961–1962 – Manning's Restaurant, Pasadena, California
- 1962–1964 – Manning's Cafeteria, Ballard, Seattle, Washington
- 1964 – Steen Mansion, Washoe Valley, Nevada
- Gates Rubber Company Building, Denver, Colorado
- Packard House, Big Sur, California
- Racetrack, Lima, Peru
