= Luella Clay Carson =

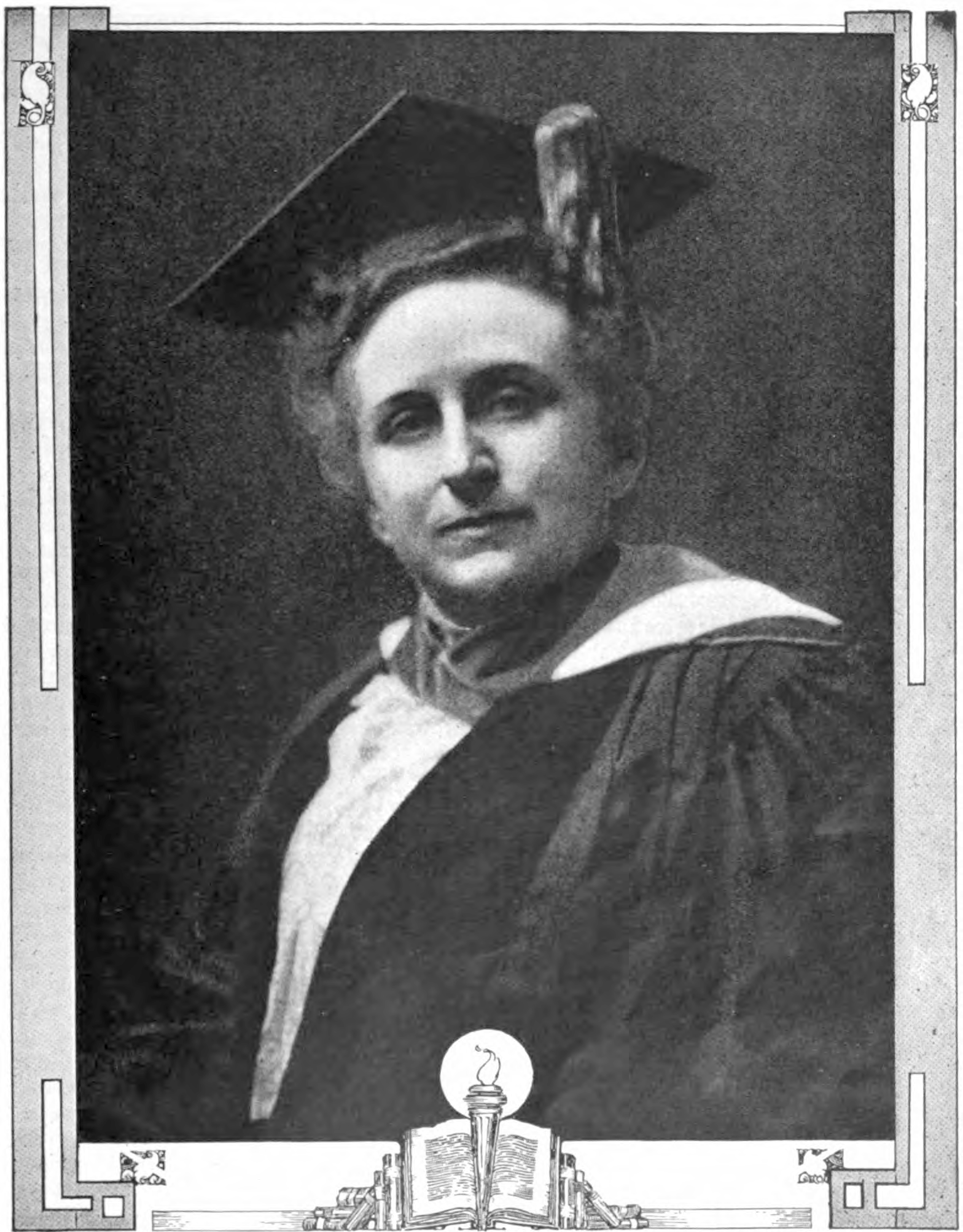

Luella Clay Carson (1856-1938) was an educator and university president in the U.S. states of Oregon and California.

Carson was born in Portland, Oregon to pioneer parents. She taught at Pacific University prior to becoming the first chair of the English Department at the University of Oregon in 1888. She became the Dean of Women there in 1895, and remained with the university until 1909. Carson departed to become the fifth president of Mills College (from 1909 to 1914). Carson Hall, a women's residence at the University of Oregon, was named in her honor. She was writer, best known for her Handbook of English Composition, a textbook on English grammar and style adopted by Wellesley College and the New York City public schools.
