= Silver Apples of the Moon (Morton Subotnick album) =

Studio album by Morton Subotnick
- Released: July 1967
- Recorded: 1966–67, New York City
- Genres: Electronic; experimental; classical; electronic dance music
- Length: 31:25
- Labels: Nonesuch, Elektra
- Producer: Morton Subotnick

Morton Subotnick chronology
Silver Apples of the Moon (1967)	The Wild Bull (1968)

Silver Apples of the Moon is the debut album by the American composer Morton Subotnick, released by Nonesuch Records in July 1967. It contains the titular composition, which is divided into two parts corresponding to the two sides of the original LP record. A showcase for the Buchla 100 series modular synthesizer, an early analog synthesizer that the composer helped develop, it was the first piece of electronic music commissioned by a record company.

Recorded over a 13-month deadline, Subotnick spent up to ten hours a day working on the composition, hoping to create sounds that other musicians would find hard to recreate. Subotnick took the name of the album from W. B. Yeats' poem "The Song of Wandering Aengus". The composition is experimental in style, with "Part I" featuring slow, calm passages and experimentation in tone and "Part II" featuring a steady pulse and sequenced rhythms, the latter an innovation for the time. Subotnick premiered the piece at the opening night of the Electric Circus nightclub in New York City.

Upon release, Silver Apples of the Moon became a surprise success, selling well in the classical music category, and received critical acclaim. The record has since gone on to be considered a milestone in electronic music; it was the first album to feature a voltage-controlled synthesizer and the first piece of both classical and electronic music written specifically for the album format. The album's sequenced rhythms are credited with anticipating subsequent electronic dance music, and today the record is considered to be Subotnick's signature work. In a 1992 list, The Wire considered it among the 100 most important albums ever, and in 2009, the Library of Congress added it to the National Recording Registry.

== Background ==
Subotnick began creating electronic music as a student at Mills College in the late 1950s, a period during which he also played clarinet with the San Francisco Symphony. When commissioned to write incidental music for a production of King Lear, Subotnick instead recorded vocals from the play's lead actor Michael O'Sullivan and cut-and-pasted the tape of his voice in various fashions for almost a year until he had created a resulting piece of music constructed entirely out of O'Sullivan's voice. The composer realised that the technology he used could create a new environment for composing that he referred to as "music as studio art": "You would be composing music as a studio art. I made the decision at that point that this new technology was going to allow for everything to be different. A new kind of composer." Subotnick's new interest in electro-acoustic music led to him founding the San Francisco Tape Music Center in 1961 with fellow musicians Ramon Sender and Pauline Oliveros. They and their collaborators and associates at the San Francisco Tape Music Center aspired to create compositions featuring sounds that could not be created with conventional acoustic instruments.

Subotnick and Sender searched San Francisco for an engineer who could help materialize their concepts about sound manipulation via electronic circuits, and soon found engineer and amateur composer Don Buchla. Using a $500 grant from the Rockefeller Foundation, they created the Buchla 100 modular synthesizer, an instrument sometimes believed to be the world's first analog synthesizer. As the creators' vision for the Buchla 100 was to provide a new way of creating music, the instrument lacked a black-and-white keyboard and instead focused on "the movement and manipulation of frequencies." Subotnick recalled: "To me, this was Day Zero for the evolution of music. A new new music. Not a new old music." The composer perceived the instrument to be an opportunity to radicalize traditional high culture, imagining that, if the instrument was inexpensively mass-produced, it would become popular in middle-class American households.

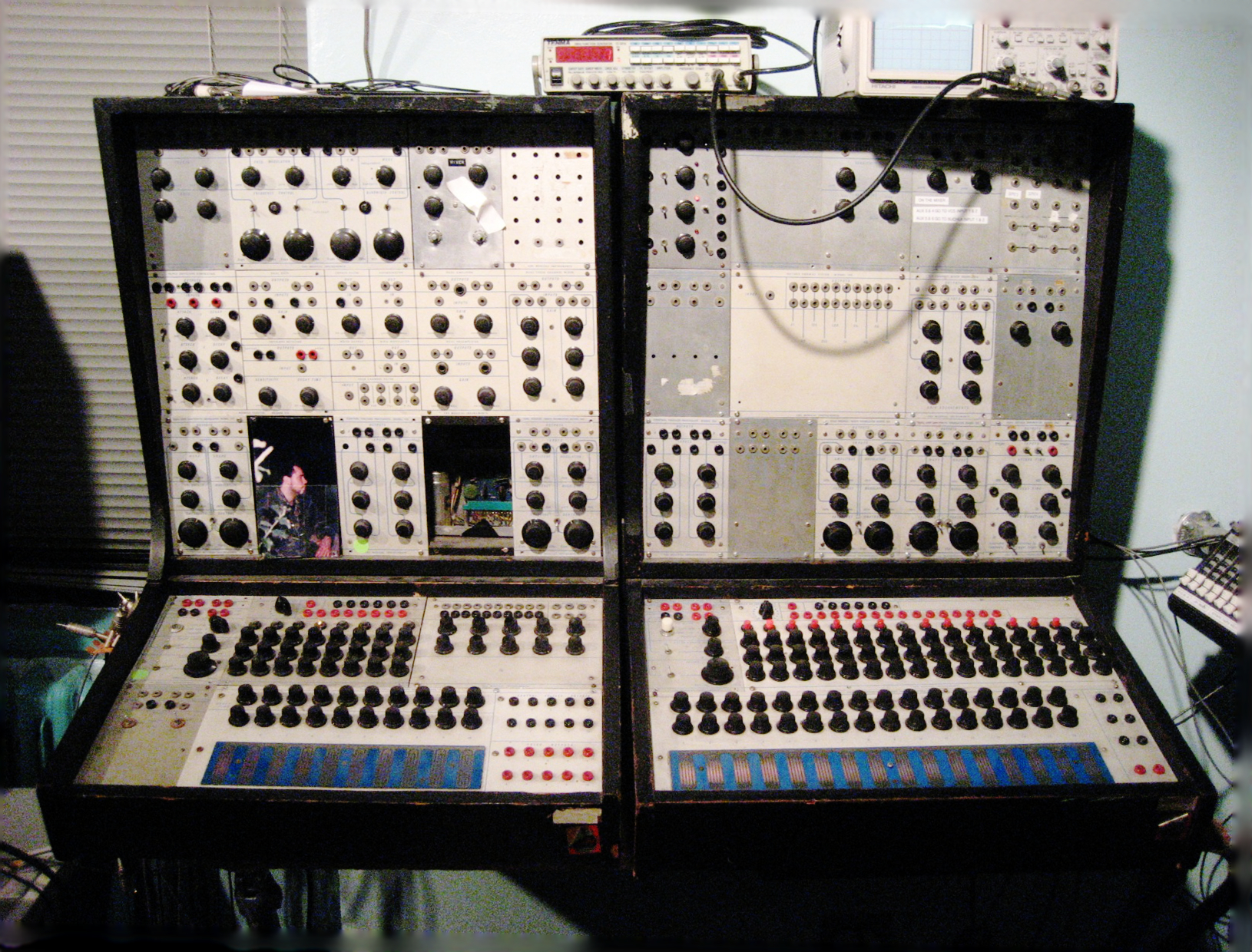
The Buchla 100 synthesizer.

Subotnick moved to New York City in 1966 to work at Lincoln Center and became a resident artist at New York University. Suspicious of institutional settings, he requested off-campus space and located a studio on Bleecker Street, in the centre of the city's downtown scene. Around this period, Jac Holzman, an executive from Nonesuch Records, visited Subotnick in the middle of the night, and offered him $500 to create an electronic album for the label. Subotnick had not heard of the label and, believing Holzman to be joking, kicked him out. The following day, the composer realized the label was real when he noticed he had a Nonesuch release of the Brandenburg Concertos in his collection. Although Subotnick thought he had "really blown it", having been unable to find a telephone number for the label, Holzman returned with a new offer of $1,000, which Subotnick accepted.

Silver Apples of the Moon thus became the first electronic album commissioned by a major label, and the first electronic piece conceived specifically for the LP record format. During the production of Silver Apples, Columbia Records offered Subotnick a contract, but as he was on Nonesuch's roster he turned them down. He nonetheless felt that "I must have been unique to these people at that point because two different record companies came to me for the same thing."

== Production ==
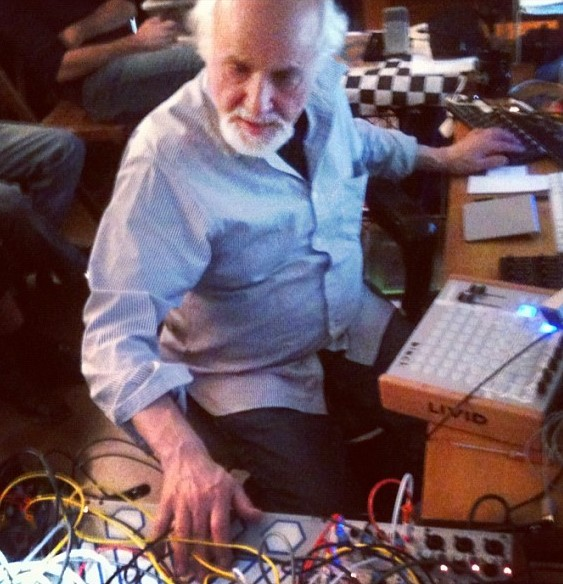
Morton Subotnick (pictured with a Buchla 200e in 2012) sought to create an album with inimitable sounds.

Subotnick was given a 13-month deadline by Nonesuch to complete Silver Apples of the Moon, and he recorded it in the studio at New York University's School of the Arts over 1966–67, working for 10–12 hours a day. The album incorporates a replica of the original Buchla 100, built for Subotnick by Buchla for the composer to take to New York. Subotnick used two two-track tape recorders, one which recorded and played back and another which only provided playback. He kept track of production notes in several notebooks which he updated daily. Although he did not hire a producer, he felt that playing his in-progress work to audiences provided him with the same effect.

Subotnick felt he was not using the Buchla 100 on Silver Apples to create music, but rather to offer "a kind of sound that you would find it very hard to replicate." The instrument provided him with a wholly new way to create electronic music. He said: "I purposefully did not know what results I was after. I believed that with this new instrument, we were in a new period for composition, that the composer had the potential for being a studio artist, being composer, performer and audience all at once, conceiving the idea, creating and performing the idea, and then stepping back and becoming critical of the results." He considered the album to be "pretty complex" for a debut piece, commenting that "I was offering something that isn't easy to do, but that was the point."

Subotnick worked on the piece in sections, each of which could take up to eight weeks until he felt he had fully realized them. After completing sections, he would record them onto tape, notate the patch so he could resume work later on, and put them aside, allowing him to re-patch the synthesizer to work on other elements. Production was stressful for the composer; as Silver Apples was the first electronic album to use a voltage-controlled synthesizer, Subotnick had no model on how to create it. Fine-tuning the Buchla until a desired sound was achieved could take up to ten hours a day, after which the composer made records and diagrams of what sounds were achieved with each knob. He would then record these sounds onto the only tape recorder that would record, and then, in his own words, "set another patch in motion and eventually record that mixed with what you had—mix the new one—with what you had on the old one, either to do it over the top of it or to dovetail or something like that."

== Composition ==
Silver Apples of the Moon is split into two separate parts, "Part I" and "Part II", with each part taking up one side of the vinyl record; Subotnick decided that "Part I" would explore pitch, whereas "Part II" would explore rhythm and pulse. The movements of the record are not necessarily presented in the order they were worked on, as the composer's production approach was to create musical sections in "gobs." On the album sleeve, Subotnick wrote that the record was intended to be experienced by listeners individually or in small groups listening in intimate surroundings, describing this as "a kind of chamber music 20th-century style." He referred to this intention as a "rather special frame of reference" when writing the album, and later explained that the record was intended to be heard as a "trip" or "voyage." The entirely electronic album uses only the Buchla 100 and no other instrumentation, as the composer intended the album to be one of his "models" for showing "how synthesis could be used to create daring new musical languages."

The record is considered to be experimental in style. According to writer Kevin Lozano, the sounds on Silver Apples of the Moon resemble "the byproduct of an experiment gone wrong: Its eerie tones, elliptical pulses, enigmatic thumps, and waves of cybertronic wails are still otherworldly." Unlike other contemporary synthesizer works, the album incorporates hooks into its experimentation with ostinatos and riffs. The usage of the Buchla 100 also enabled the album's improvisatory feel, highlighting the influence of Pauline Oliveros' "intuitive approach". Oliveros, one of Subotnick's colleagues, later said of his music from the period: "Sequencing now is something anyone can do anytime, anywhere. But this was the first time that you could do it in this way. He certainly made a great use of it and advised [Don Buchla] in that direction, I'm sure. Because before that, he was cutting and splicing tape."

"[T]he big thing on the second side is that there’s only one section on it. It's completely different from the first side. It still has the 'silver apples' at the beginning and the end but it grows into this one big thing that reaches and grows into this big climax. It's a completely different gestural environment from the other side."

— Morton Subotnick

Running for over sixteen minutes, "Part I" is a slow, moody section, incorporating 'pinprick' tones which move around the stereo field, and calm passages which are abruptly interrupted by electronic noise. The track makes wide-ranging usage of glissandi, whistles, sirens and other sounds and tones, and also incorporates irregular sections and "capricious shapes." The "atomized melodies, eerie sighs [and] hissing explosions of sound" are reminiscent of early electronic compositions by Milton Babbitt and Karlheinz Stockhausen. The introduction to the piece, featuring undulating pitches that rise and fall, was the first part of the album recorded. A rhythm in the middle of the track emerges alongside numerous high-pitched melodies atop underlying minimal noise, while the coda features low and slow bass tones.

By contrast, "Part II" opens with high-pitched "ding-y" sounds that Subotnick referred to as the sound of "silver apples," and develops a pulse before climaxing with frenzied "proto-club rhythms," with sequences pasted over a steady ostinato. "Beeps and bleeps" are played atop the sequenced phrases. Underlying the track is an ever-rising whirring that varies in pitch against numerous sounds which "flash" in and out of the piece. Sequenced synthesizer phrases were an innovation at the time. According to writer Alfred Hickling, "[t]his had simply never been heard before. Early electronic compositions were mostly about sine waves, oscillations, timbre – all devoid of rhythm, by and large." Subotnick nonetheless said his discovery of these rhythms happened almost by accident: "In the early days, it took a long, long time – sometimes even days – to programme a sequence. Quite unintentionally, I found I had created this pulsating rhythm. I started grooving with it – and it blew my mind."

== Title and packaging ==
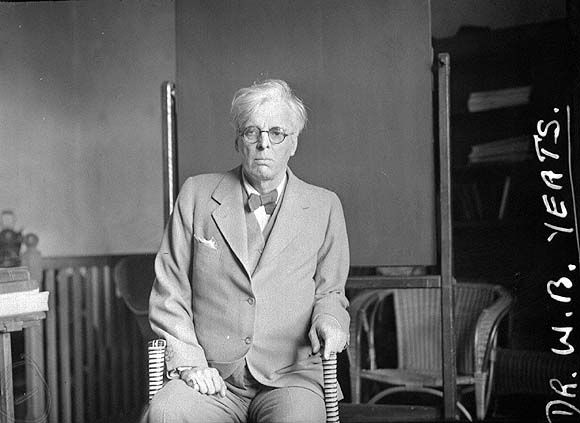
Silver Apples of the Moon takes its name from a line in "The Song of Wandering Aengus" by William Butler Yeats (pictured).

Subotnick named Silver Apples of the Moon in reference to a line from "The Song of Wandering Aengus" by poet W. B. Yeats: "The silver apples of the moon, the golden apples of the sun." The musician said at the time that the name was chosen because he felt it aptly reflected the composition's unifying theme, which he said was "heard in its pure form at the end of 'Part II'." He nonetheless commented later that the name did not "really mean anything," and instead chose it as he liked the sound of it. In another account, the composer said the name was chosen as a metaphor for certain sounds on the album:

The last two lines of the poem are ‘The silver apples of the moon, / The golden apples of the sun’. I could have used ‘golden apples of the sun’ but I had these little ding-y pitches, this little pingy stuff, and that’s one of the sounds that I didn’t really perfect until Until Spring and then really perfected them on A Sky of Cloudless Sulphur. It took a long time to figure out how to get exactly what I wanted. But I had the beginnings of it, and those are those little ding-y, high pitched silver-like sounds—they sound like...little...silver apples!...so that’s what attracted me to the title, to that line in the poem."

Robert Hunter named the Grateful Dead song "Silver Apples of the Moon" from the band's 1991 album Infrared Roses after Subotnick's album. English band Laika also named their 1994 album Silver Apples of the Moon after Subotnick's album. The album sleeve features a psychedelic design by William S. Harvey, incorporating artwork by Anthony Martin.

== Release and reception ==
Prior to its release, Subotnick played Silver Apples of the Moon at the opening night of the famous New York nightclub Electric Circus in June 1967, where the composition was enhanced by the usage of strobe lights. Attendees included conductor Seiji Ozawa, writer Tom Wolfe, and several members of the Kennedy family. The attendees danced to the music, which dumbfounded Subotnick, but he was pleased they enjoyed the "pulse" of the music. He later recalled: "I mean, I knew it had a beat, but I'd never heard of people dancing to that." Robert Barry of The Quietus believes that, with this, "Subotnick might just have been the first person to get a club full of people [...] dancing to purely electronic music."

Upon its release in July 1967, Silver Apples of the Moon was a surprise hit for Nonesuch, becoming one of the best-selling records in the classical category, and also selling respectably for an experimental album. The record also became an underground hit, and was described by Alfred Hickling of The Guardian as swiftly becoming "an essential psychedelic soundtrack," although Subotnick said he did not take drugs during the production of the album. For developing upon the possibilities of voltage-based synthesizers in performance and recording, Silver Apples also received international attention. Subotnick felt thought the album's innovative electronic sounds were part of the record's success. The album also received critical acclaim. Composer Tod Dockstader in Electronic Music Review described Silver Apples of the Moon as a "beautiful record" that "seems to glitter with precision."

Fellow New York-based electronic musician Wendy Carlos, a design consultant and early exponent of the Moog synthesizer, also reviewed the album for Electronic Music Review. Although she hailed Subotnick as a "very talented" composer and felt the album to be among the prettiest electronic works, she nonetheless felt it was a "bore" that was too long "for a single electronic composition of this style and type." She also derided what she felt were inexpressive phrasings and articulations, feeling that "they either sound inflexible and mechanical, or aleatoric and unimportant." Although Silver Apples of the Moon pre-dated recordings containing the Moog by about a year, it was soon overshadowed by the popularity of Carlos' own 1968 album Switched-On Bach, which featured works by Johann Sebastian Bach played on the Moog. Switched-On Bach would become one of the best-selling classical albums of all time. Subotnick, in turn, was unimpressed with Carlos' album: "I could never see the point in playing old music on a new invention. If I'm going to play Bach, I'd rather use a harpsichord." The popularity of the Moog itself, which featured a keyboard unlike the Buchla, helped render the Buchla a niche instrument used largely by academic composers, despite the acclaim that Silver Apples of the Moon received.

The original tapes of Silver Apples of the Moon and its follow-up The Wild Bull (1968) were digitally remastered and re-released by WERGO in 1993. In a review of the remastered edition, Blair Anderson of AllMusic praised side one of the album, commenting on its "fascinating vocabulary" and writing that interest is sustained by the variety of gestures and tones. He nonetheless felt the second side was weaker, as it consisted of "rather predictable sequences over a steady ostinato". Julian Cope wrote in a retrospective review that the album reflected Subotnick's interest in both technology and music, and described it as an "unsung" release.

== Legacy ==
Silver Apples of the Moon is celebrated as a landmark in the history of electronic music, being hailed as an important electronic composition that received significant sales despite being experimental in style. Not only was Silver Apples the first electronic composition composed exclusively for the album format, but Lozano also argues it to be the first electronic dance music album, highlighting how the album's "ghostly chorus of beats and rhythms" predicted the development of techno in the 1980s. Hickling writes that the album is revered among synthesists for being an important influence on techno. It was also the first electronic album made using a voltage-based synthesizer, and the first large-scale classical composition to have premiered with a recording on a physical release, rather than with a live performance, highlighting what writer Joseph Morpurgo felt was "a significant shift of gravity away from a culture of performance towards a culture of playback."

"The Buchla might not have caught on, but that didn't stop Subotnick making full use of it. Almost 50 years on, Silver Apples of the Moon still sounds arrestingly contemporary."

— Alfred Hickling, The Guardian

It was Subotnick's first widely recognised work, and brought the composer celebrity. The rhythmic second side of the album attracted the attention of rock bands the Grateful Dead and the Mothers of Invention, who began spending time with Subotnick at his studio. The composer was worried his work would be treated as gimmickry, and he turned down two opportunities to appear on The Tonight Show Starring Johnny Carson. Of all of Subotnick's pieces, Silver Apples remains the work he has remained mostly closely associated with, something he is pleased with. He said of the composition: "It's not a bad little piece. It's like a jazz composition. I'll start out with some of the familiar riffs, then just improvise. It keeps on changing whenever I perform it." Composer Rhys Chatham said he "hadn't heard anything like it before," and named it one of his 13 favourite albums in a list for The Quietus. Subotnick predicted the album would anticipate more art music than he felt it actually did, recalling: "I knew that I was making, more or less, high art music. I thought that there would be more interest in fine art music than actually happened."

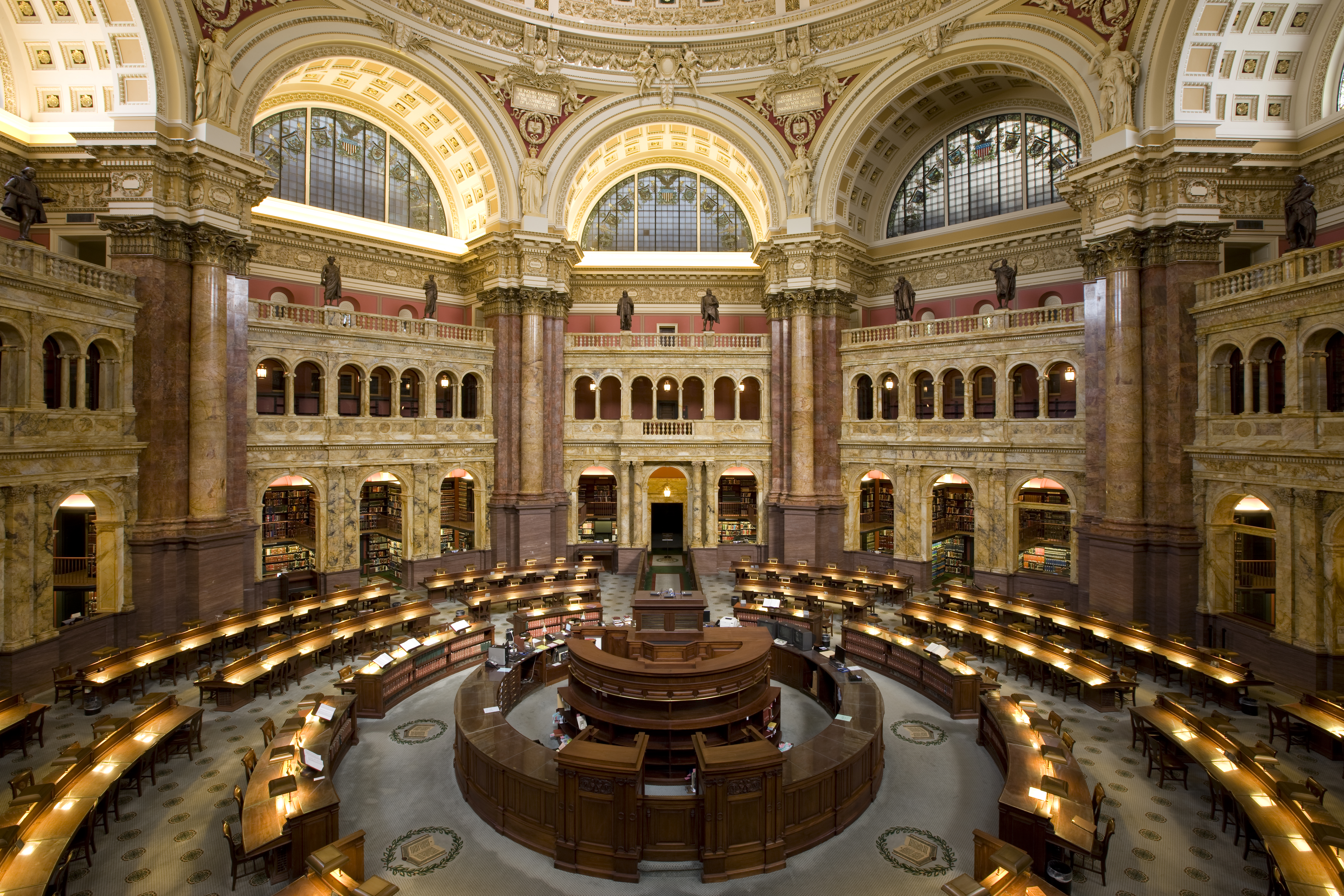
Silver Apples of the Moon is archived at the Library of Congress (pictured).

In 1992, The Wire ranked the album as one of the "100 Most Important Records Ever Made". In 2014, Fact included the album in their list of "The greatest electronic albums of the 1950s and 1960s", with contributor Joseph Morpurgo describing the significant work as "an involving set of fizz-bang electronics." In 2015, Spin included it in a list of the 1960s' greatest alternative albums, where the editors called it an "electronic masterpiece" and Subotnick's "major statement, a manifesto on behalf of the idea that electronic music need not be forever 'otherwordly [sic]' in its textures or rhythms." In 2017, Pitchfork ranked it at number 83 in their list of "The 200 Best Albums of the 1960s". In its accompanying write-up, Kevin Lozano wrote that: "In a decade dedicated to the exploration of the fringes, of moon landings and subatomic exploration, Silver Apples was another attempt to break open the door into the future and walk on through."

In 2009, it was one of 50 recordings chosen by the United States Library of Congress to be added to the National Recording Registry, which selects recordings annually that are "culturally, historically, or aesthetically significant". BBC Radio 3 count the album among their "Fifty Modern Classics", and in an accompanying 2012 documentary, author Rob Young celebrated the album while Four Tet explained how the album stood out to him as a classic. On January 19, 2018, ARTnews hosted a symposium on the album at New York University, with the help of NYU Music Technology and the Humanities Initiative, to commemorate the album's 50th anniversary. A documentary on Subotnick, also named Subotnick, was also released as part of the album's anniversary celebrations, alongside vinyl and CD re-issues of the album. Subtonick performed Silver Apples of the Moon at Adelaide Festival on 7 March 2014, using a re-creation of the first Buchla (the original is housed in the Library of Congress). He also performed the piece at the REDCAT theatre in Los Angeles on February 13, 2018, to commemorate its 50th birthday.

== Track listing ==
All tracks written by Morton Subotnick

=== Side one ===
1. "Part I" – 16:33

=== Side two ===
1. "Part II" – 14:52

== Personnel ==
- Morton Subotnick - Buchla 100 modular synthesizer, liner notes, primary artist
- Bradford Ellis - Digital restoration, mastering, remixing
- Michael Hoenig - mastering, remixing
- H.J. Kropp - cover design
- Tony Martin - illustrations

== See also ==
- Switched-On Bach
- Wendy Carlos
