= Ramón Sender (composer) =

Spanish and American composer (born 1934)

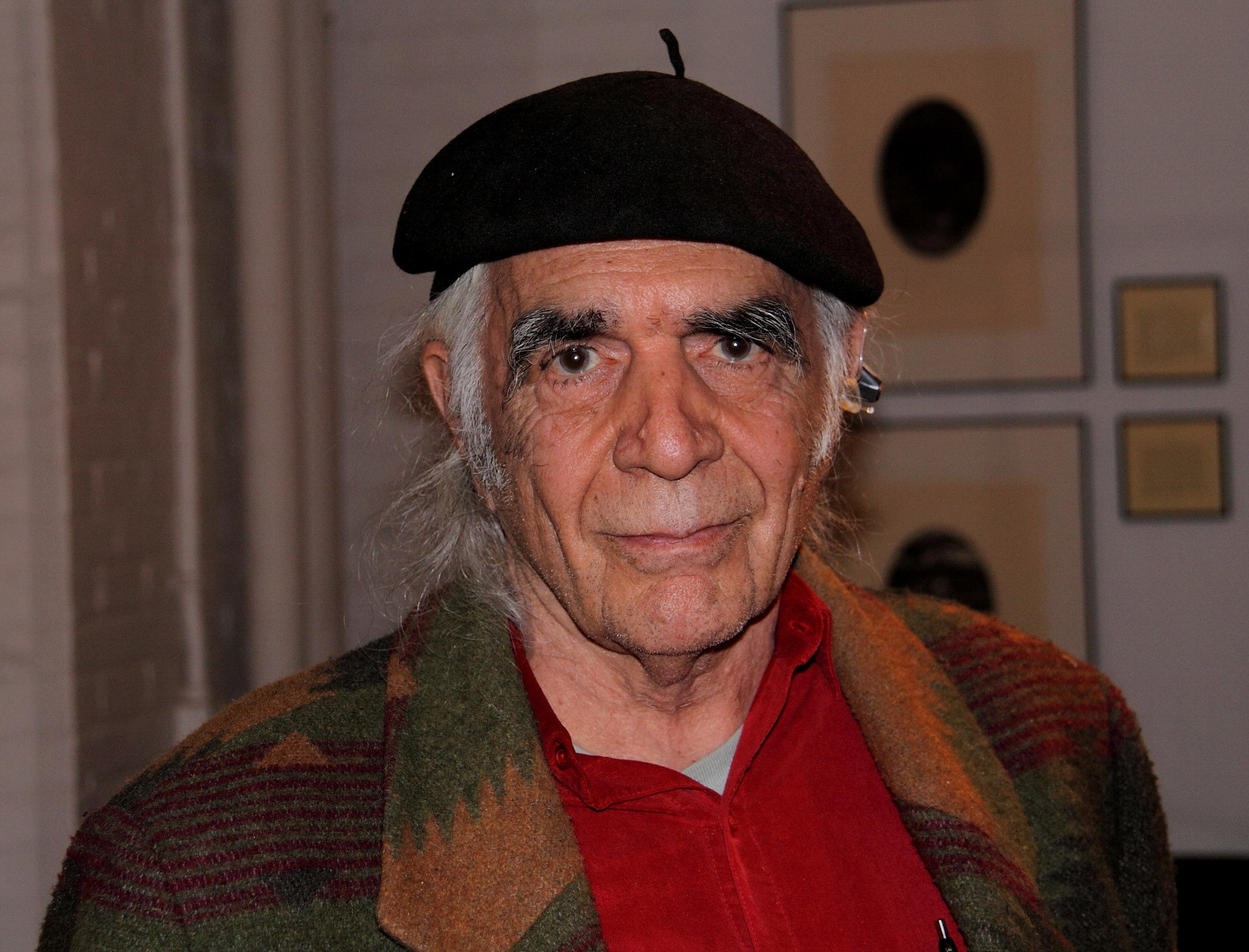
Sender at Arion Press in San Francisco, 2011

Ramón Sender Barayón (born October 29, 1934) is a Spanish and American composer, visual artist and writer. He is the son of the Spanish novelist Ramón J. Sender and of Amparo Barayón, who was executed by Francisco Franco's forces during the Spanish Civil War.

In 1962, Sender co-founded the San Francisco Tape Music Center with Morton Subotnick, and he took part with Subotnick and Don Buchla in the development of the Buchla 100 modular synthesizer. His electronic and mixed-media works from this period include Desert Ambulance and Tropical Fish Opera.

After co-producing the 1966 Trips Festival in San Francisco, Sender left the city for the open land communes of western Sonoma County, where he lived and wrote for more than a decade. He returned to San Francisco in 1980 and turned increasingly to writing. His best-known book, A Death in Zamora (1989), investigates his mother's killing and has been treated by historians of the Spanish Civil War as a record of both the war and early Spanish feminism.

== Early life and education ==
Sender was born in Madrid and left Spain during the civil war that followed the military coup of 1936. He studied piano with George Copeland, harmony with Elliott Carter, and counterpoint and fugue with Harold Shapero between 1948 and 1951.

He attended the Conservatorio di Santa Cecilia in Rome and Columbia University in New York, where he studied with Henry Cowell. He went on to study with Robert Erickson at the San Francisco Conservatory of Music from 1959 to 1962, and with Darius Milhaud at Mills College. Sender holds a Bachelor of Music from the San Francisco Conservatory of Music and an M.A. from Mills College.

== San Francisco Tape Music Center ==
Sender co-founded the San Francisco Tape Music Center with Morton Subotnick in 1962. Over the following four years he collaborated there with composers and visual artists including Pauline Oliveros, Tony Martin, Joseph Byrd, Terry Riley and William Maginnis. In 1966 the Center moved to Mills College, where it was renamed the Center for Contemporary Music and remains in operation.

With Subotnick and Don Buchla, Sender took part in the design of the Buchla 100, among the earliest voltage-controlled music synthesizers.

== Open land communes ==
In January 1966, Sender co-produced the Trips Festival with Ken Kesey and Stewart Brand, a three-day event that drew together much of the emerging hippie movement in San Francisco.

That April he became the first resident of Lou Gottlieb's Morning Star Ranch, which became an open land commune the following year. After Sonoma County authorities bulldozed the residents' dwellings, he moved to the Wheeler Ranch near Occidental. Both properties later returned to private ownership. Sender remained in the area until 1980.

Among the residents at Wheeler Ranch was Alicia Bay Laurel, author of the 1970 best-seller Living on the Earth. The two collaborated on Being of the Sun (1973), a book covering homemade music, drones, modes and open tunings as means of spiritual practice, alongside material on yoga, ritual and the forming of intentional communities. A 1973 reel-to-reel recording of the two performing songs and chants from the book was issued by Laurel in 2013 as Songs from Being of the Sun.

During the late 1970s Sender helped found the Occidental Community Choir, writing original music and working as a choral arranger. The choir's recording of his arrangement of Laurel's song "In the Morning" appears on her album Music from Living on the Earth. In 2006, the producer and bassist Nicholas Alva created a musical drawing on the history of the two communes and including songs by Sender.

Sender later co-curated "The Hippies," an exhibition on the history of the west Sonoma County open land communes held at the West County Museum in Sebastopol from October 2016 to March 2017.

== Later career ==
Sender returned to San Francisco in 1980 and married Judith Levy-Sender. Together they founded the Odd Mondays speaker series, which they ran for eighteen years before handing it to a new producer.

His visual work is collected in the 2009 book Barayon: A Catalog of Prints, Drawings, Original Art, based on a one-man show at the Gallery Sanchez in 2008.

After the death of his daughter Xaverie in 1989, Sender founded the Peregrine Foundation, which supports people living in or leaving experimental social groups. He administered the foundation until 1999 and published four book-length autobiographies by women who had left the Bruderhof community, in a series titled "Women from Utopia."

In 2018 the Spanish documentary filmmaker Luis Olano released Sender Barayón: Un Viaje Hacia La Luz (A Trip into the Light), a film on Sender's life and work combining interviews at his home in San Francisco with archival photographs, footage and recordings of his music. The film carries English subtitles for Spanish dialogue and Spanish subtitles for English, and has screened in both the United States and Spain.

== Writing ==
To distinguish himself from his father, Sender uses the Spanish-style compound name Ramón Sender Barayón, which also honors his mother.

His novel Zero Weather appeared in 1980, followed by Zero Summer in 1984. Several other manuscripts remain unpublished, and a number of his short stories appear on his website. He has published an anthology of short stories and essays, A Planetary Sojourn, and a novel drawn from his years at the Tape Music Center, Naked Close Up, issued in 2012 as an ebook by Intelligent Arts, a project of the Electronic Music Foundation.

=== A Death in Zamora ===
In 1989 Sender published A Death in Zamora, an investigation into the execution of his mother, Amparo Barayón, by Franco's forces during the Spanish Civil War. The book has been read both as a record of the war and as an account of early feminism and resistance to patriarchy in Spain, in which Barayón was a participant. An updated edition published in 2018, based on the 2017 Spanish edition from Post-Metropolis Editorial, includes essays by the Spanish Civil War historians Paul Preston, Helen Graham and Francisco Espinosa Maestre. His cousin Mercedes Kemp worked as a translator on the edition.

== Selected works ==
- "Four Sanskrit Hymns", four singers, four cellos, double bass, harp, piano, celesta, three percussionists, tape (1961)
- "Kore", tape (1961)
- "Traversals", tape (1961)
- "Tropical Fish Opera", four instruments (1962)
- "Time Fields", sextet (1962)
- "Kronos", tape (1962)
- "Balances", amplified string quartet with double bass (1964)
- "Desert Ambulance", amplified accordion, voice, three-track tape, projections (1964)
- "In the Garden", clarinet, viola, projections and tape (1965)
- "Enoughing", tape (1968)
- "Ushas", tape (1968)
- "Xmas Me", tape (1968)
- "Outdoor Music for Four Open-tuned Autoharps" (1970)
- Loopy Gamelans on 'A' and 'B', four performers (1976)
- "64 I Ching Chants" (1976)
- "A Tewa Prayer", mixed chorus (1978)
- "I Have a Dream", mixed chorus (1978)
- "Audition", two open-tuned autoharps and dilruba (1982)
- "Aidan's Gamelan (in memory of Lou Harrison)", tuned water drums with pre-recorded tape (2003)

== Discography ==
- Desert Ambulance (Locust 70, 2005)
- Worldfood (Locust 55, 2004)
- Songs from Being of the Sun, with Alicia Bay Laurel (Indigo With Stars, 2013)
- Various works on the DVD accompanying David W. Bernstein's The San Francisco Tape Music Center: 1960s Counterculture and the Avant-Garde (University of California Press, 2008) ISBN 9780520248922
- Music from Mills (Mills MC 001, 1986), anthology including an excerpt from "Audition"

== Books ==
- Being of the Sun (1973), with Alicia Bay Laurel
- The Morning Star Scrapbook (1976)
- Zero Weather (1980)
- Zero Summer (1984)
- The Guide to Everwhere (1988)
- A Death in Zamora (1989; new edition 2019)
- Catalog of Prints, Drawings, Original Art (2009)
- A Planetary Sojourn (2010)
- Naked Close Up (2012)
- Home Free Home: A History of Morning Star and Wheeler Communes (2018)
- Morning Star and Wheeler's Open Land Communes: A Brief Run-Through (2018)
