= Buchla Electronic Musical Instruments =

Synthesizer and MIDI controller manufacturer

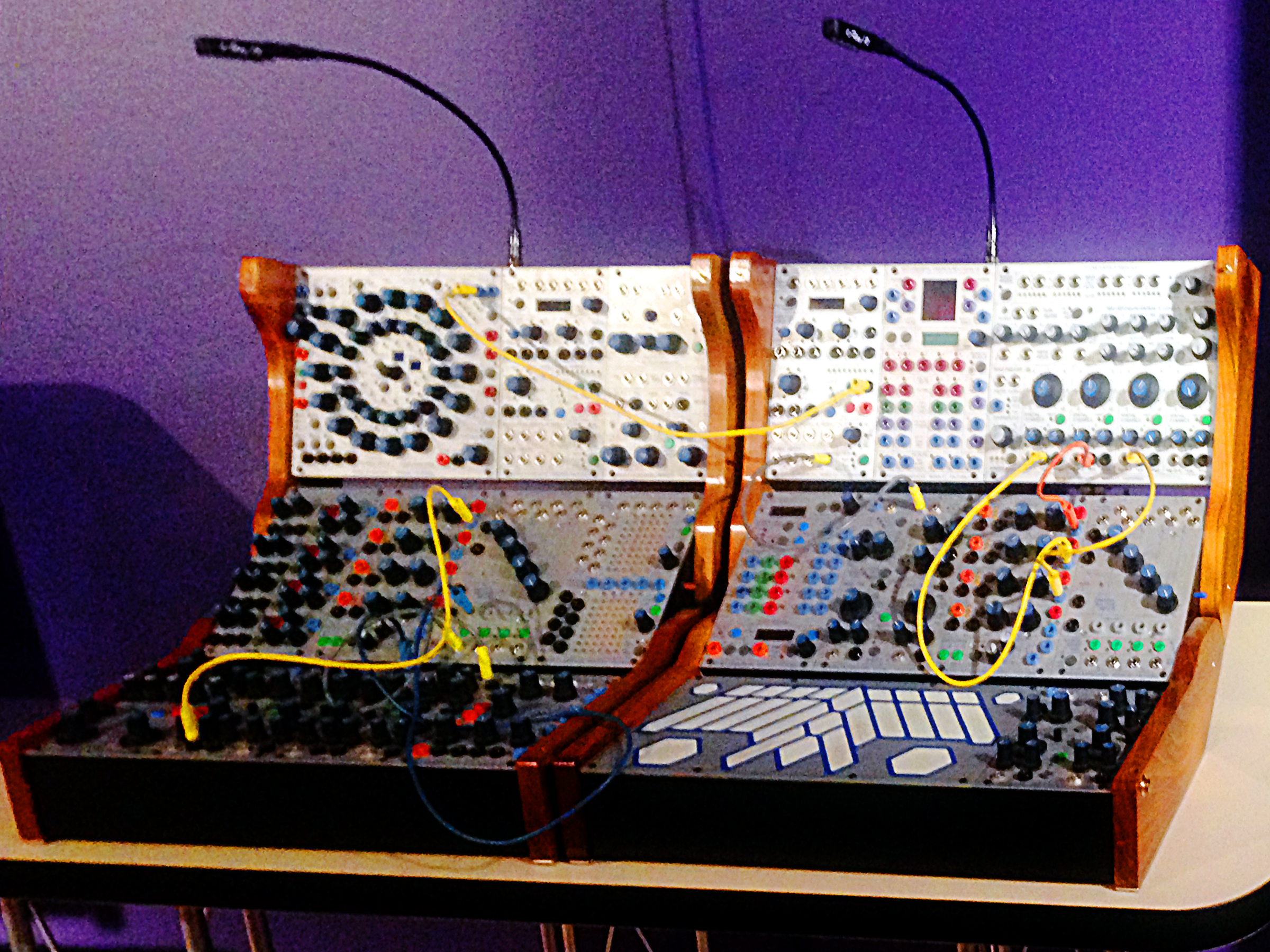
Buchla 200e (2004–) used by Deadmau5 (exhibited at National Music Centre)

Buchla Electronic Musical Instruments (BEMI) was a manufacturer of synthesizers and unique MIDI controllers. The origins of the company could be found in Buchla & Associates, created in 1963 by synthesizer pioneer Don Buchla of Berkeley, California. In 2012 the original company led by Don Buchla was acquired by a group of Australian investors trading as Audio Supermarket Pty. Ltd. The company was renamed Buchla Electronic Musical Instruments as part of the acquisition. In 2018 the assets of BEMI were acquired by a new entity, Buchla U.S.A., and the company continues under new ownership.

== Company origin ==
Buchla's first modular electronic music system was the result of a San Francisco Tape Music Center commission by composers Ramon Sender and Morton Subotnick in 1963, who later allotted $500 from a Rockefeller Foundation grant to Buchla in 1964. Subotnick envisioned a voltage-controlled instrument that would allow musicians and composers to create sounds suited to their own specifications. Previously, one had to use either discrete audio generators, such as test oscillators—or musique concrète, manually composed and edited magnetic-tape source recordings of other musical, spoken word, or other audio. Buchla designed the synthesizer in a modular fashion, combining separate components that each generated or modified a music event. Each box served a specific function: envelope generators, oscillators, filters, voltage controlled amplifiers, and analog sequencer modules. Using the different modules, a composer could affect the pitch, timbre, amplitude, and spatial location of the sound. The instrument was controlled and played via an array of touch and pressure-sensitive surfaces.

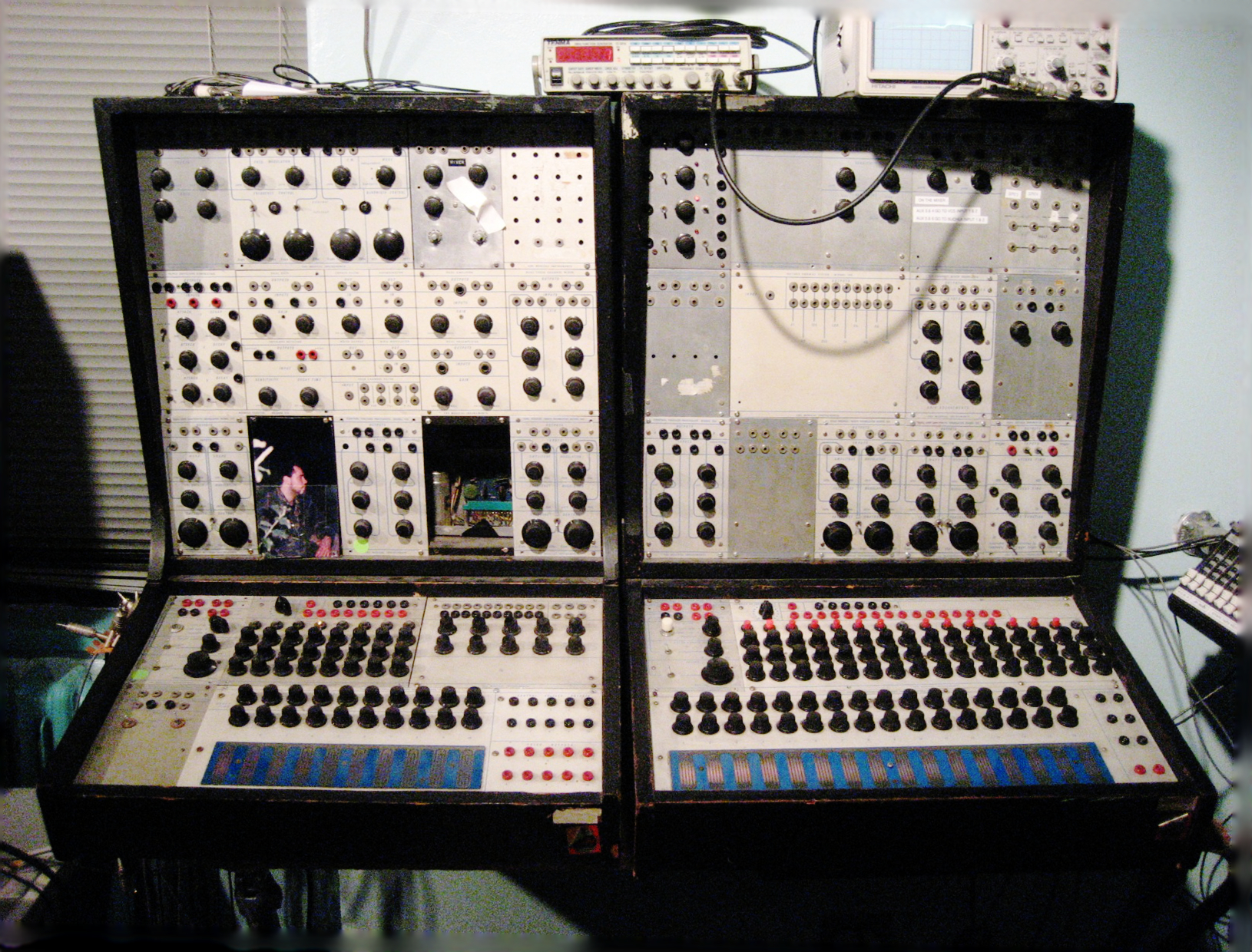
Buchla 100 at NYU

The instrument was named the "Buchla 100 series Modular Electronic Music System," and was installed at the San Francisco Tape Music Center in 1965 and moved to Mills College in 1966. Subotnick completed his first major electronic work, Silver Apples Of The Moon, with another unit that Buchla had built and shipped to New York. This same unit was also used on Buffy Sainte Marie's influential 1969 album, Illuminations. Along with Robert Moog's Moog synthesizer, it helped revolutionize the way electronic music and sounds are made.

== Products ==
=== Buchla 100 series (1960s) ===
The original Buchla modular synthesizer was commissioned by Morton Subotnick and Ramon Sender and funded by a grant from the Rockefeller Foundation. The earliest modules are labeled "San Francisco Tape Music Center." Later modules were offered through the musical instruments division of CBS.

=== Buchla 200 series (1970) ===
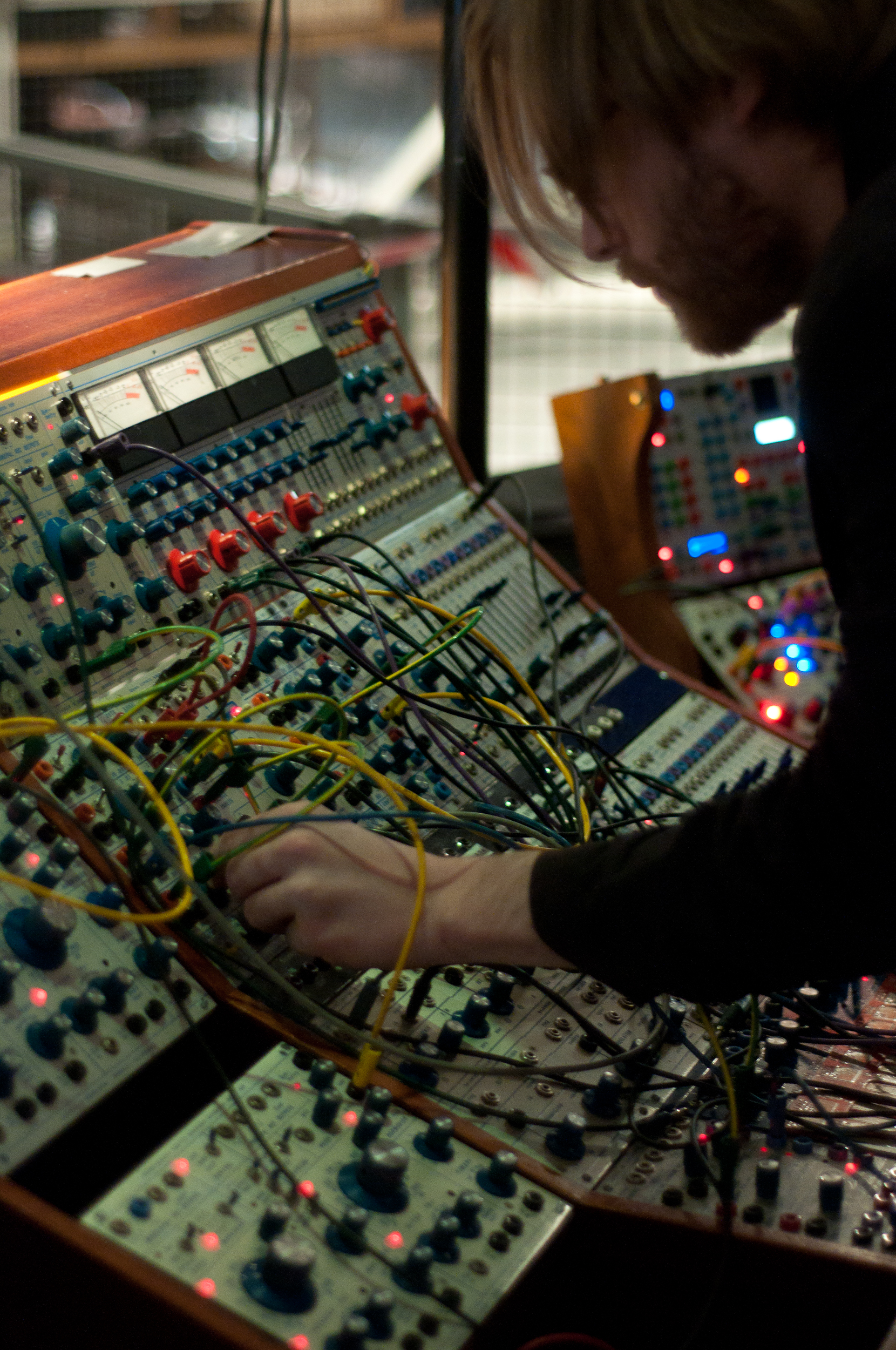
Buchla 200

The Buchla 200 series Electric Music Box replaced the previous model in 1970 and represented a significant advance in technology. Almost every parameter can be controlled from an external control voltage.

=== Computer-controlled instruments ===
Buchla 300, 500, Touché (mid 1970s)
In the mid 1970s, Don Buchla began experimenting with digital designs and computer-controlled systems. The results were the 500 series and the 300 series, both of which paired the new technology with existing 200 series modules to create hybrid analog/digital systems. The Touché was also the result of this research, and was also his final attempt to market a "mainstream" Buchla synth.

Buchla 400, 700, and MIDAS (1980s)
Also in 1980s, Buchla released the 400 series and the 700 series software controlled instruments operated by MIDAS, a Forth language for musical instruments, and also equipped with MIDI.

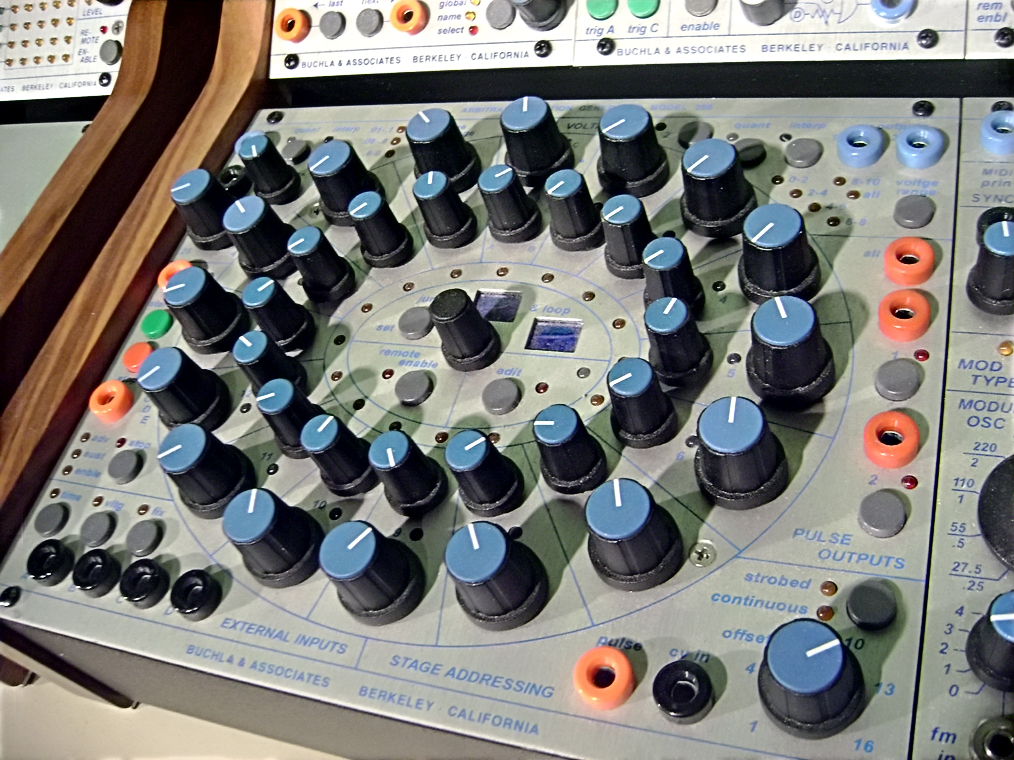
Buchla 250e Arbitrary Function Generator

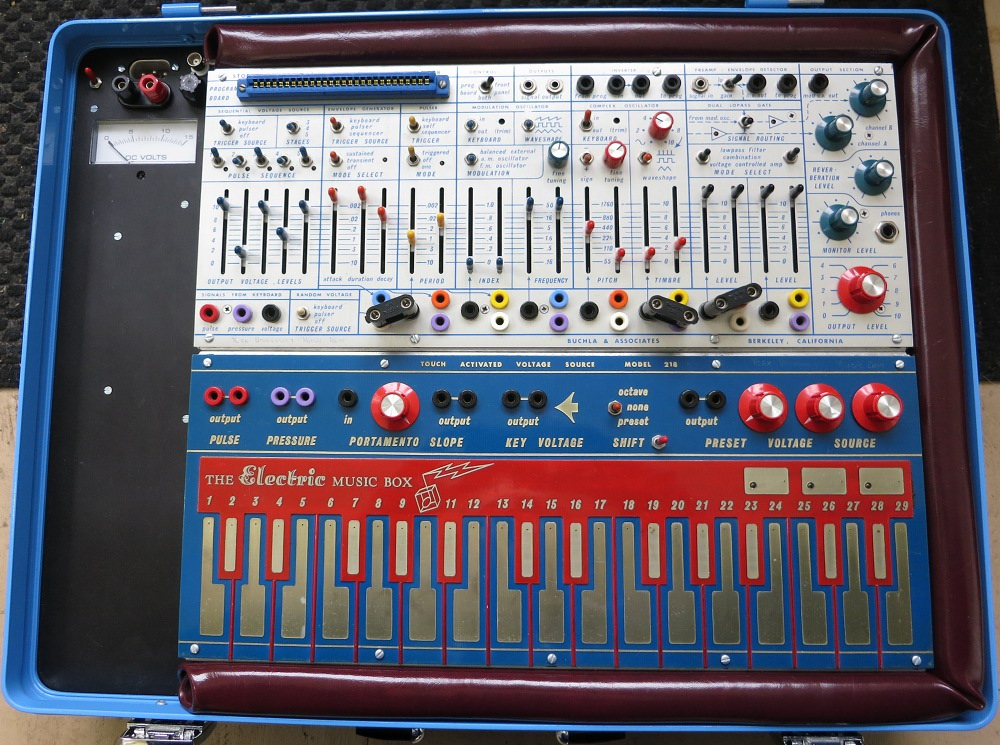
Buchla Music Easel

=== Buchla's unique synthesizer designs ===
Buchla tended to not refer to his instruments as synthesizers, as he felt that name gives the impression of imitating existing sounds/instruments. His intent was to make instruments that create new sounds. This goal is evident in the omission of a standard musical keyboard on his early instruments, which instead used a series of touch plates that were not necessarily tied to equal-tempered tuning.

He also used a naming convention different from most of the industry. One of his modules, for example, is called a "Multiple Arbitrary Function Generator." These differences run deeper than nomenclature. The Multiple Arbitrary Function Generator (or MARF) goes well beyond what a typical sequencer is capable of performing and can act as an envelope generator, LFO, CV selector, voltage quantizer, and tracking generator. The MARF (Buchla model 248) is not to be confused with the modern Dual Arbitrary Function Generator (Model 250e) which features a different design.

Buchla's instruments, such as the Music Easel (pictured), use a method of timbre generation different from Moog synthesizers. Moog units use oscillators with basic function generator-type waveshapes and rely heavily on filtering with 24 dB resonant low-pass filters, while Buchlas are geared toward complex oscillators using frequency modulation, amplitude modulation, and dynamic waveshaping to produce other forms of timbre modulation. Many of Don Buchla's designs, including the Lopass Gates, contain vactrols - photoresistive opto-isolator employed as voltage-controlled potentiometers - which can be used for a more "natural", typical Buchla sound. In December 2017, Arturia released a software/plugin emulation of the Music Easel, called the "Buchla Easel V", as part of the V collection.

=== MIDI controllers (late 1980s) ===
Buchla Thunder, Buchla Lightning, Marimba Lumina

By the late 1980s, Don Buchla had stopped creating instruments and shifted his focus to alternate MIDI controllers. His controller designs have included the Thunder, Lightning, and Marimba Lumina.

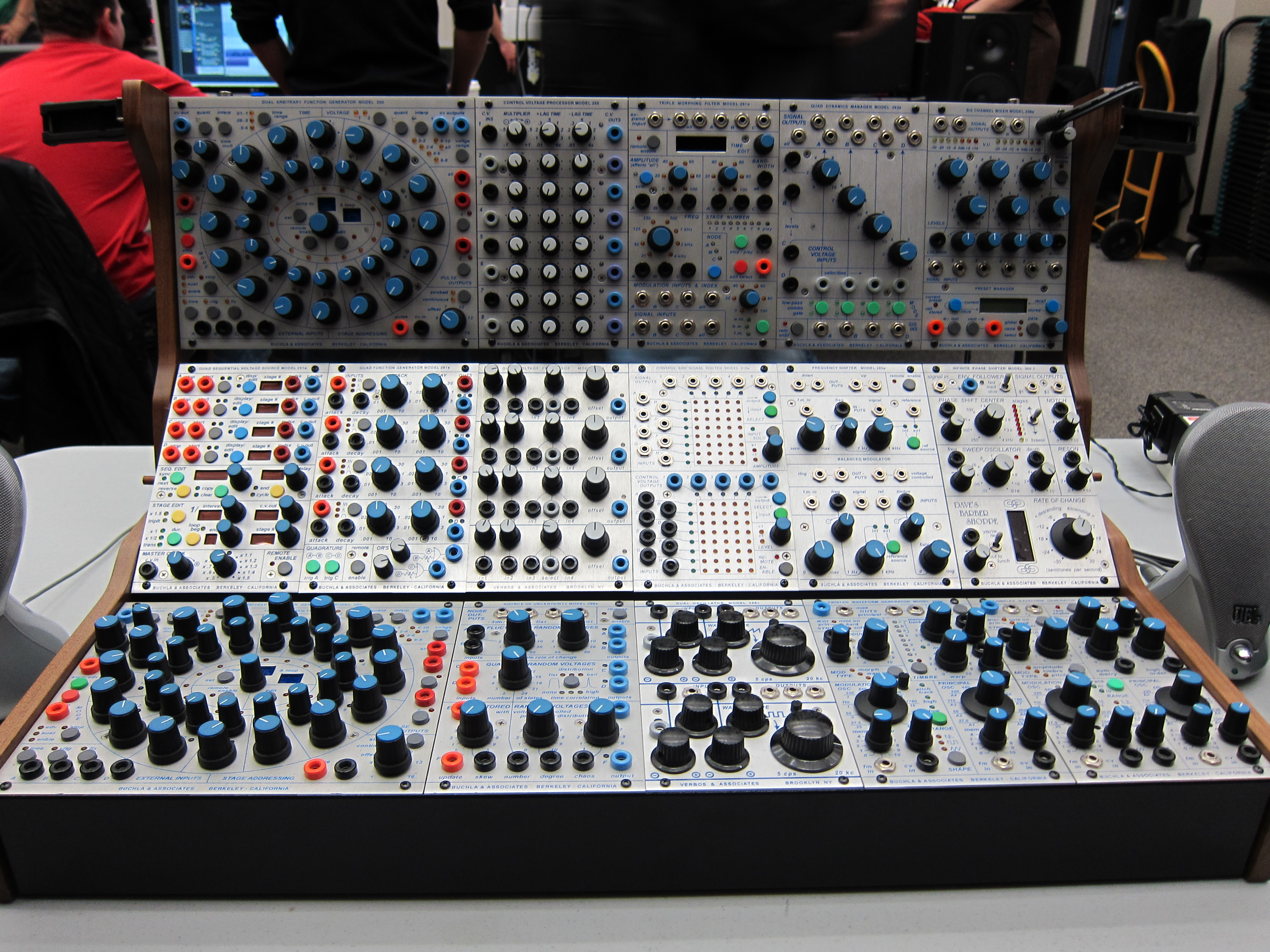
Buchla 200e

=== Buchla 200e series (2004) ===
Finally, in 2004, Don Buchla returned to designing full blown modular electronic instruments with the 200e, a hybrid system using digital microprocessors that uses the same size modules and signals as the 100 and 200 series systems. The 200e modules convert all signals to analog at the panel, appearing to the user like an analog system, with patch cables. Systems can be built using a combination of 100, 200 and 200e modules. The 200e modules connect through a digital communications bus, allowing the system to store the settings of the knobs and switches.

At the January 2012 NAMM Show, Buchla & Associates announced new ownership, retaining Don Buchla as Chief Technology Officer and investment in the design, manufacturing, and marketing of Buchla products and the development of an expanded product line, and the company moving forward under the name Buchla Electronic Musical Instruments (BEMI). One year later, BEMI re-introduced the Music Easel. Since then, BEMI has released a small number of new modules, including the 252e Polyphonic Rhythm Generator. The "200h" series of modules (h = half) were also released to allow Buchla system owners to configure their systems in more granular ways.

== Current status ==
In 2015, various websites, including FACT, reported that Don Buchla had taken the owners of BEMI to court, citing health problems due in part to unpaid consulting fees and asserting a claim to his original intellectual property. The lawsuit alleged breach of contract and "bad-faith conduct" on the part of BEMI's owners and sought $500,000 in compensation.

Legal documents filed with the state of California indicate that the court ordered the case to be settled by arbitration in July 2015. In August 2016, the court dismissed the case in light of the fact that the parties had reached an out-of-court settlement.

Don Buchla died shortly afterward, on September 14, 2016. His obituary was reported in the New York Times and elsewhere, noting his significant achievements to the world of electronic music and technology.

BEMI attended NAMM 2017 and released the Easel AUX Expander. BEMI also established a new distribution model, discontinuing direct sales to customers and integrating more closely with a worldwide network of dealers.

== Gallery ==
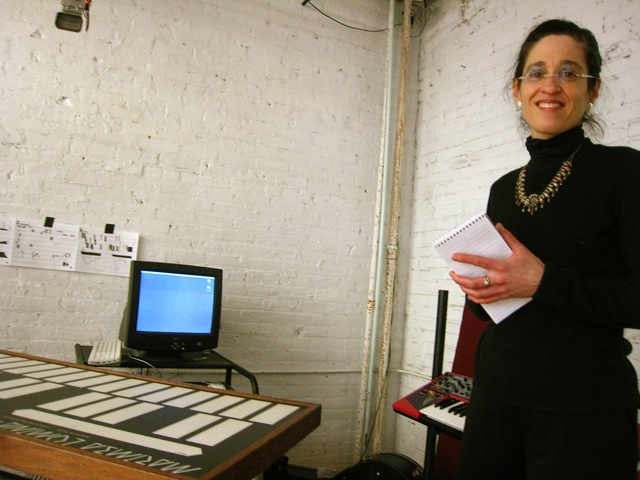
Buchla Marimba Lumina on LEMUR

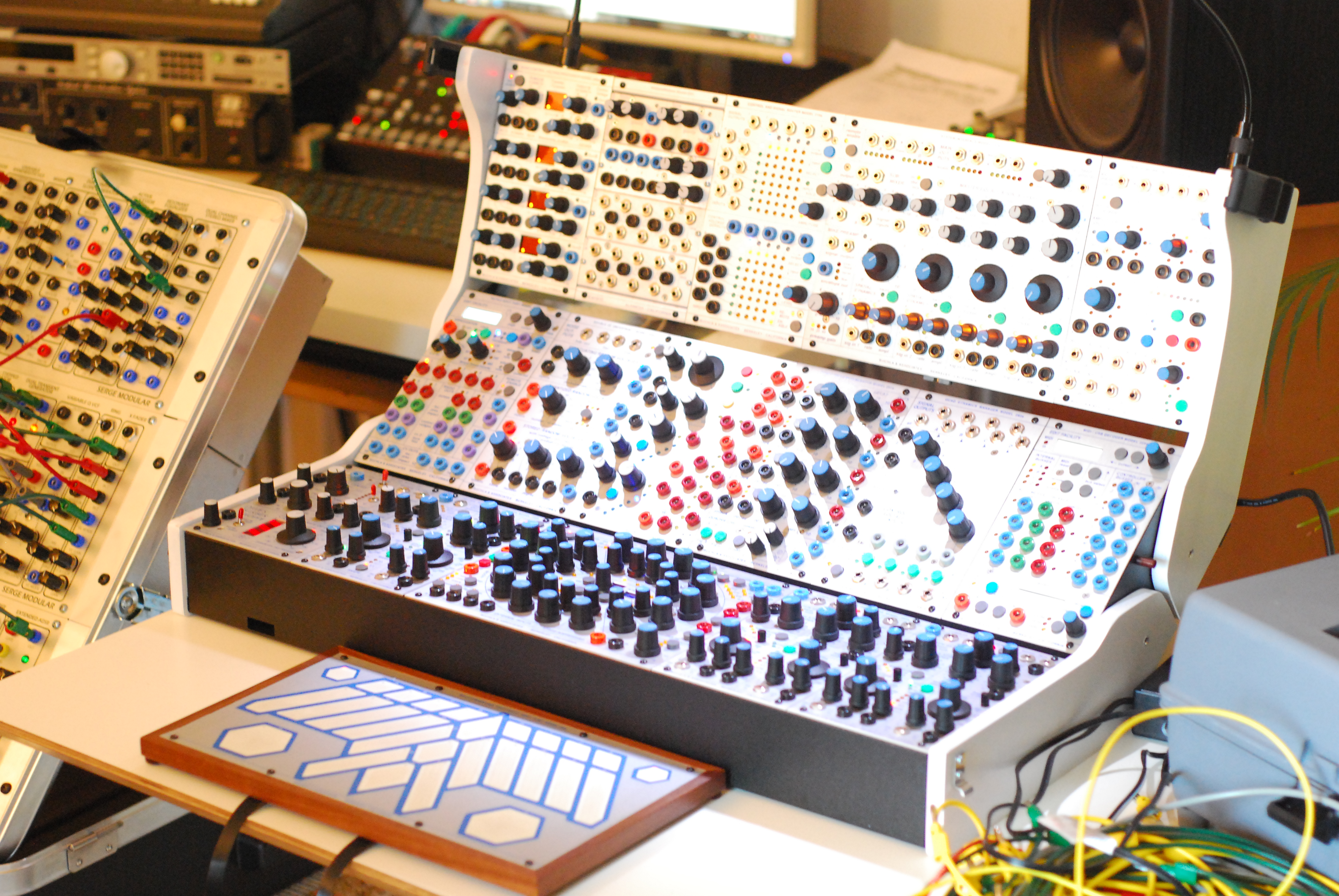
Buchla 200e (rear) with
223e Tactile Input Port (front)

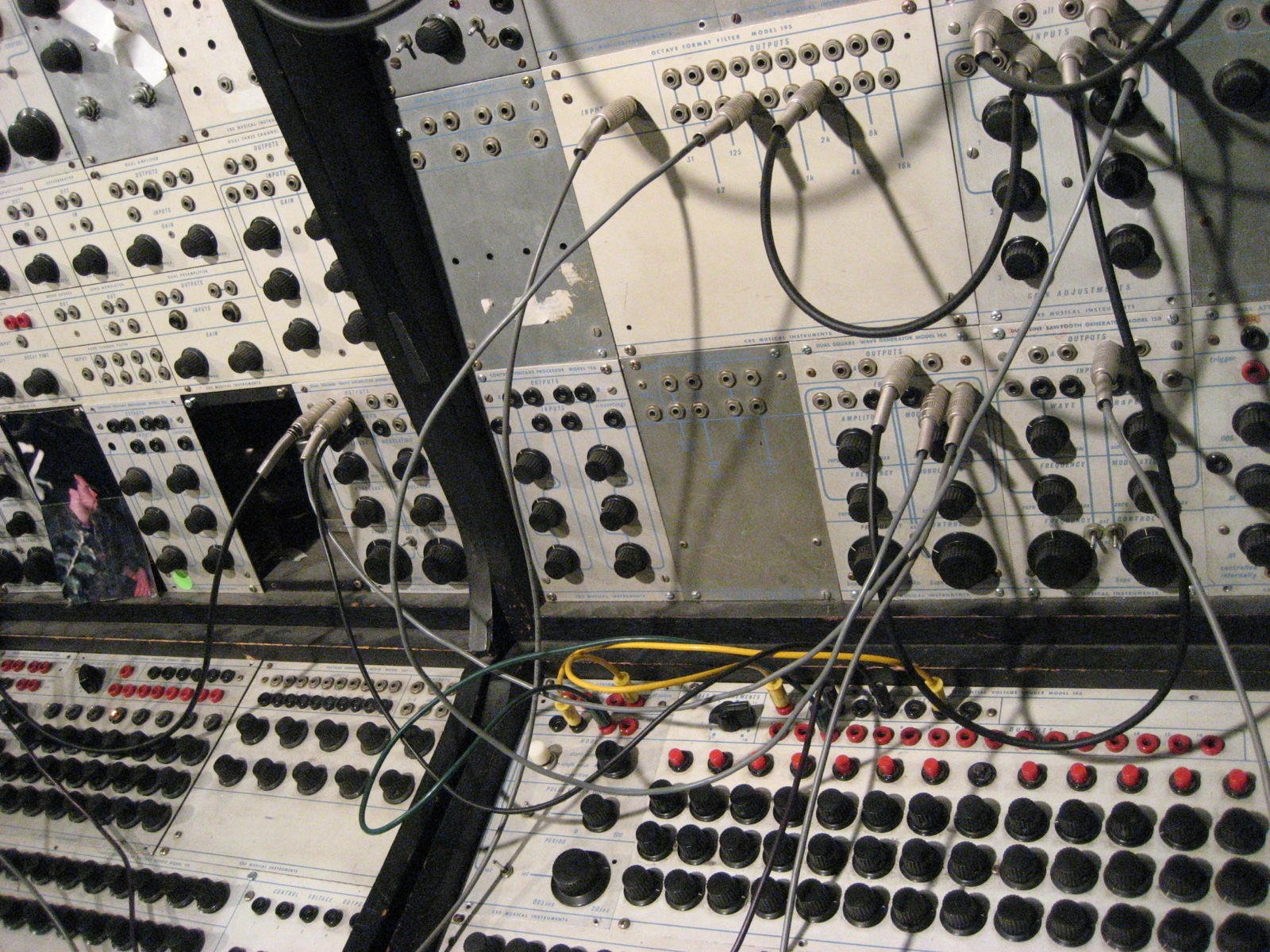
Earliest analog sequencers on Buchla 100 (array of knobs on the bottom)

== See also ==
- Don Buchla
- Modular synthesizer
- Moog synthesizer
- Serge synthesizer
- Robert Moog
- Harald Bode
- Serge Tcherepnin
- Suzanne Ciani
