= Tony Martin (artist) =

American painter and new media artist (1937–2021)

Tony Martin (1937 – March 24, 2021) was an American painter and new media artist known for his groundbreaking light art and viewer interactive sculptures and installations, and the paintings associated with those works. His six decade painting career includes expressionistic figural work and abstraction developed from his life and environs.

== Early life and education ==
Martin is the son of painter and graphic artist David Stone Martin. Born in Knoxville, Tennessee, in 1937, he attended the University of Michigan and the School of the Art Institute of Chicago and the City College of New York. He died on March 24, 2021.

== Art career ==
Tony Martin began painting in Chicago and San Francisco in the early 1960s. There were shows of his work, during that time, at the Boreas and Batman Galleries. His premise, always using oil paint, was for the viewer to experience "looking in, not at". This is in regard to the composition perceptually, and also in terms of thought and feeling. The paintings have always been a melding of the figural and abstraction.

His works using light began with multi-projector and pure light installations and performances in the mid-1960s, in conjunction with the psychedelic music emerging from the San Francisco Tape Music Center.

Martin's exhibitions include: The Scott Alan Gallery, The New York Studio School, The Brooklyn Museum, The National Academy Museum, Max Protetch Gallery, and The Painting Center (catalogue entry by Dore Ashton).

Martin has made extensive use of light and electronic media as well. Often incorporating light compositions and visual projections into interactive installations and musical performances. On such projects he has worked with Pauline Oliveros, Morton Subotnick, Terry Riley and David Tudor.

Some of Martin's works include: Theater For Walkers, Talkers, Touchers (1962), collaborations with David Tudor for the Merce Cunningham Dance Company, and a piece for the E.A.T. Pepsi Pavilion at Expo 70, in Osaka, Japan.

Martin helped co-found The Painting Center in 1993.

In Light Pendulum ‘09, and other interactive installations, Martin distributed variable thematic content through switching systems and optics activated by the viewers. Principles of resonance and feedback are applied through photo and proximity electronics. These kinds of pieces have roots in the viewer-participation sculptures and installations such as The Well (in the permanent collection of the 'Everson Museum in Syracuse), You Me We, The Door (in the permanent collection of the Butler Institute of American Art, Youngstown, Ohio), and Game Room (first exhibited at the Howard Wise Gallery in the late 1960s). He created the light system for the Experiments in Art and Technology Pavilion at Expo '70, Osaka, Japan.

A NEA grant helped him to develop Vector Image Wall, a constantly evolving electronically produced drawing made of spatial and moving lines of light, shown at PS#1 in New York. A web work, Galaxy was commissioned by Electronic Arts Intermix in 2003.

Artfair Miami-Basel, Mills Music Festival, and The Art Students League have hosted new works, including Sound. Light. Migrations, a collaboration with Pauline Oliveros.

Recent computer/video pieces apply direct hands-on drawing techniques in real time. Examples of these are In the Wake Of Edges, Light Marks Converse, and Ear to the Ground.

== Awards ==
National Endowment for the Arts Individual Artist Fellowship, New York State Creative Arts Public Service Program.
