= Don Buchla =

American sound synthesist (1937–2016)

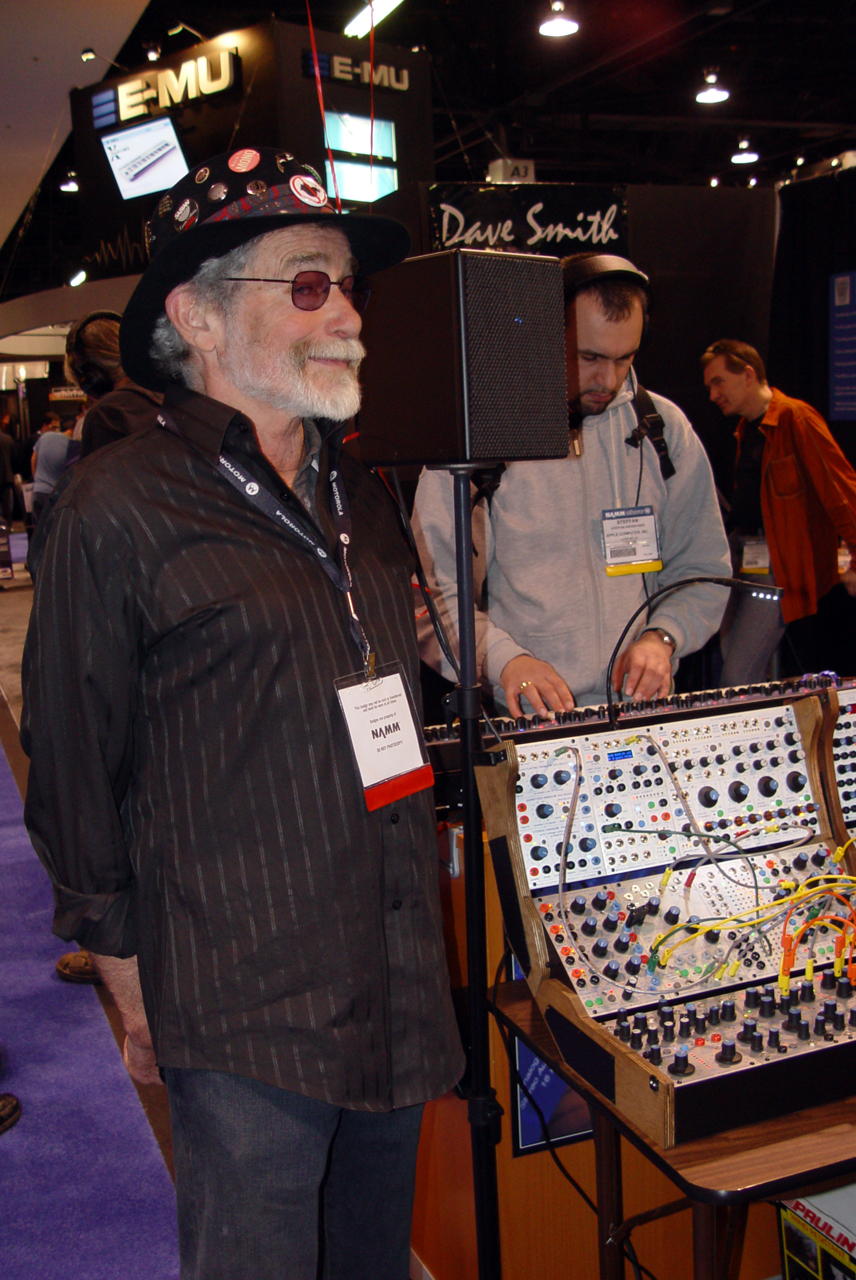
- Don Buchla and Buchla 200e (2006 NAMM Show)

Background information
- Born: Donald Buchla; April 17, 1937; South Gate, California, US
- Died: September 14, 2016 (aged 79) Berkeley, California, US
- Occupation: Electronic musical instrumental inventor

Donald Buchla (April 17, 1937 – September 14, 2016) was an American instrument designer and engineer. He was co-inventor of the voltage controlled modular synthesizer along with Robert Moog, the two working independently in the early 1960s.

== Biography ==
Buchla was born in South Gate, California, on April 17, 1937, and grew up in California and New Jersey. He studied physics, physiology, and music at the University of California, Berkeley, graduating in 1959 as a physics major.

Buchla formed his electronic music equipment company, Buchla and Associates, in 1962 in Berkeley, California. He was commissioned by composers Morton Subotnick and Ramon Sender, both of the San Francisco Tape Music Center, to create an electronic instrument for live performance. Buchla began designing his first modules for the Tape Music Center in 1963.

With partial funding from a $500 Rockefeller Foundation grant made to the Tape Music Center, Buchla assembled his modules into the Buchla Modular Electronic Music System (later known as the Series 100) in 1965, which he began selling commercially in 1966. Buchla's synthesizers experimented in control interfaces, such as touch-sensitive plates. In 1969 the Series 100 was briefly sold to CBS Musical Instruments, who soon after dropped the line, not seeing the synthesizer market as a profitable area.

The year 1970 saw the release of the Buchla 200 series Electric Music Box, which was manufactured until 1985. Buchla created the Buchla Series 500, the first digitally controlled analog synthesizer, in 1971.

Shortly after, the Buchla Series 300 was released, which combined the 200 series with microprocessors. The Music Easel, a portable semi-modular synthesizer, was released in 1972. The Buchla 400, with a video display, was released in 1982. In 1987, Buchla released the fully MIDI-enabled Buchla 700.

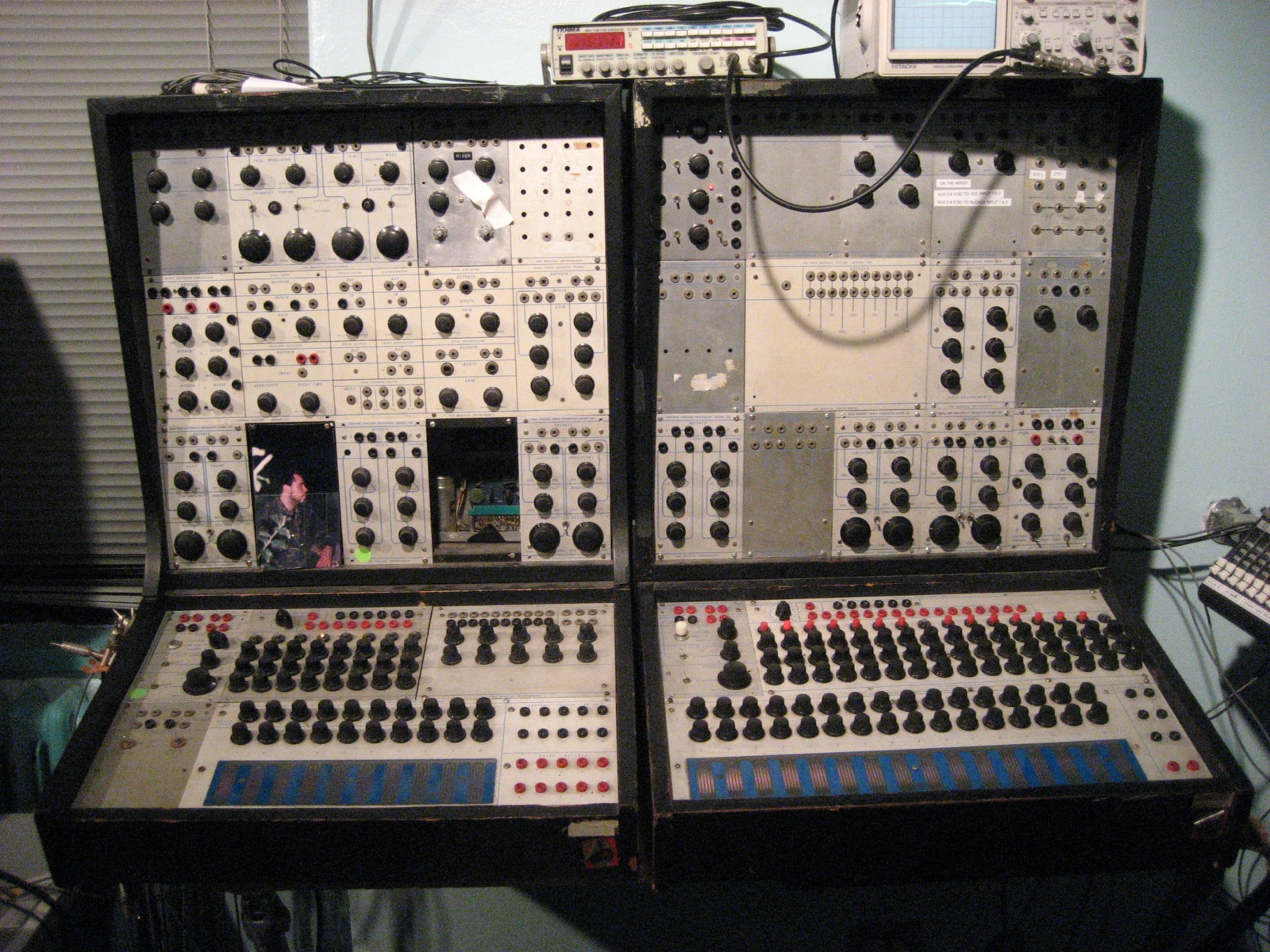
Buchla Series 100 (1963/1966–1969)

Beginning in the 1990s, Buchla began designing alternative MIDI controllers, such as the Thunder, Lightning, and Marimba Lumina. With the resurgence of interest in analog synthesizers in the 1990s and 2000s, Buchla designed and released the 200e hybrid modular system.

In 2005, the New Interfaces for Musical Expression conference in Vancouver featured a keynote lecture by Buchla and a retrospective exhibition of his instruments.

In 2012, Buchla's intellectual property was acquired by an Australian holding company, Audio Supermarket, which started a new brand called Buchla Electronic Musical Instruments (BEMI). Buchla was retained as Chief Technology Officer.

In 2015, Fact reported that Buchla had taken the owners of BEMI to court, citing health problems due in part to unpaid consulting fees and asserting a claim to his original intellectual property. The lawsuit alleged breach of contract and "bad-faith conduct" on the part of BEMI's owners and sought $500,000 in compensation.

Legal documents filed with the state of California indicate that the court ordered the case to be settled by arbitration in July 2015. In August 2016, the court dismissed the case in light of the fact that the parties had reached an out-of-court settlement.

As of 2018, a new company called Buchla U.S.A. has been created to carry on Don's legacy and continue producing his 200e modular synthesizer system, with certain individuals involved in engineering and manufacturing remaining involved.

== Death ==
Buchla died at the age of 79 on September 14, 2016, of complications from cancer in Berkeley, California.

== Personal life ==
He was survived by his wife, a son, Ezra Buchla who is a musician, daughters Jeannine Serbanich and Erin Buchla, and two grandchildren.

== Products ==
Products designed by Don Buchla

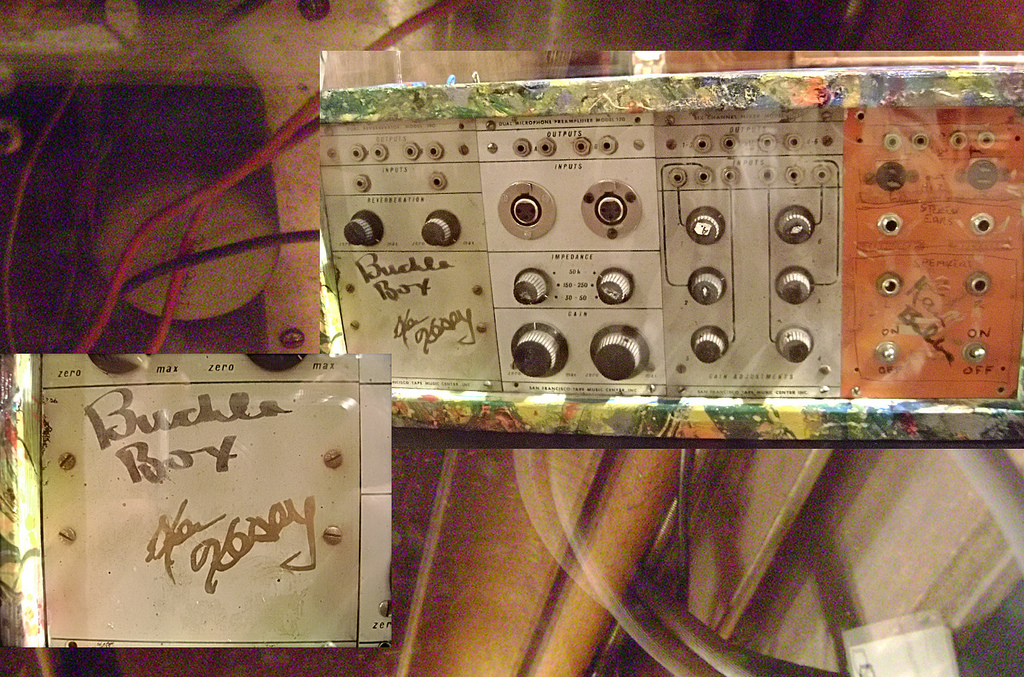
Sound System from the bus "Further", designed for Ken Kesey and the Merry Pranksters

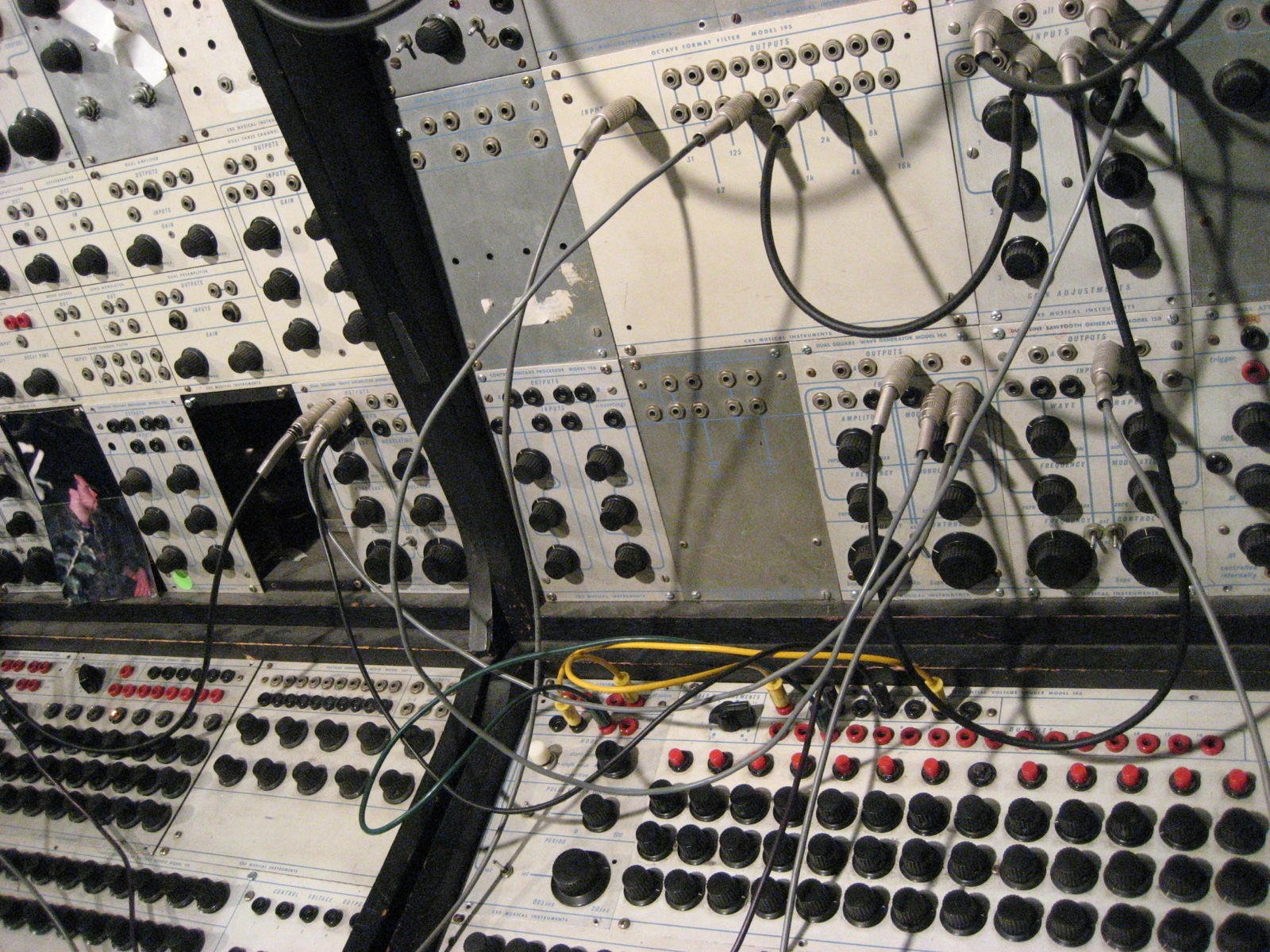
Analog sequencers (bottom) on Buchla 100 (1963/1966)

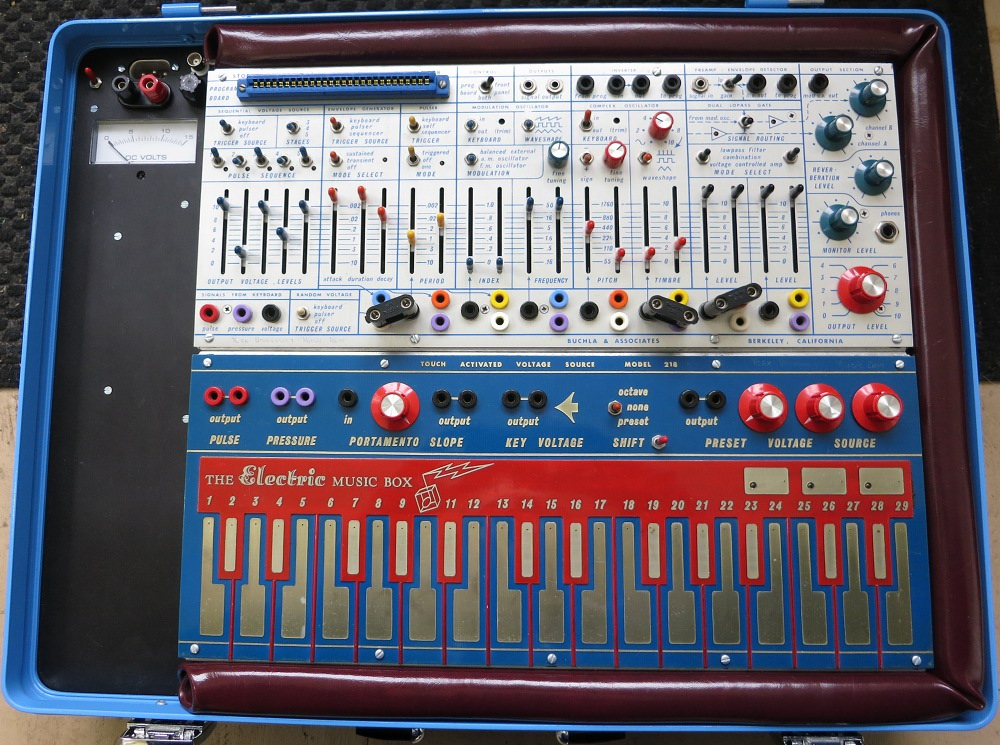
Buchla Music Easel (ca.1973)

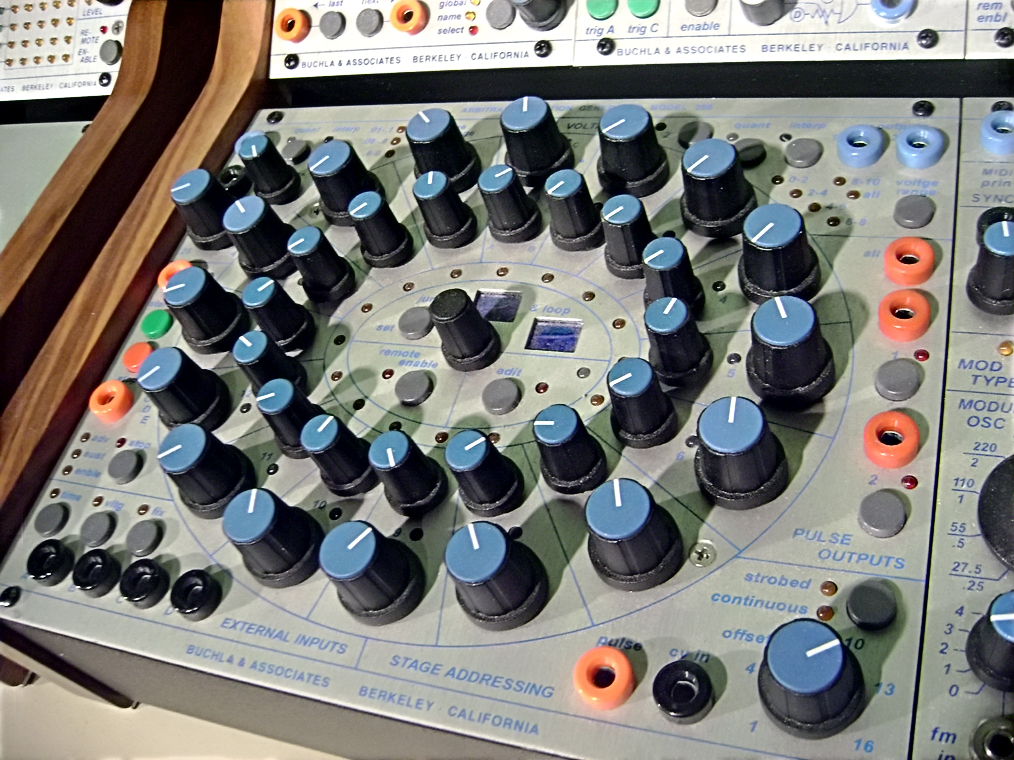
Model 250e Multiple Arbitrary Function Generator module

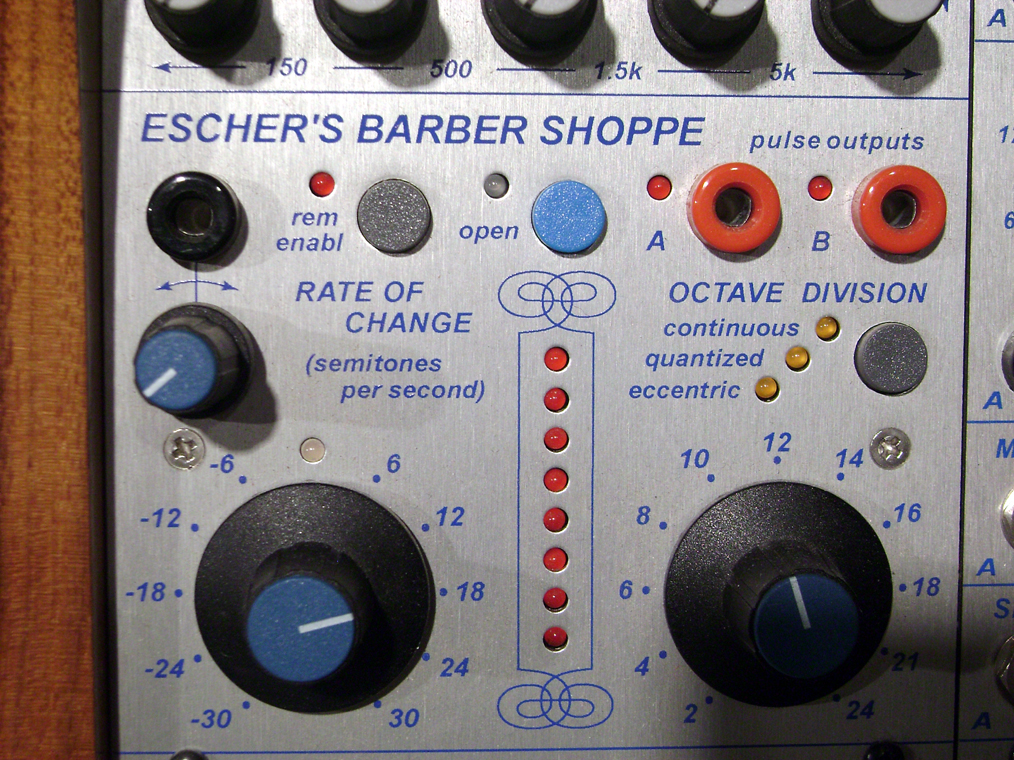
Model 260e Duophonic Pitch Class Generator module

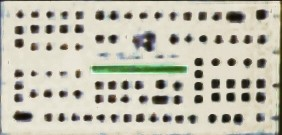
Oberheim OB-Mx (1994) designed by Don Buchla

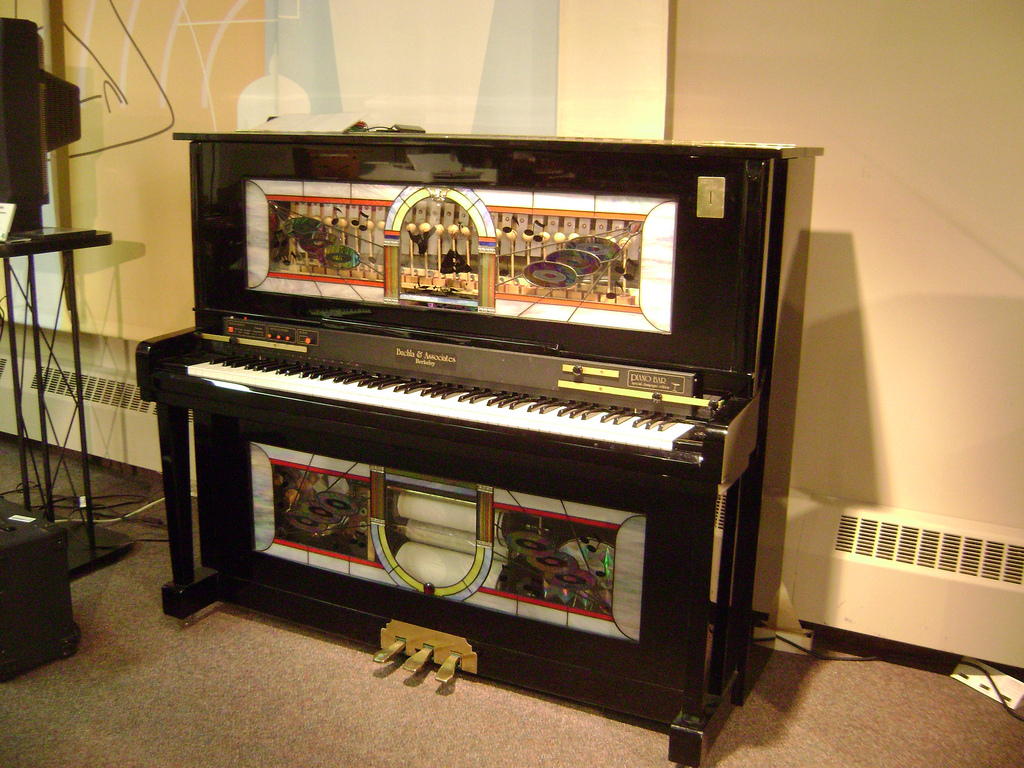
Buchla PianoBar (2001); also sold as Moog PianoBar (2003)

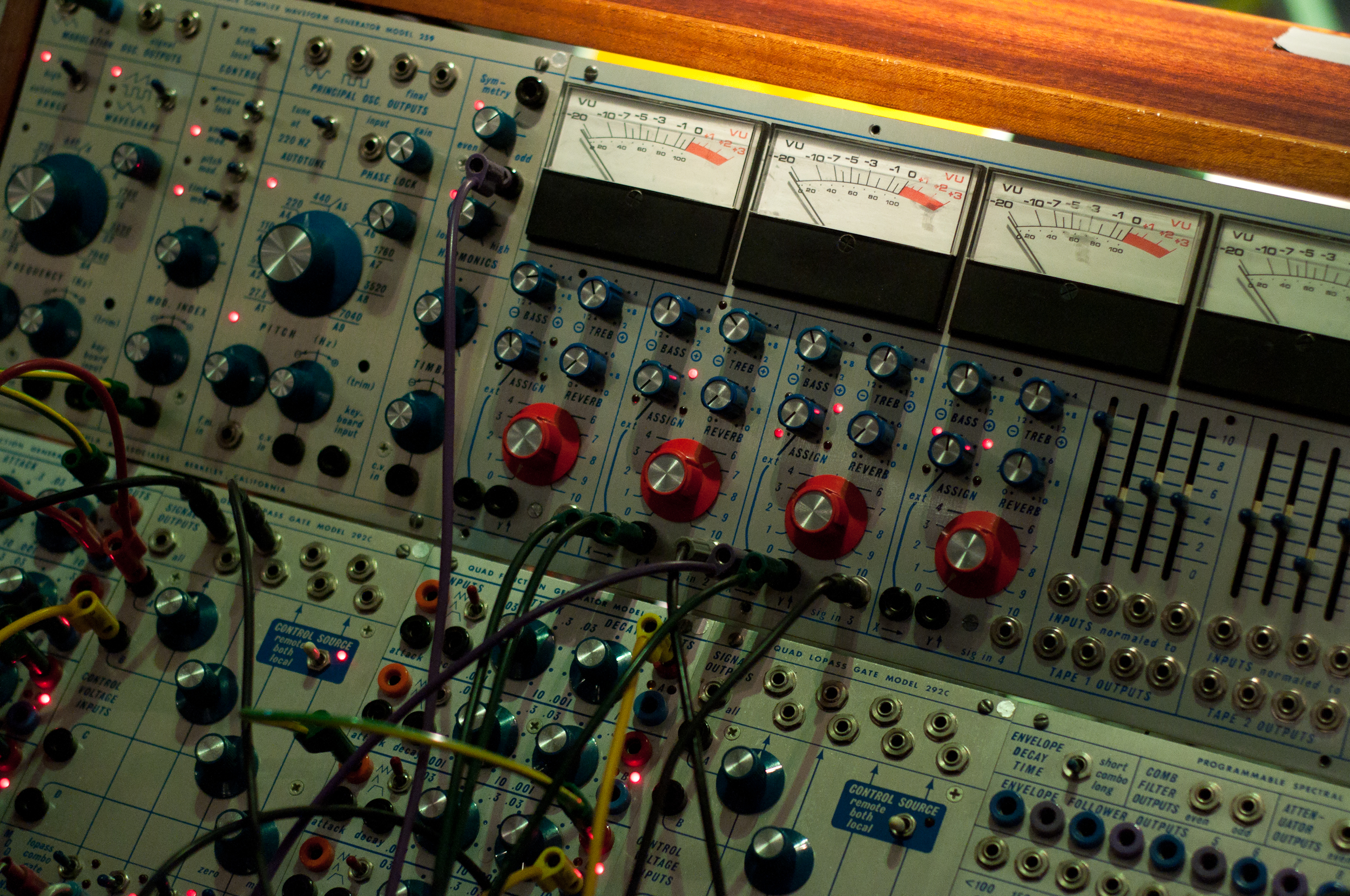
Buchla 200 (1970–1985)

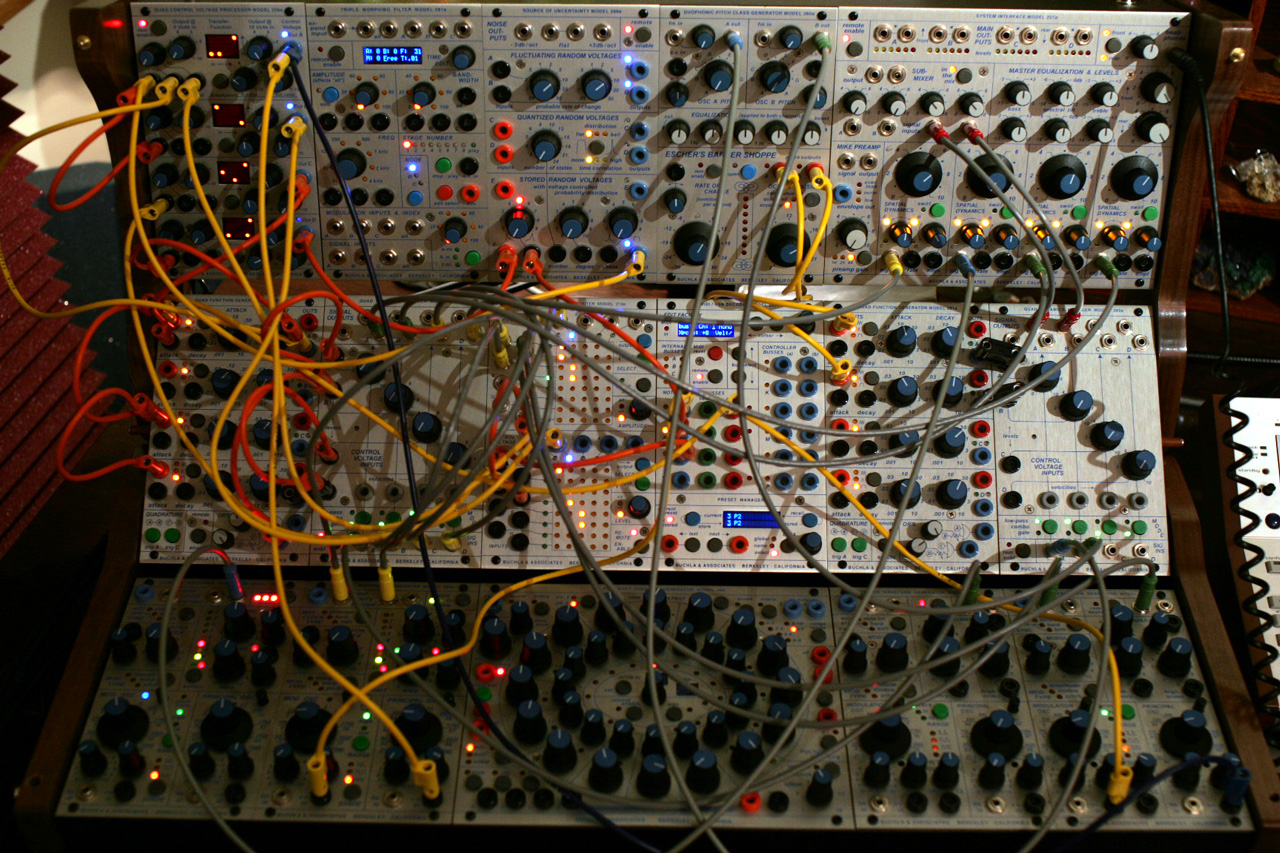
Buchla 200e (2004–)
