= Buchla Thunder =

Buchla Thunder is a type of MIDI controller consisting of tactile control surfaces which are manipulated by touch. Designed by Don Buchla, Thunder has no sound generator of its own and is intended to manipulate sound produced by a synthesizer or other source.

Developed by electronic instrument designer Don Buchla in 1989, Thunder is a musical instrument controller with an array touch sensitive keys. Keys 1 to 9 respond to pressure and keys 10 to 25, with the feather graphic respond to both pressure AND location. Thunder's software — known as “STORM” — allows assignment of any key's touch, pressure and/or location to any MIDI controller number or note number on any MIDI channel. Keys can also be assigned to start and stop “Riffs" that might be programmed as part of the preset. (“Riffs" precede and are similar to “clips” in Ableton Live.)

Early versions had LEDs and photodiodes on a circuit board below a reflective drum membrane. It sensed the velocity of the taps as well as tracked X, Y, and pressure of each finger on the membrane. Later versions used capacitive technology to sense the deformation of the grounded graphic overlay.

There are 8 user presets. Other inputs include a footswitch, a footpedal, and a memory card slot for backup. Thunder has a sophisticated built-in user interface, employing an 80-character displaying menus that get selected from small hexagon touch keys below the display and data entry using the “Thunder” strip below that.

As designed, it could either use the MIDI protocol or Buchla's own more flexible WIMP (Wideband Instrument Musical Protocol). Perhaps because of its uninspiring name, WIMP was never adopted. The CPU is a TMS320.

Ahead of its time, there were fewer than 100 made.

== See also ==
- Lightning, a spatial MIDI controller
- Marimba Lumina, a specialized MIDI control device
