= Buchla Lightning =

The Buchla Lightning is the second in a series of MIDI controllers developed by Don Buchla. It consists of two independent hand-held electronic wands and a box unit that enable a player to initiate sounds and to manipulate those sounds spatially.

== Description ==
The basic concept behind Buchla Lightning (1, 2 and 3) is that you program the unit to assign certain MIDI events/messages to wand gestures. These MIDI messages become sounds as determined by the user. You perform these gestures while holding one wand in each hand. There is a separate box/unit that picks up the gestures you make with the wands and then the sound is produced.

In technical terms. The two wands emit infrared light that is detected by optics. The optics (photo-sensors) "see" the wands to determine two-dimensional location and whether the button on the wand is depressed. By analyzing location information in real-time, the Lightning can determine acceleration and direction changes and turn these gestures into MIDI notes with velocity sensitivity. MIDI control messages can be sent based on X-Y location of the wands and the buttons on the wands also can initiate sounds or turn on controls.

== Development ==
The first Buchla Lightning was developed in 1991, the second 1996, and the third in 2008. With each succession the Buchla Lightning has improved on its ability to control these MIDI events. The Buchla Lightning is said to lend itself mostly to percussive musical styles. The Buchla Lightning II was a vast improvement on the first in technical terms (how the wands were made) and diversity (how they can be used).

=== Lightning upgrades since Lightning I ===
The original Lightning housed the electronics and optics in the same box, requiring that the box be mounted on a stand while the Lightning II remotes the optics, and houses the electronics in a separate half rack cabinet. Lightning II exhibits substantially increased operating range, through improvements in electronics, optics, and wand design. Lightning II wands utilize replaceable batteries. The number of internal RAM-based presets has been increased from 12 to 30 in the Lightning II and the number of fixed presets (playable virtual instruments) increased from 3 to 30. Lightning II accommodates a memory card, which can store an additional 30 presets per card. Lightning II contains a synthesizer, facilitating demos and augmenting the performance possibilities. Lightning III introduced a Z-axis, but that axis is much less precise than the X-Y location. All three versions use the same gesture recognition, a similar programming interface, and wands that work equally well on any version.

== Featured Examples ==
=== Don Buchla ===
- En Plein Vol (1991)
- Trajectories (1992)

=== George E. Lewis ===
- "Virtual Discourse" (1993)
- " Crazy Quilt" (2002)

=== Andrew Schloss ===
- "Virtual Iyesa" (1997)

=== Lê Quan Ninh ===
- "Oscille" (1997)

== Of Related Interest ==
- Thunder, a tactile MIDI controller
- Marimba Lumina, a specialized MIDI control device
- The Theremin, original analog electronic musical instrument to incorporate spatial manipulation as a function of control.
