= Alicia Bay Laurel =

American artist, author, and musician

Alicia Bay Laurel (born Alice Carla Kaufman, May 14, 1949) is an American artist, author, and musician. Laurel is best known for her 1970 book Living On The Earth, a notable guide for participants in the American back-to-the-land movement of the 1960s and 1970s.

Laurel was born in Hollywood, California. She grew up exposed to the arts, intellectual ideas and political activism. Her mother, Verna Lebow, was a sculptor and her father, Paul Kaufman, was a doctor. She briefly attended the Otis Art Institute, San Francisco State University, and San Francisco Fashion Institute before seeking her own course driven by these influences. She studied music as well, and learned open-tuned guitar improvisation from John Fahey, who at the time was married to her cousin Janet Lebow.

Laurel lived on Wheeler Ranch near Occidental, California, in Sonoma County in the early 1970s, where she wrote her book, Living on the Earth. Designed to be a guide for others at the commune, the book was first published by The Bookworks in Berkeley, California, in 1970 and sold out the first printing. It was picked up by Random House in 1971 and sold more than 350,000 copies. It appeared on the New York Times Best Seller list. Laurel's distinctive drawing style is featured also in Home Comfort: Life on Total Loss Farm, and in this book, income from Living on the Earth is cited as one source of support for that southern Vermont commune.

Moving to Maui in 1974, she had many professions, including underwater photographer, elementary school teacher, musician and businesswoman. She updated Living on the Earth in 2000, and traveled the US, presenting 75 performances of her one-woman autobiographical comedy and original music show, "Living on the Earth: The Musical."

Since 2000, Alicia Bay Laurel has released eight music albums as a guitarist/singer/songwriter/record producer, and made 11 Japan concert tours, as well as concerts in the US and in Spain. She produces commissioned drawings and licenses her existing drawings for reproduction on fashion clothing and other merchandise, and shows her drawings and paintings in gallery exhibitions.
