= Wheeler Ranch =

Wheeler Ranch may refer to:

- A ranch owned by Charles Stetson Wheeler
- An alternate name for Rancho Potrero de la Cienaga when it was owned by the Wheeler family
