= Marimba Lumina =

MIDI controller

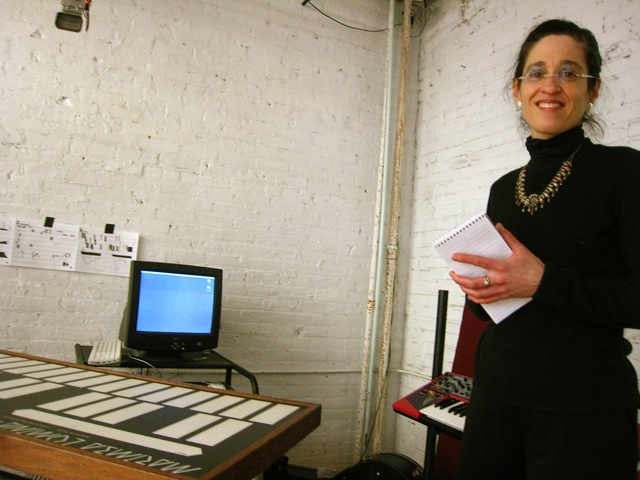
Buchla Marimba Lumina (lower left) used by the group LEMUR

The Marimba Lumina is a MIDI controller developed by American engineer Don Buchla that lets a musician play music via a control surface based on the layout of a marimba.

== History ==
Joel Davel and Mark Goldstein were the co-developers of the design and implementation of the hardware and software. The instrument uses RF technology to recognize mallet location for the recognition of location along the key/bar and recognition of each of four mallets as a potentially unique input.

The curved 4 1/3-octave Marimba Lumina "Gold" was first introduced in 1999 and played by Joel Davel, a collaborator of Buchla, at the Bell-Atlantic Jazz Festival in New York City. Later versions introduced in 2000 and 2001 were produced in collaboration with Nearfield Multimedia and include a 3.5 and 2.5 octave range.

Performers known for playing the Marimba Lumina include Lukas Ligeti, Joel Davel of the Paul Dresher Ensemble, Vessela Stoyanova of Bury Me Standing and Goli, and Max Lord. Toby Dammit with The Residents and Tortoise have also used it on tour. Since 2013, Jon Fishman and sometimes Trey Anastasio have both played a Marimba Lumina during live Phish concerts. The drummer Danny Carey of the band Tool uses a Marimba Lumina on stage when playing the song "Invincible."

Technical support and upgrades are provided by Absolute Deviation.

== Description ==
Control Surface: Velocity-, position-, and contact-sensitive bars are laid out in an array similar to a conventional marimba. Additional controller strips and pads provide other functions.

Controller: Specialized color-coded mallets must be used as the surface will not recognize conventional ones.

== See also ==
- Thunder, a tactile MIDI controller
- Lightning, a spatial MIDI controller
