= Morton Subotnick =

American electroacoustic composer and musician

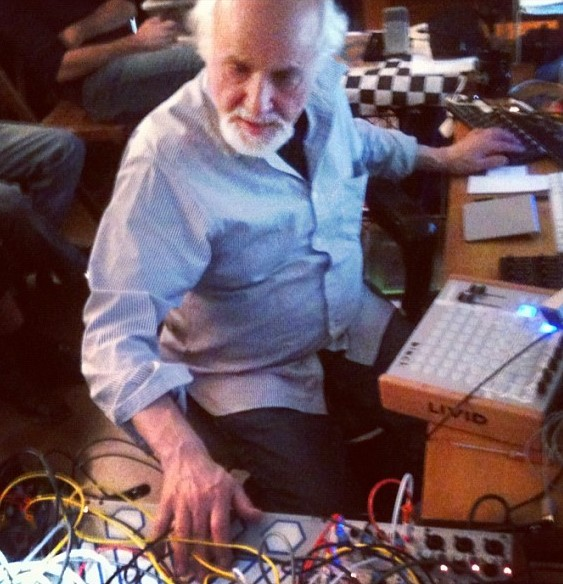
- Morton Subotnick playing a Buchla synthesizer at his studio, NYU (2012)

Background information
- Born: April 14, 1933 (age 93); Los Angeles, California, U.S.
- Genres: Electronic; classical
- Occupations: Musician; composer
- Instruments: Keyboards; synthesizer
- Years active: 1959–present
- Website: mortonsubotnick.com

Morton Subotnick (born April 14, 1933) is an American composer of electronic music, best known for his 1967 composition Silver Apples of the Moon, the first electronic work commissioned by a record company, Nonesuch. He was one of the founding members of California Institute of the Arts, where he taught for many years.

Subotnick has worked extensively with interactive electronics and multi-media, co-founding the San Francisco Tape Music Center with Pauline Oliveros and Ramon Sender, often collaborating with his wife Joan La Barbara. Subotnick is one of the pioneers in the development of electronic music and multi-media performance and an innovator in works involving instruments and other media, including interactive computer music systems. Most of his music calls for a computer part, or live electronic processing; his oeuvre utilizes many of the important technological breakthroughs in the history of the genre.

== Early career ==
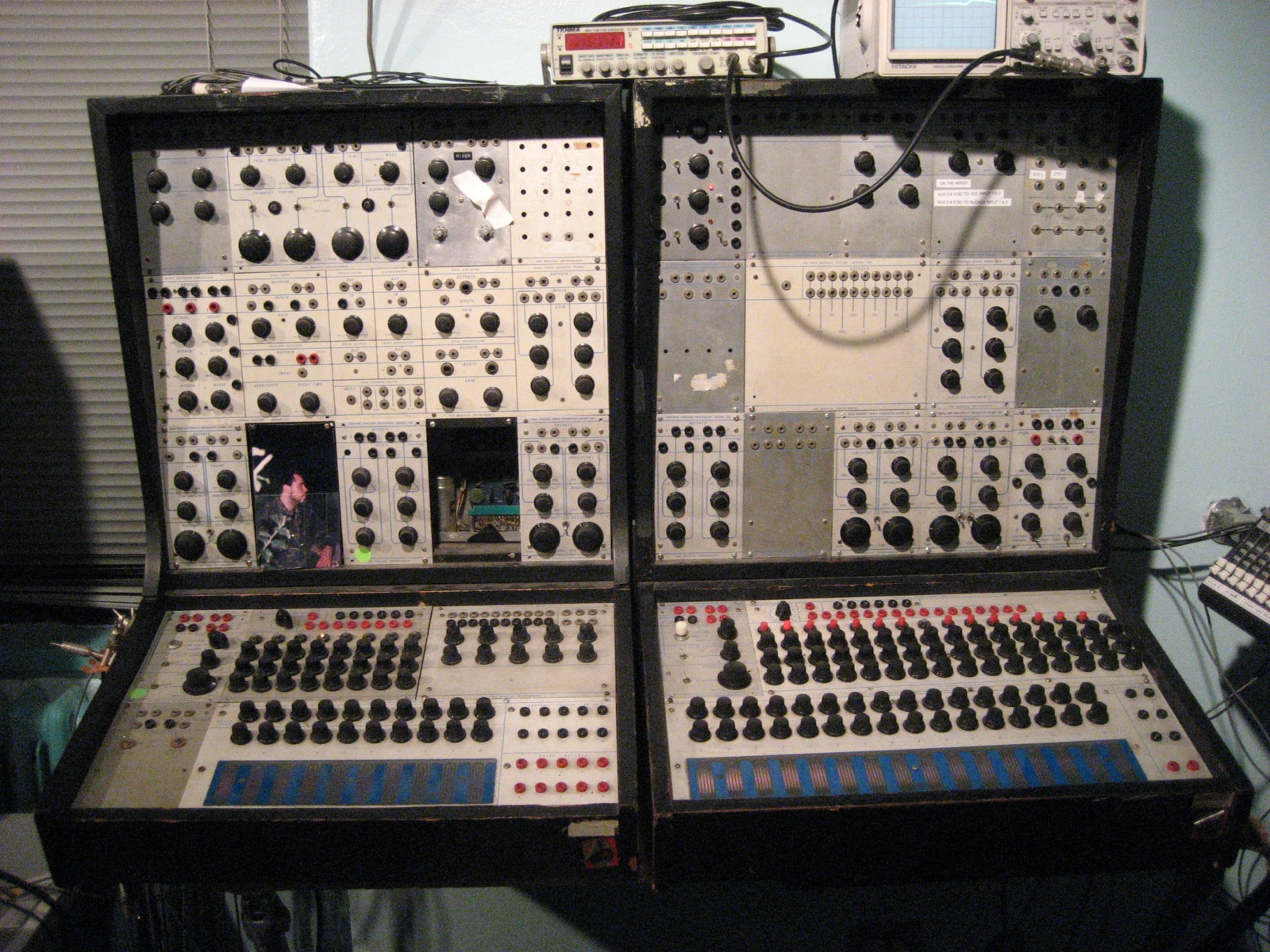
Buchla 100 modular synthesizer at NYU

Subotnick was born in Los Angeles, California, and graduated from the University of Denver. In the early 1960s, Subotnick taught at Mills College and with Ramon Sender, he co-founded the San Francisco Tape Music Center. During this period he also collaborated with Anna Halprin on two works (the 3 legged stool and Parades and Changes) and acted as music director of the Actors Workshop.

In 1966 Subotnick was instrumental in getting a Rockefeller Grant to join the Tape Center with the Mills Chamber Players (a chamber group at Mills College with performers Nate Rubin (violin); Bonnie Hampton (cello); Naomi Sparrow (piano) and Subotnick on clarinet). The grant required that the Tape Center relocate to a host institution that became Mills College. Subotnick, however, did not stay with the move, but went to New York with the Actor's Workshop to become the first music director of the Lincoln Center Rep Company in the Vivian Beaumont Theater at Lincoln Center. Along with Len Lye, he became an artist in residence at the newly formed Tisch School of the Arts at NYU. The School of the Arts provided him with a studio and a Buchla Synthesizer (now at the Library of Congress). He then helped to develop the Electric Circus and the Electric Ear, and became their artistic director. At the same time he created Silver Apples of the Moon, The Wild Bull, and Touch.

== Silver Apples of the Moon ==
Early electronic music was made using wave generators and tape-manipulated sounds. Subotnick was among the first composers to work with electronic instrument designer Don Buchla. Buchla's modular voltage-controlled synthesizer, which he called the Electric Music Box and which was constructed partly based on suggestions by Subotnick and Sender, was both more flexible and easier to use, and its sequencing ability was integral to Subotnick's music.

In the late 1960s, a time when much United States' academic "avant-gardist" electronic music was highly abstract, (largely concerned with pitch and timbre, where (metric) rhythm might be an afterthought or of no consequence, and simple patterned structures were largely avoided), Subotnick broke with this direction by including sections with metric rhythms – those based on pulses and beats. Both Silver Apples of the Moon and 1968's The Wild Bull (another Nonesuch-commissioned work for tape; they have since been combined on a Wergo CD) have been choreographed by dance companies around the world.

In 1969 Subotnick was invited to be part of a team of artists to move to Los Angeles to plan a new school. Mel Powell as Dean, Subotnick as Associate Dean, and a team of four other pairs of artists carved out a new path of music education and created the now famous California Institute of the Arts. Subotnick remained Associate Dean of the music school for 4 years and then, resigning from that position, became the head of the composition program where, a few years later, he created a new media program that introduced interactive technology and multimedia into the curriculum. In 1978 Subotnick, with Roger Reynolds and Bernard Rands, produced 5 annual internationally acclaimed new music festivals.

== Approach to music ==
Where previous electronic music had used non-traditional structures, Subotnick's electronic compositions are structured more like the classical music for acoustic instruments with which audiences are familiar, but with nontraditional timbres and pitch manipulations no orchestra could produce. He has also written for acoustic instruments, and he has studied with Darius Milhaud and Leon Kirchner at Mills College in Oakland, California.

In addition to music in the electronic medium, Subotnick has written for symphony orchestra, chamber ensembles, theater and multimedia productions. His "staged tone poem” The Double Life of Amphibians, a collaboration with director Lee Breuer and visual artist Irving Petlin, utilizing live interaction between singers, instrumentalists and computer, was premiered at the 1984 Olympics Arts Festival in Los Angeles.

The concert version of Jacob’s Room, a monodrama commissioned by Betty Freeman for the Kronos Quartet and singer Joan La Barbara, received its premiere in San Francisco in 1985. Jacob's Room, Subotnick's multimedia opera chamber opera (directed by Herbert Blau with video imagery by Steina and Woody Vasulka, featuring Joan La Barbara), received its premiere in Philadelphia in April 1993 under the auspices of The American Music Theater Festival. The Key To Songs, for chamber orchestra and computer, was premiered at the 1985 Aspen Music Festival. Return, commissioned to celebrate the return of Halley's Comet, premiered with an accompanying sky show in the planetarium of Griffith Observatory in Los Angeles in 1986. Subotnick's recent works—among them Jacob's Room, The Key to Songs, Hunger, In Two Worlds, And the Butterflies Begin to Sing and A Desert Flowers—utilize computerized sound generation, specially designed software Interactor and "intelligent" computer controls which allow the performers to interact with the computer technology.

All My Hummingbirds Have Alibis (1994) was an interactive concert work and a CD-ROM (perhaps the first of its kind), Making Music (1995), Making More Music (1998) were his first works for children, and an interactive 'Media Poem', Intimate Immensity, premiered at the Lincoln Center Festival in NY (1997). The European premiere (1998) was in Karlsruhe, Germany. A string quartet with CDROM, Echoes from the Silent Call of Girona (1998), was premiered in Los Angeles by Southwest Chamber Music.

Subotnick was commissioned to complete a larger version of the opera, Jacobs Room. This premiered in 2010 at the Bregenz Festival in Austria.

Subotnick is developing tools for young children to create music. He has authored a series of six CDROMs for children, mounted a children's website and he is developing a related school program. Subotnick's Pitch Painter for iPad and iPhone (not available on App Store) is a musical finger painting app which presents a new intuitive way for kids to create music.

Subotnick is working with the Library of Congress as they are preparing an archival presentation of his electronic works. He tours extensively throughout the U.S. and Europe as a lecturer and composer/performer. Morton Subotnick is published by Schott Music. Students of his include Ingram Marshall, Mark Coniglio, Carl Stone, Rhys Chatham, Charlemagne Palestine, Ann Millikan, Nicholas Frances Chase, Brian Evans, Julia Stilman-Lasansky, John King, Lois V Vierk, Betty Ann Wong, and Jeremy Zuckerman.

== Personal life ==
Subotnick is married to Joan La Barbara, a singer and composer. Subotnick's older son, Steven Subotnick, is an animator; his younger son, Jacob Subotnick, is a sound designer and his daughter, Tamara Winer, is a psychiatric social worker.

== Awards ==
- Guggenheim Fellowship
- Rockefeller Grants (3)
- Meet the Composer (2)
- American Academy of Arts and Letters Composer Award
- Brandies Award
- Deutscher Akademischer Austauschdienst Künstlerprogramm (DAAD), Composer in Residence in Berlin
- Lifetime Achievement Award (SEAMUS at Dartmouth)
- ASCAP: John Cage Award
- ACO: Lifetime Achievement
- Honorary Doctorate from the California Institute of the Arts

== Selected works ==
- Sonata for viola and piano (1959–60)
- Silver Apples of the Moon (National Recording Registry inductee) (1967)
- The Wild Bull (1968)
- Touch (1969)
- Sidewinder (1971)
- Four Butterflies (1973)
- Until Spring (1975)
- A Sky of Cloudless Sulfur (1978)
- Axolotl (1981)
- A Fluttering of Wings (1981)
- An Arsenal of Defense for solo viola and "electronic ghost score" (1982)
- Trembling (1983)
- The Key to Songs (1985)
- Jacob's Room (1986)
- and the butterflies begin to sing (1988)
- All My Hummingbirds Have Alibis (1991)
- Echoes from the Silent Call of Girona (1998)
- Gestures (1999–2001)
- Then Now and Forever (2008)
- The Other Piano (2007)
- Jacob's Room Opera (2010)
- From Silver Apples of the Moon to a Sky of Cloudless Sulphur (2009 – 2013)
- Jacob's Room Monodrama (2013)
