= San Francisco Tape Music Center =

Non-profit organization

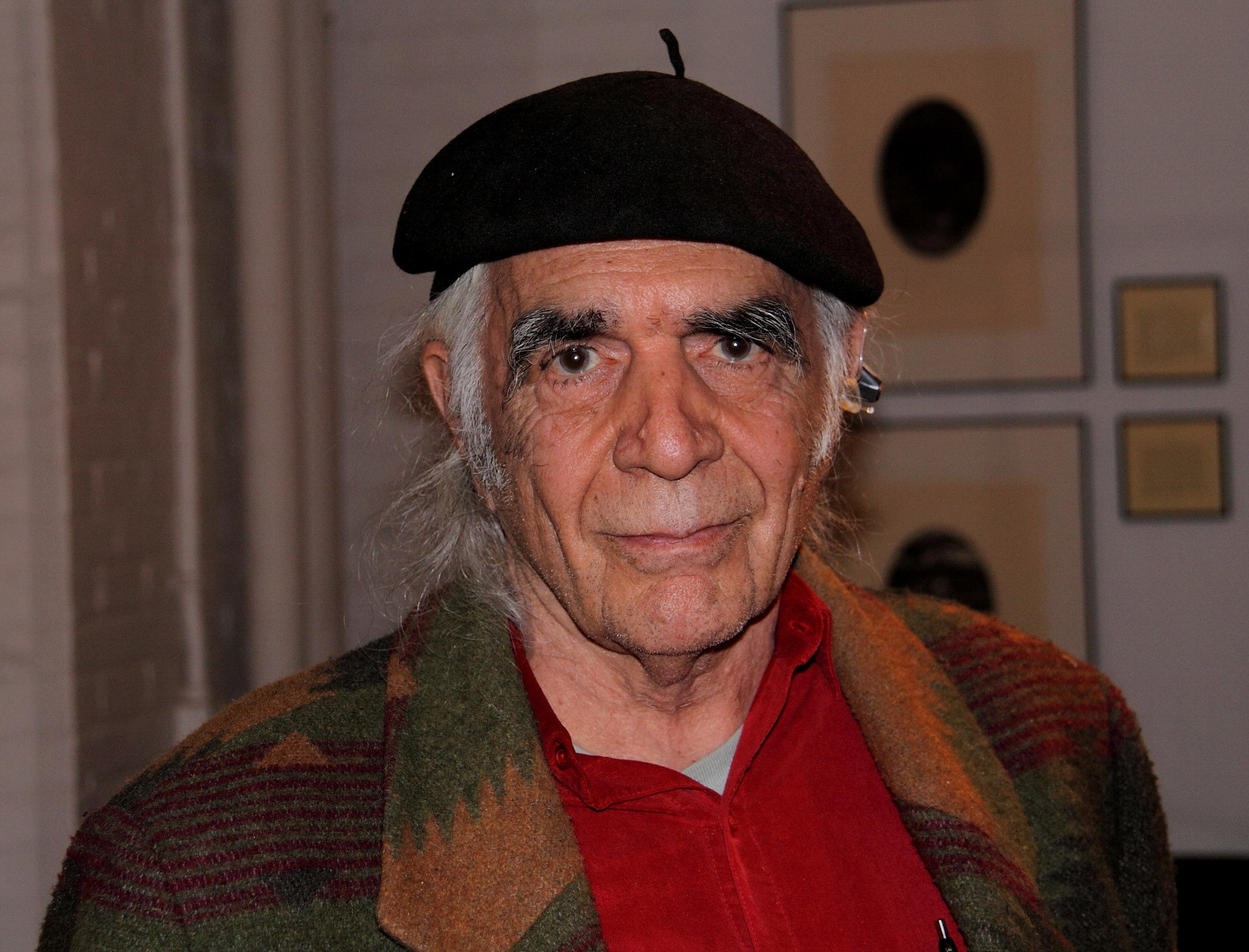
Ramon Sender 2011

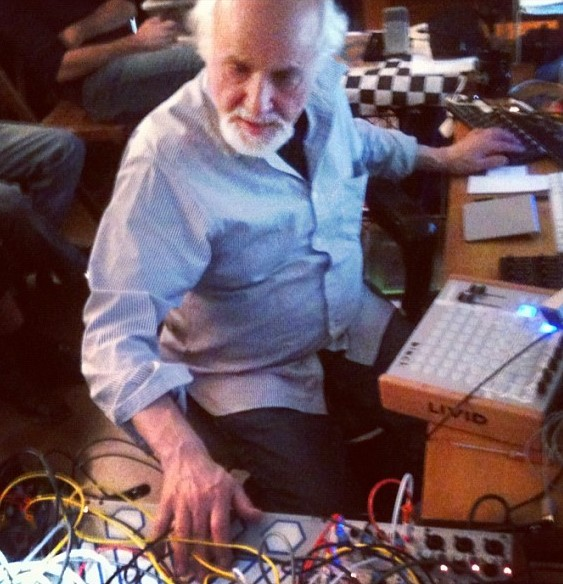
Morton Subotnick 2012

The San Francisco Tape Music Center, or SFTMC, was founded in the summer of 1962 by composers Ramon Sender and Morton Subotnick as a collaborative, "non profit corporation developed and maintained" by local composers working with tape recorders and other novel compositional technologies, which functioned both as an electronic music studio and concert venue. Composer Pauline Oliveros, artist Tony Martin and technician William Maginnis eventually joined the SFTMC.

The SFTMC was an active and important hub for experimental music and interdisciplinary art in the Bay Area from 1962 to 1966.

== History ==
=== San Francisco Conservatory of Music ===
Before the SFTMC was officially established, it began as a small music studio built in the attic of the San Francisco Conservatory of Music by Ramon Sender in October 1961. The studio was minimally equipped and housed little else than the conservatory's two-channel Ampex tape recorder, but Sender and fellow Sonics composers creatively explored the limitations of the studio by using contact microphones to augment their recordings in an experimental manner.

=== The Sonics series ===
The concert series that also paved the way to the creation of the SFTMC, titled Sonics, was organized by Sender and Pauline Oliveros, a fellow composition student of Robert Erickson. The first Sonics concert of December 1961 consisted of original tape compositions by Oliveros, Sender, Terry Riley and Philip Winsor as well as a collaborative live improvisations. The sixth and last concert of the series took place on June 11, 1962.

=== Activities ===
The premiere of Terry Riley's seminal minimalist composition In C was performed at (and organized by) the SFTMC on November 4 and 6, 1964. It was performed by Riley, Steve Reich, Jon Gibson, Pauline Oliveros, Stuart Dempster, Morton Subotnick, Warner Jepson and others, while Tony Martin operated the light show or "visual environment".

The SFTMC members, particularly Morton Subotnick, were instrumental in the creation of the Buchla analog modular synthesizer.

=== Later years ===
Over the course of four years, the SFTMC changed locations twice, first to 1537 Jones Street and then to 321 Divisadero Street, before the Rockefeller Foundation awarded a $200,000 grant to Mills College to bring the SFTMC to Mills and merge it with the Mills Performing Group, where it eventually became the Mills Tape Music Center. Pauline Oliveros, Tony Martin and William Maginnis collectively served as directors for the new center, which is now the Center for Contemporary Music (CCM).
