= Sachiko Hayashi =

Japanese video artist (born 1962)

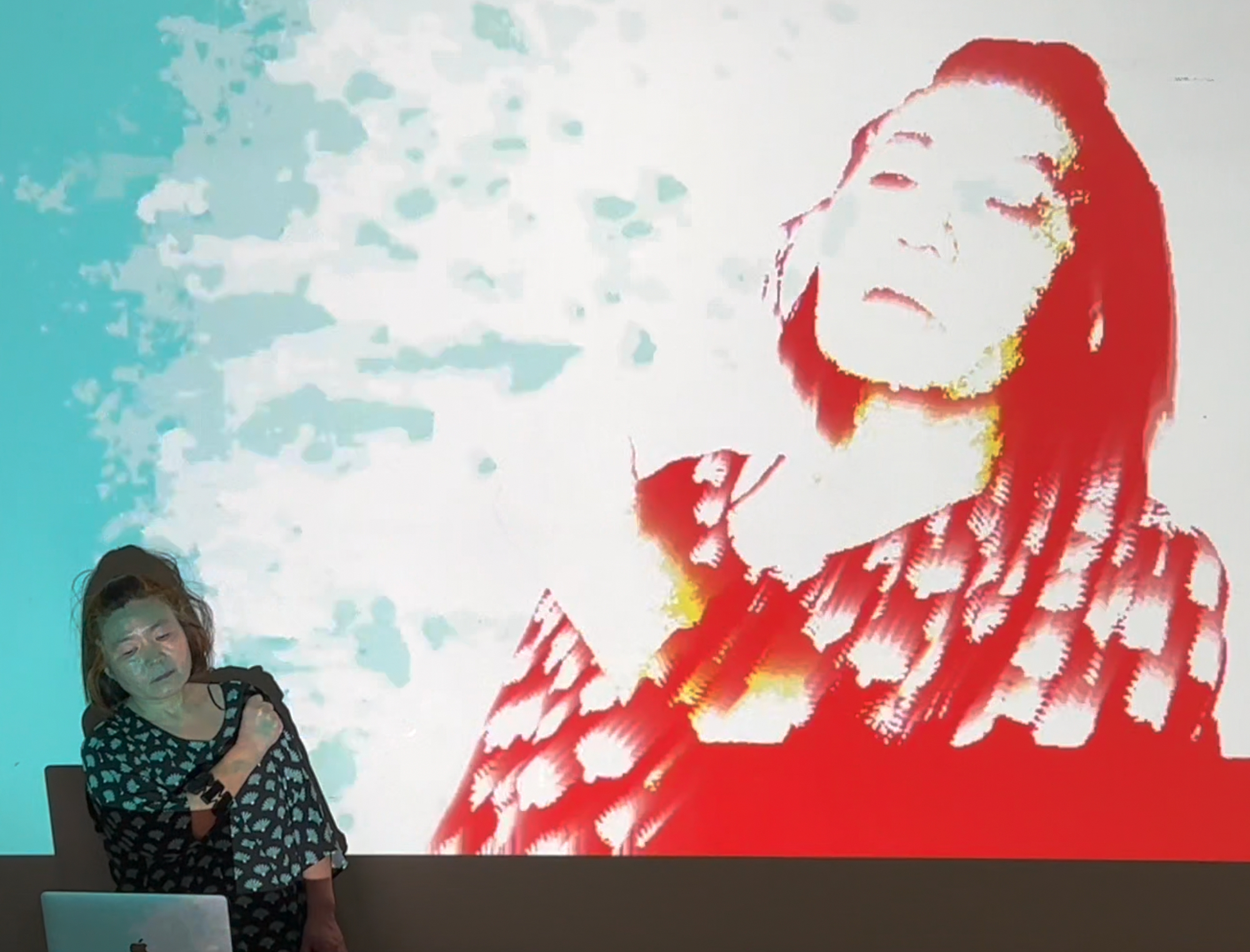
- Hayashi in 2023 during an interactive performance
- Born: 1962 (age 63–64); Tokyo, Japan
- Education: Tsuda University; Coventry School of Art and Design; Royal Institute of Art, Stockholm
- Known for: Interactive media art

Sachiko Hayashi (born 1962) is a Japanese-born, Sweden-based visual artist known for her work in video, net art, and interactive media. Her practice examines gender, identity, and the nature of knowledge by combining conceptual frameworks with experimental use of digital media. Hayashi's work has been exhibited internationally at venues including the National Gallery of Denmark, Transmediale in Berlin, and FILE – Electronic Language International Festival in São Paulo. It has been featured in curated DVD compilations and discussed in academic publications. She has also served as the longtime editor of Hz Journal, an online publication dedicated to new media art, published by the non-profit art and music organization Fylkingen in Stockholm.

== Early life and education ==
Hayashi was born in Tokyo, Japan, in 1962. She holds a BA in International and Cultural Studies from Tsuda University in Tokyo and an MA in Design and Digital Media from the Coventry School of Art and Design, Coventry University, UK. Additionally, she completed two-year postgraduate studies in Computer Arts at the Royal Institute of Art in Stockholm.

== Works ==
In the late 1990s, Hayashi emerged in the field of digital interactivity with CD-ROM and net art projects. One of her net artworks, Last Meal Requested (2003), addresses three incidents of human rights violations, employing sampled documentary sound and visual material to situate them within a historical context. The work was included in Rhizome's educational CD-ROM GROK, produced to introduce high-school age youth to digital art. It has also received academic attention for its exploration of memory and remembrance in the digital age.

Her video work Boop-Oop-A-Doop (2004) investigates the construction of identity in a mass-mediated society through a combination of contemporary digital processing and historical analog video synthesizers, such as the Paik/Abe Wobbulator, accessed at the Experimental Television Center in New York. It was included in Experimental Television Center: 1969–2009, a DVD anthology documenting key video works produced during the center's residency program. The work was also featured in Aspect Magazine Vol. 7: Personas and Personalities, where each featured work is accompanied by its own editorial commentary providing analysis.

Flurry (2006) is a gesture-activated interactive audiovisual installation exploring how human perception, memory, and scientific knowledge together form our notion of snow. Developed at the Interactive Institute in Stockholm, a Swedish state institution dedicated to interdisciplinary research in art, design, and technology, it was first exhibited at the National Museum of Science and Technology of Sweden. The work was later included in LARM – Nordic Sound Art (2007), a festival held at Kulturhuset in Stockholm that highlighted female artists working with sound.

In 2008, Hayashi was commissioned with support from the Danish Arts Council to create N00sphere Playground, an immersive interactive installation designed for avatars in the virtual world Second Life. Integrating sound, image, and motion, it invites participants in the virtual world to co-create a dynamic audiovisual environment through their movements. The work was exhibited at the National Gallery of Denmark as part of the exhibition Virtual Moves. It has since been discussed in academic literature for its role in distributed curation and the institutional challenges of presenting virtual artworks.

== Reception ==
Hayashi's work has been the subject of academic discussion for its engagement with mediated experience, identity construction, and evolving curatorial practices in new media art.

=== Last Meal Requested (net art) ===
Last Meal Requested has been analyzed by art scholar Annie Gérin, who describes it as a sensitive exploration of virtual memorial. Gérin writes, "Last Meal Requested submerges its user in a meditative environment produced by a monotonous 'techno' soundtrack and slowly scrolling lines, within which the artist also documents visually and narrates three instances of tragic human loss...." She suggests that the piece highlights how these events have raised global awareness of human rights and loss, defining public remembrance as a shared human responsibility. The work has also been discussed by James Barrett in his doctoral thesis, where he argues that its spatial and temporal structure is shaped by sound and repetition—through its "looped audio and video, visual images of a repeated moment, and the present tense of spoken language"—which "emphasizes the status of the reader as a witness in both time and space" by placing them in a perpetual present of mediated violence.

=== Boop-Oop-A-Doop (video) ===
In his editorial commentary track on the DVD Aspect Magazine Vol. 7: Personas and Personalities, educator in expanded media Nicholas Economos observes how Boop-Oop-A-Doop intertwines iconic figures through warped imagery and manipulated recordings, and describes it as "a co-mingling of Marilyn Monroe and Betty Boop." He reflects on the shifting presence of these personas, where distinctions between the animated and the cinematic become unstable. "For me," he concludes, "this work resonates most in media's role in creating and continually cultivating a desire to become someone—or something—else: to be ever more desirable, entertaining, powerful, useful—even at the risk of becoming a caricature."

=== N00sphere Playground (virtual art) ===
In the book Cybermuseologi: Kunst, Museer Og Formidling i et Digitalt Perspektiv (Cybermuseology: Art, Museums and Communication in a Digital Perspective), Linnea Jacobsen examines N00sphere Playground in the context of the Virtual Moves exhibition at the National Gallery of Denmark. She notes how the work exemplifies the curatorial challenges of presenting virtual-only artworks in physical exhibition contexts. It is also cited as a key example of distributed curation, in which curatorial responsibilities are shared among curators, artists, technicians, and online communities. The work, she argues, illustrates the complex demands placed on curators to adapt institutional models to new forms of production, presentation, and audience engagement.

== Editor of Hz journal ==
From 2002, Hayashi served as editor of the online journal Hz published by Fylkingen, a Stockholm-based organization for experimental art and music. The journal published content at the intersection of art, sound, and technology, with contributions from artists, theorists, and researchers from various countries. Contributors to Hz include Pauline Oliveros, Roy Ascott, Kim Cascone, and Atau Tanaka.

== Additional activities ==
In the late 2000s, Hayashi was a member of the Avatar Orchestra Metaverse (AOM), a telematic music collective performing in Second Life, where she participated as a virtual musician. For the group's 2008 performance PwRHm, she designed the stage set and HUD receiver. The piece was premiered at the Deep Listening Institute in New York.

In the early 2010s, she curated the Yoshikaze virtual artist residency in collaboration with Humlab, the digital humanities laboratory at Umeå University, Sweden. The residency supported artists working in Second Life and also produced physical exhibitions at the university.

During the 2000s and 2010s, Hayashi was a returning artist-in-residence at USF Verftet in Bergen and the Experimental Television Center in New York. In 2011, she gave an artist talk at BEK (Bergen senter for elektronisk kunst/Bergen Centre for Electronic Arts).

== Publications, interviews and collections ==
=== Publications ===
- GROK, Rhizome, New York
- Experimental Television Center: 1969–2009 DVD Set, Experimental Television Center, New York
- Aspect magazine vol. 7 Personas and Personalities, Aspect Magazine, Boston
- Format: Art Journal, November 2008, no. 55 (includes Hayashi's article "Beyond Technology"), Academy of Fine Arts in Wrocław and the Eugeniusz Geppert Foundation, Wrocław

=== Interviews ===
- JavaMuseum Interview Project (2006), by Wilfried Agricola de Cologne
- Digicult Magazine (2012), interview with Mathias Jansson.
- Pandemic Exchange: How Artists Experience the COVID-19 Crisis (2021), edited by Josephine Bosma.

=== Collections ===
- United States Library of Congress via Exit Art as part of Reactions: A Global Response to the 9/11 Attacks.
