= Johannes Welsch =

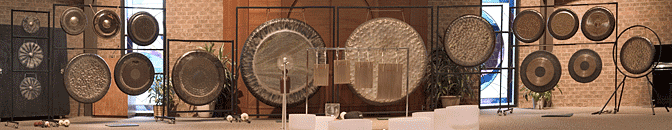
- Performance Installation, Columbia, Maryland, 1994

Background information
- Born: 28 November 1960 (age 65)
- Origin: Saarlouis, Germany
- Genres: Avant-garde, progressive, minimalism
- Occupations: Percussionist, producer/audio engineer, teacher
- Instrument: Percussion
- Years active: 1994–present
- Labels: Sonic Flame, Art Stew Records, Deep Listening, NUUN Records

Johannes Welsch is a German percussionist, recording engineer and producer living in Canada. He is the son of German industrialist Hans Welsch and, on his mother's side, the grandson of European statesman Johannes Hoffmann. He began his career teaching executive programs in Europe before entering the music industry in North America. A percussionist since the 1970s, he has been performing regularly with a large collection of gongs both as a solo performer or in collaboration with other artists since 1994. He is best known for his Deep Listening Label releases "Sound Creation" (2012) and "Dunrobin Sonic Gems" (2014). Welsch is the founder of the Dunrobin Sonic Gym, a center for the exploration, production and experience of sound and music in Ottawa, Ontario, Canada.

== Management & management education: 1990–2000 ==
From 1991 to 1993 Welsch served as the Director of Postgraduate Studies at the Universitätsseminar der Wirtschaft (USW) at Gracht Castle near Cologne, Germany, where he taught executive programs. During the second half of the decade Welsch grew critical of management education and academia in general as evidenced by the publication "Reflections on Professional Cynicism in Education and the Management of Education Organisations". From 1993 to 1997 he served on the Supervisory Board of DSD Dillinger Stahlbau GmbH in Germany. From 1996 to 1999 Welsch was an International Fellow at Johns Hopkins University in Baltimore, Maryland.

== Music producer and recording engineer: 2001–present ==
In 2000, while attending the Omega School of Applied Recording Arts & Sciences, Welsch built a low budget, professional recording studio in Fulton, MD with Scott O'Toole, who served as head engineer. The studio recorded hundreds of local and regional artists between 2001 and 2005, including The Track Record who were signed by Rushmore Records in 2005. In 2002 Welsch was appointed to the Omega School of Applied Recording Arts and Sciences' Curriculum Advisory Board. In 2005 Welsch moved to Canada where he founded the Dunrobin Sonic Gym which he has been managing since. Artists who have recorded and/or performed at the Dunrobin Sonic Gym include Hamid Drake, David Mott, Jesse Stewart, Deep Listening Band, Pauline Oliveros, Glen Velez, Lori Cotler, Malcolm Goldstein and Elaine Keillor. In 2012 Welsch was appointed to the Board of Trustees of Deep Listening Institute.

== Performing & recording artist: 1994–present ==
=== Work with gongs ===
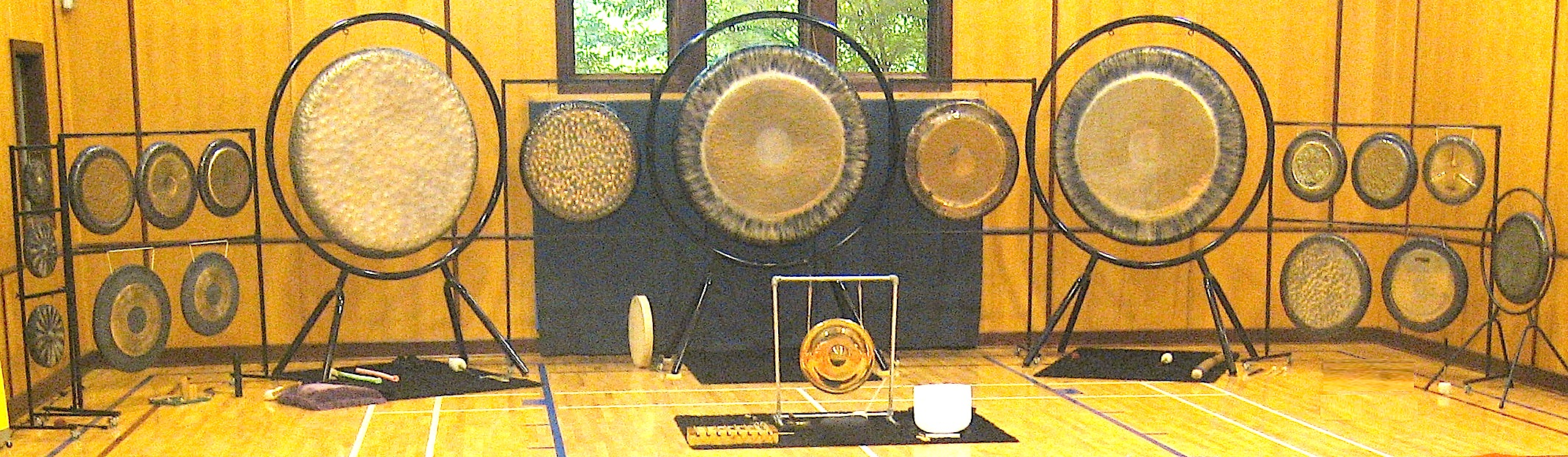
Gong Panorama at the Dunrobin Sonic Gym

Welsch has been recording and performing with a large collection of gongs since 1994. In approaching the gong he pays special attention to the instrument's dynamic range and frequency spectrum. He typically develops soundscapes which come out of and return to silence. While the amplitude increases the gong gradually unfolds its frequency spectrum, beginning with low frequencies (fundamental), and subsequently develops a wide array of overtones (harmonics). He prefers large acoustic spaces for his performances.

=== Sound creation album ===
His album "Sound Creation", an example of his solo performances, features the entire "Sound Creation series of gongs" made by Paiste. Released on the Deep Listening label in 2012 the album received a number of favorable reviews. The album credits include Anton Kwiatkowski (engineering), Elaine Keillor (liner notes), Louis Helbig (photography), and Scott O'Toole (mastering).

== Discographies ==
=== Selected discography as engineer/producer ===
- "Seek and Find" by Nana Frimpong (tlr-02-wo-010, 2002)
- "Communion" by Johannes Welsch (tlr-03-wo-015, 2003)
- "Sudden Cosmic Dissolution" by SCD (Sonic Flame SOFL −10-01, 2010)
- "The Dunrobin Sessions" by Pauline Oliveros & Jesse Stewart (NUUN Records, 2012)
- "Timelines" by Hamid Drake & Jesse Stewart (ARTSTEW Records ASR 001, 2013)
- "Marking The Infinite" by Norm Howard & Johannes Welsch (2013)
- "Anagrams" by David Mott & Jesse Stewart (ARTSTEW Records ASR 002, 2014)
- "Dunrobin Sonic Gems" by Deep Listening Band & Special Guests (Deep Listening DL 47-2014)

=== Selected discography as artist ===
- "Communion" by Johannes Welsch (tlr-03-wo-015, 2003)
- "Stunderthorm" with David Hess and Paul Hinger (Sonic Flame SOFL-07-01, 2007)
- "Sudden Cosmic Dissolution" by SCD (Sonic Flame SOFL −10-01, 2010)
- "Schizophonia" with multi-instrumentalist John O'Connor aka Johnny Black (Sonic Flame SOFL-11-01, 2011)
- "Sound Creation" (Deep Listening DL 44-2012)
- "Marking The Infinite" by Norm Howard & Johannes Welsch (2013)
- "Dunrobin Sonic Gems" by Deep Listening Band & Special Guests (Deep Listening DL 47-2014)
