= Randy Raine-Reusch =

Canadian composer and multi-instrumentalist

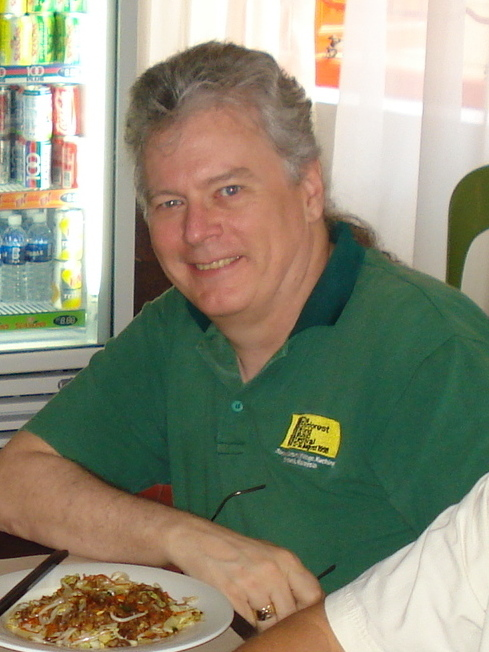
- Raine-Reusch in Borneo, 2009.

Background information
- Born: 1952 (age 73–74); Halifax, Nova Scotia, Canada
- Genres: Free improvisation, world, rock, electronic, musiques actuelles
- Occupations: Sound and visual artist, composer, artistic director, consultant
- Instrument: Numerous world instruments
- Years active: 1970s–present
- Labels: Big Cat Records, Nuscope, Geffen, Beyond, Island, ZaDiscs
- Website: www.asza.com

Randy Raine-Reusch (born 1952) is a Canadian composer, performer, improviser, and multi-instrumentalist specializing in new and experimental music for instruments from around the world, particularly those from East and Southeast Asia. Raine-Reusch was given a Lifetime Achievement Award, in September 2026, by WOMAD South Africa.

== Research ==
Raine-Reusch studied at the Creative Music Studio in the 1977 with artists such as Frederic Rzewski, Jack Dejohnette, and Karl Berger, playing only an Appalachian dulcimer. In 1984, he received funding from the Canada Council for the Arts to undertake study overseas in Indonesia, Burma, and Thailand. He studied khaen in Mahasarakham, Thailand with master musicians Nukan Srichrangthin and Sombat Sinla. After meeting famed Samul Nori drumming Kim Duk Soo in 1986, Raine-Reusch remained in Korea after a concert performance in 1987 to study kayageum with Living National Treasure (South Korea) Park Gwii Hi. He studied didjeridu in Australia while performing at World Expo 88 in Brisbane. 1n 1989, Raine-Reusch returned to Thailand to study khaen, then undertook research on traditional mouth organs in the upriver regions of Sarawak, in southern China, and finally studied the sho in Kyushu, Japan, including lessons with Living National Treasure (Japan) Ono Tada Aki. In 1992, Raine-Reusch studied intensively in Hawaii with Chie Yamada on the Japanese ichigenkin, which he continued in 1996 in Tokyo under the Seikyodo School. Raine-Reusch returned to Borneo on repeated trips throughout 1997 and 1998 to research and record the traditional music of Sarawak, resulting in two CDs on the Pan Records label.

With a collection of approximately 1000 instruments, Raine-Reusch regularly performs on the Chinese guzheng, bawu, hulusi and xun; the Japanese shō and ichigenkin; the Korean kayageum; the Thai khaen and pin pia; the Australian didjeridu; and the Appalachian dulcimer.

== Collaboration ==
Raine-Reusch has recorded with Pauline Oliveros, Deep Listening Band, Aerosmith, The Cranberries, Yes, Raffi, David Amram, Jon Gibson, Jin Hi Kim, and Henry Kaiser as well with as his own intercultural quartet, ASZA. He has performed with a wide range of artists including: Aerosmith, Robert Dick, Mats Gustafsson, Barry Guy, Sainkho Namtchylak, Pauline Oliveros, Trichy Sankaran, Paul Plimley, Miya Masaoka and Issui Minegishi, the Japanese Iemoto, or Hereditary Grand Master, of Seikyodo Ichigenkin. He also performs in a duo with his wife, the Chinese zheng virtuoso and scholar Mei Han.

== Other work ==
Other credits include two Juno Award nominations, a performance on the famed American PBS "Prairie Home Companion", and appearing in five documentary films on music.

He was the co-founder of the Rainforest World Music Festival held in Malaysia. He returned in 1998 as the artistic director and Consultant for both the Rainforest World Music Festival held just outside Kuching, Malaysia, and the Miri International Jazz Festival in Miri, Malaysia, re-branded in 2010 as Borneo Jazz. Both festivals are overseen by the Sarawak Tourist Board. He was a music consultant for the Korean Arts Management Service, the Sarawak Tourist Board, and Cirque du Soleil's Quidam.

He was the former Director of Acquisitions for the Musical Instrument Museum, which opened in early 2010 in Phoenix, Arizona. He also has been an instrument consultant for the Stearn's Collection at the University of Michigan, Ann Arbor and the Museum of Making Music in Carlsbad, California.

Raine-Reusch is an affiliate of the Canadian Music Centre, a member of the Canadian League of Composers, board member of the Museum of World Music, a former board member of the Canadian New Music Network, and the executive director for the Red Chamber Cultural Society.

== Discography ==
Randy Raine-Reusch discography
Year	Title	With
1989	Pump	Aerosmith
1994	Bananaphone	Raffi
1996	To the Faithful Departed	The Cranberries
1997	Gudira	Barry Guy, Robert Dick
1998	Driftworks: In the Shadow of the Phoenix	Pauline Oliveros
1999	The Ladder	Yes
2001	Distant Wind: New Direction For Chinese Zheng	Mei Han
2005	Bamboo, Silk & Stone	Stuart Dempster, Jon Gibson, Jin Hi Kim, William O. Smith (Bill Smith), Barry Truax
2012	Kamüra	Henry Kaiser, Torsten Müller
2013	Looking Back	Deep Listening Band, Joe McPhee
2020	Crossover	David Cross, Peter Banks
2023	Eras	Michael Red

== Books ==
- Play the World - a 101 World Instrument Primer, Mel Bay Productions

=== Interviews ===
- Extensive Randy Raine-Reusch interview at AsiAmerican DreaMusic
- Global Rhythm. World Marketing Incorporated. 2008. p. 16.
