= BL Lacerta =

BL Lacerta is the name of a long-standing music group, the BL Lacerta Improvisation Ensemble. Founded in Texas in 1976, BL Lacerta has performed with musicians and composers such as John Cage (who wrote one of his last compositions for the ensemble and performed with them at the Dallas Museum of Art in 1986), Pauline Oliveros, Stuart Dempster, David Behrman, and a variety of visual artists, actors, and dancers including members of Ensemble Modern, The Erik Hawkins Dance Company, and New Bohemians, to name a few. The group has also created a long series of live scores for classic silent films. The ensemble currently resides and works with student musicians and dancers in the Meadows School of the Arts at Southern Methodist University.
