= Sound Patterns =

Musical piece by Pauline Oliveros

Sound Patterns (1961) is a musical piece for a cappella mixed chorus by Pauline Oliveros. Oliveros won the Gaudeamus International Composers Award in 1962 with this work.

Rather than a traditional text, the work is constructed of phonetic sounds chosen on the basis of their timbre. The piece is entirely notated, lasts about four minutes, and features an exposition (measures 1–12), development (12–46), and recapitulation (47–59).

The sounds may be understood to reflect Oliveros' interest in electronic music, which she had recently begun to work with. Heidi Van Gunden (1983) illustrates this point by highlighting four types of sounds that correspond to basic electronic music techniques:

1. white noise
2. ring-modulated sounds
3. percussive envelopes
4. filtered techniques

White noise is created vocally through the initial consonant "sh" and variations such as s, z, wh, p, t, h, ct, d, ch, th, k, and sw. Ring modulation is imitated through rapidly changing the vowel content, percussive envelopes through "lip pops," "tongue clicks," "snap fingers," and "flutter lips", and filtering through muting such as by covering the mouth with one's hand, sounding the consonant "M" through tightly closed lips, or singing through clenched teeth.

It is Oliveros' "most carefully composed piece" and features only one measure of controlled improvisation linking the development to the recapitulation. The piece also predates similar compositions by György Ligeti and Karlheinz Stockhausen (Momente 1961–1962, revised 1965). Ligeti was actually one of the judges for the Gaudeamus competition and featured unusual vocal sounds in his Aventures (1962) and Nouvelles Aventures (1962–65). These works are all featured in Erhard Karkoschka's Notation in New Music (1966/English 1972).

== Available on ==
- Extended Voices (Odyssey 32 16 0156)
- 20th Century Choral Music (Ars Nova AN-1005)
