= Norman Lowrey =

American composer and music educator

Norman Eugene Lowrey (born 1944, Midland, Michigan) is a composer, mask-maker, performance/sound/video artist, and music educator.

== Early life ==
Lowrey studied composition with Samuel Jones in 1964–65, earned a Bachelor of Music from Texas Christian University in 1967, and completed his formal music education at the Eastman School of Music in Rochester New York. He received an M.M. in music theory in 1970, and a PhD in composition in 1974. Lowrey is also known as an associate of the American composer Pauline Oliveros.

== Career ==
=== Music and sound ===
Lowrey spent many years as a professor of music, specializing in composition and theory. He was a composer in residence and Assistant Professor of Music at California State University at San Diego from 1971 to 1972, Instructor of Humanities at Stephens College (Columbia, Missouri) in 1972 to 1976, and Professor of Music at Drew University (Madison, New Jersey) from 1977 to 2016, where he taught composition and theory, along with analog and digital electronic composition. He also instructed students in environmentally-based composition.

Often specializing in lyric and poetical settings, his orchestral works include a setting of Dylan Thomas' "A Child's Christmas in Wales" for narrator and Orchestral and a setting of "Breaking Open," a poem by Muriel Rukeyser for Women's Chorus and Orchestra. He has also expanded his work into multimedia, including the composition "Orchestrophonia for Mechanical Musical Instruments and Orchestra," a commissioned collaboration with the Colonial Symphony and the Morris Museum's Murtogh D. Guinness Collection of Mechanical Musical Instruments and Automata.

As an outgrowth of his performances with Singing Masks, he collaborated with Cynthia Poten, previously the Delaware Riverkeeper, on a project funded by a grant from the Geraldine R. Dodge Foundation in the spring of 1994 called 'River Sounding.' This included people participating in listening sessions along the 350-mile length of the Delaware River, and culminating in an exhibit with performances at the Independence Seaport Museum in Philadelphia.

He has created collaborative virtual performances online in the Second Life platform with the Avatar Orchestra Metaverse, an international virtual collaborative ensemble, using animated versions of his Singing Masks. A recording of one of his compositions for the group was included in an article published by MIT Press Leonardo Music Journal.

His work with Pauline Oliveros included assisting in the certification training program of her Deep Listening practice, being a member of the Board of Directors of the Pauline Oliveros Foundation, which then became the Deep Listening Institute, and collaborative performances with his masks. He has continued her methodology of Deep Listening for the program now located at the Center for Deep Listening of Rensselaer Polytechnic Institute, and at Deep Listening Retreats in Sweden, California, and New York State.

His most recent work has included performances in the CRAIVE Lab at Rensselaer Polytechnic Institute (Troy, New York) and as a video/sound artist, he received a commission in 2016 to create an installation piece in the Smithsonian's Freer/Sackler Galleries of Asian Art for an exhibit of 2500-year-old Chinese Bells.

=== Sculpture ===
Lowrey has also worked in sculpture. He is the originator of "Singing Masks" and creates musical automata. The masks, fabricated with ceramic, carved wood, and leather represent archetypal animistic characters based on mythical and quasi-mythical entities. Many of the masks and automata use electro-acoustic sound sources, often developed by Lowrey. The masks are featured in site-specific rituals and have been exhibited and performed in Plan B SITE Santa Fe in Santa Fe, New Mexico, Roulette and the Lincoln Center in New York City, The Deep Listening Space in Kingston, New York, The New Jersey State Museum in Trenton, and at a site of pictograph caves outside Billings, Montana.

== Selected works ==
- Dream Shadows Dream presented via Zoom for Ione's 26th Annual Dream Festival, Feb. 21, 2021
- Look & Listen: Chinese Bells, Ancient to Digital, National Museum of Asian Art Webcast, January 28, 2021
- Forest Being, with Avatar Orchestra Metaverse, Presented live at the ECRA Festival in Rio de Janeiro. August 29, 2020
- Excerpts from Dream Shadows Dream, Realized at Carole Ione's 25th Annual Dream Festival Marathon of Dreamers, 0202–2020, Fair John Art Space and Music Salon, Kingston, NY
- Overnight for Dreaming Avatars in Second Life, 2020
- The Thistle for Video and Sound, 2019
- Still Listening, for Automata and Electronics, 2019
- Wood Thrush Sings, for Singing Mask and Electronics, 2018
- Remembering Rose Mountain Dreaming Sounding, HTML App, 2018
- Sounding The Long Dream, for Video and Electronics, 2018
- River of Bells, for Video and Bells, 2017
- Dreaming Pauline Oliveros in Kingston, for Video and Electronics, 2017
- SOUNDINGS: Singing Masks/Automata/Multimedia, 2016
- Dreaming Into 2016, for Virtual Singing Masks and Electronics, 2016
- Being on This Earth: 1. With Trees, for Video and Soundscape, 2015
- In Exhibit, Ariadne's Phylogenetic Shoelace, Berlin, Germany, 2015
- Dream Shadows Dream for Singing Masks, Automata, and Electronics, 2013
- Once More, the Round on a poem by Theodore Roethke, for SATB Chorus, 2012
- Remember, Dream for Singing Masks and Video, 2011
- OneMany (OM) for Singing Masks, Electronics, 2010
- Mysterium Magnum: Singing Mask Dreamsong Meditations, 2009
- Onieroscape for Singing Masks and Electronics, 2009.
- Imp/Rov(ing)isation for Singing Masks and Electronics, 2008
- Orchestrophonia for Mechanical Musical Instruments and Orchestra, 2007
- In Whirled (Trance)Formations for Virtual Singing Masks, 2006
- Into the Deep (Dreaming) for Singing Masks, Surround-Soundscape and Electronics, 2006
- We Are Dreaming This: Transtemporal Dreaming for Singing Masks, Video, Surround-Soundscape and Electronics, 2005
- Private Prayers / Public Rituals: For Peace for Singing Masks, Soundscape and Electronics, 2005
- DreamWeaving for Singing Masks, Soundscape and Electronics, 2001
- Invocation: Morning Walk With Buddha BigEars for Singing Mask, Soundscape and Electronics, 2001
- RiverSoundMind for Singing Masks, Soundscape and Electronics, 2001
- In Parallel: Dreaming Into Alternate Universes for Singing Masks, Surround-SoundScape, Narration and Movement, 2000
- ReVoicings for Singing Masks, Voice and Electronics, 2000
- Spirit Talk: Conversations with the Singing Masks, Bird/River Sounds and Electronics, 1999
- Spirit Dreams: Stories of the Singing Masks for Singing Masks, Narrator, River Sounds and Electronics, 1997
- Into the River of Longest Night for four flutes, four horns, xylophone, narrator and river sounds, text by Theodore Roethke,1995
- riverdream through us A Listening Ceremony in Seven Dreamings for Singing/Listening Masks, Riversounds, & Listener/Celebrants 1995
- from Scripture of the Lotus Blossom of the Fine Dharma for Voices and River Sounds, 1995
- Spirit Dream A Mask Performance/Ceremony, with Pauline Oliveros, 1993
- To Hear a World ... (After thoughts regarding the work of David Bohm),1992
- Out of the Wasteland, Music for the Dance,1991
- Interface, Music for the Dance, 1989
- whisperswithin, Music for the Dance, 1988
- The Water Dances, Music for the Dance, 1987
- Voices of Possibility, Music and Masks for Dance,1987
- Music to Selected Sonnets of William Shakespeare for soprano and orchestra, 1985
- The White Canoe for Masks, Speakers and Gamelan, 1984
- Inventing Voice for Masks and Gamelan, 1983
- Shamanic Voices for ceramic sculpture, music, choreography, video tape and narration. choreography, videotape and narration, 1980–81
- Earth Song for ceramic sculpture, music, narration and video tape, 1978–79
- Trumantra for five trumpets, tape and audience, 1978
- Waves for solo trumpet, narrator and prepared tape, texts by Virginia Woolf, 1977
- Breaking Open, for Women's Chorus and Orchestra, on poems by Muriel Rukeyser, 1976
- A Child's Christmas in Wales Setting for Narrator and Orchestra, text by Dylan Thomas, 1974

== Discography ==
- Spirit Talk: Conversations with the Singing Masks, Deep Listening – DL 12-2000 CD, released 2000
- Revoicings, Deep Listening – DL 14-2000 CD, released 2000
- Spirit Dreams: Stories of the Singing Masks, Deep Listening – DL 11-2000 CD, released 2000
- River Sounding, Deep Listening – DL 13-2000 CD, released 2000
