= Het Apollohuis =

Dutch cultural space, art and music publisher

Coordinates: 51.439574°N 5.494875°E

Het Apollohuis (English: The Apollo House) was a space for experimental music and visual arts, "focused in particular on...sound art, new music, performance art and the new media," founded in Eindhoven, Netherlands, by Remko Scha and Paul Panhuysen in a former 19th century cigar factory in 1980. Partly funded by their own publishing house, the space was closed in 2001 after their grant was discontinued.

"Between 1980 and 2001, Het Apollohuis organized 253 art exhibitions, 476 concerts and performances, 46 public lectures, symposia and several festivals (as "ECHO: images of sound II" in 1987 or FLEA Festival in 1997). Artists-in-residence, asked to create an exhibition, an installation or a publication, were provided with an apartment, studio space, and materials. Known artists that had events at the Apollohuis were for instance Ellen Fullman, Glenn Branca, Michel Waisvisz, Pauline Oliveros, Pierre Bastien, The Hub (band), Nicolas Collins, Maciunas Ensemble, Max Eastley.

The organization gave out a series of books and publications on each anniversary that the building was open. Also, under the editorial name Het Apollohuis Eindhoven, and stamp featuring Art About Apollo, they published different monographs, CDs and catalogues about the shows and exhibitions which were taking place.

Their last closing catalogue included several letters from artists, who at some point collaborated with the institution. Also a full artist reference was printed as back-cover design.

The archive of Het Apollohuis, all together with a handful of audio, text and image documents, is indexed, documented and scientifically preserved in the archives of ZKM since 2009.

== Publications ==
- Het Apollohuis 1995-2001. Het Apollohuis Eindhoven, Netherlands.
- Van Peer, R. 1993. Interviews with Sound Artists taking part in the festival ECHO. The Images of sound II. Het Apollohuis Eindhoven, Netherlands. ISBN 907163818-9.
- Villers, B. 1992. Un Peu, Beaucoup.... Het Apollohuis Eindhoven, Netherlands. ISBN 907163817-0.
- Kuniyasu, T. 1992. Return to Self. Het Apollohuis Eindhoven, Netherlands. ISBN 907163816-2.
- Homburg, T. 1992. Graphics and Topography. Het Apollohuis Eindhoven, Netherlands. ISBN 907163815-4.
- Het Apollohuis 1990-1995. Het Apollohuis Eindhoven, Netherlands.
- Het Apollohuis. 1987. ECHO. The Images of Sound 1. Het Apollohuis Eindhoven, Netherlands.
- Het Apollohuis 1985-1990. Het Apollohuis Eindhoven, Netherlands.
- Johnson, T. 1989. The Voice of New Music: New York city 1972-1982. Het Apollohuis Eindhoven, Netherlands. ISBN 907163809-X.
- Het Apollohuis 1980-1985. Het Apollohuis Eindhoven, Netherlands.
- Visch, H. 1992. I See I Understand I Know I Remember I Do. Het Apollohuis Eindhoven, Netherlands. ISBN 907163814-6.

== Festivals/Events ==
- NowHere (1995)
- ECHO. The Images of Sound II (1987)
- ECHO Festival, The Images of Sound I (1984–85)

== See also ==
- WORM
- W2 Poppodium
