= Konträr =

Independent theatre and performance venue in Stockholm, Sweden

Konträr is a theatre for contemporary and experimental performing arts in Stockholm, Sweden. It was founded in 2022 by artists Freja Hallberg, Jenny Möller Jensen and Linda Forsell and has staged both original productions and guest performances from Sweden and other countries.

== History ==
Konträr is located at Östgötagatan 33 on Södermalm in Stockholm, in the former Scala cinema, built in 1911. From 1971 to 1986, the premises housed Fylkingen, an organisation for experimental music and intermedia art. The space was redesigned by the Swedish architectural firm NAVET and reopened as Konträr in September 2022. The founders were previously active in the performance collective PotatoPotato, founded in Malmö in 2008.

== Artistic profile and programming ==
Konträr’s programming includes text-based theatre, installations, durational works and participatory formats. The venue has hosted Swedish and international artists, among them Rimini Protokoll and the Finnish collective Glitcher.

== Productions ==
Bråk (2022–2025) — A four-hour ensemble piece featuring bluegrass and live music. Premiered at Inkonst, performed for multiple seasons at Konträr, guest-performed at Gothenburg City Theatre and Atelje 212 in Belgrade.

Konträr Christmas Show (2023) – A production staged annually by Konträr.

Point of No Return (2023) — An event that funded the creation of a new independent company, with the winning proposal received 500,000 SEK, a premiere at Konträr, and a 20-performance paid tour.

1974 (2024) — A co-production with PotatoPotato and Nyxxx on Swedish cultural policy. Staged at Konträr, later adapted for Parkteatern as a podcast, and published in the anthology Brännpunkter (Atlas, 2024).

Fools Errand – An Alchemical Sonata (2024) — A performance by Bogdan Szyber based on his rejected doctoral dissertation.

Skådis i Bur (2023) – An endurance performance that feaatured an actor locked in a cage naked for three days.

== Cultural policy and advocacy ==
In December 2024, Konträr co-organised a protest in the Swedish Parliament against proposed national funding cuts, attended by representatives from over 150 independent arts organisations. Earlier in the same year, the venue cancelled its autumn programme following a rejected public funding application.

== Awards ==
In 2023, Konträr was awarded the Michael Nyqvist Foundation Award.

== See also ==
- Fylkingen
