= DLB (disambiguation) =

DLB most often refers to Dementia with Lewy bodies, one of the two Lewy body dementias.

DLB may also refer to:

- Deep Listening Band, an American musical group
- Dictionary of Literary Biography, a specialist encyclopedia dedicated to literature published by Gale
- Dolby Laboratories, a company specializing in audio noise reduction and audio encoding/compression
