= Avatar Orchestra Metaverse =

The Avatar Orchestra Metaverse (AOM) (founded March, 2007) is a large collaborative group of performers spread across three continents, who incorporate the use of online avatars alongside virtual instruments, to create a variety of audio-visual performances within Second Life.

== About ==
The Avatar Orchestra Metaverse consists of members based in Europe, North America and Asia. The core membership ranges between 8 and 12 members who are artists from music, sound art, visual art, new media, architecture and other disciplines. This, however, is not a fixed number, with the orchestra's additional members changing on a semi-regular basis. The group was founded by composers Hars Hefferman and Shintaro Miyazaki aka Maximillian Nakamura, who were active in the group until 2008. Current active members include transdisciplinary artists Björn Eriksson (Sweden), Tina M. Pearson (Canada), Norman Lowrey (USA), Leif Inge (Norway), Frieda Korda (Belgium), Max D. Well (Germany), Viv Corringham (UK/USA), Johannes Riedmann (Germany), Chris Wittkowsky (Germany), Brenda Hutchinson (USA), Gema FB Martín (Spain), and Harald Muenz (Germany). Former members who have created and collaborated on works for the Orchestra include Pauline Oliveros (USA), Stuart Dempster (USA), Jeremy Owen Turner (Canada), Andreas Mueller (Germany), Biagio Franca (Italy), Tim Risher (USA), Sachiko Hayashi (Japan/Sweden), Liz Solo (Canada), and Stelarc (Australia) among others.

This membership makes use of Second Life to perform telematically with each other, using virtual instruments which commonly created specifically for the composition they are used in. One example of these instruments is the 'Onomatophone', six spheres which move around the virtual space emitting separate sounds to the audience, the purpose of which being to change the sounds heard by different audience members depending on their own proximity with the separate spheres.

In certain cases, the membership's avatars themselves are modified and used as the instruments within the performances. To do this, AOM members make use of a HUD, containing various sample sounds, which – when played – also highlight the avatar in some manner, to make the audience aware of which participant is 'playing' at that point.

Due to the virtual nature of the group, they have been able to perform live around the world via streaming to various countries. Countries they've performed in include France, Germany, Norway, Sweden, Italy, Spain, the Netherlands, Canada and the United States. This had also allowed them to perform for various performative festivals, including Sound Symposium XVI and Wien Modern.

== Past Productions ==
- Vicky's Mosquitos, by Harold Schellinx, directed by Miulew Takahe (2007)
- Wee No Kresh, composed by Andreas Müller (2007)
- Rue Blanche, composed by Björn Eriksson (2007)
- Fadheit, composed by Shintaro Miyazaki (2007)
- Fragula, composed by Björn Eriksson (2007)
- SLippery SLope, composed by Jeremy Owen Turner (2007)
- Ursonate, composed by Shintaro Miyazaki (2007)
- Riesenrad, composed by Jeremy Owen Turner (2007)
- The Heart of Tones; mixed reality version, composed by Pauline Oliveros (2007)
- XAANADRuuL; Stockhausen's Pleasuredome 4 Sirius Business, composed by Jeremy Owen Turner (2008)
- PwRHm, composed by Tina Pearson (2008)
- Waste From Real Life, composed by Biagio Francia (2008)
- The New Economy, composed by Biagio Francia (2008)
- In Whirled (Trance) Formations, composed by Norman Lowrey (2008)
- Aleatricity, composed by Andreas Müller (2008)
- Pataphone Aomprovisation, composed by AOM (2008)
- Birth, composed by Liz Solo (2008)
- Pleiades, composed by AOM & Tintinnabulate (2008)
- Talarepsincrobiugh, composed by Erik Rzepka (2008)
- Avatars Brew, composed by Leif Inge (2008)
- Ritual, composed by Tim Risher (2009)
- Rotating Brains/Beating Heart, composed by Franziska Schroeder, Tina Pearson, Pauline Oliveros, Norman Lowrey, and Andreas Müller (2010)
