= Paul Panhuysen =

Dutch composer, visual and sound artist

- Born: 21 August 1934; Maastricht, Netherlands
- Died: 29 January 2015 (aged 80); Eindhoven, Netherlands
- Education: Monumental and Autonomous Art, Jan Van Eyck Academie (1954-1959), Sociology of Art, University of Utrecht (1957-1961)
- Known for: Music, Visual Art

Paul Panhuysen (21 August 1934 – 29 January 2015) was a Dutch composer, visual and sound artist. He founded and directed Het Apollohuis, an art space that functioned during the 80's and 90's having artists doing sound installations, sound sculptures, and concerts about free improvisation, experimental music, and electronic music.

== Personal life ==
Panhuysen was born in Borgharen. He first followed Monumental and Autonomous Art Studies at the Jan van Eyck Academy in Maastricht (1954–1959), and then followed Sociology of Art Studies at the University of Utrecht (1957–1961). Defined as artist, musician, curator, art sociologist and art theoretician, his artistic interests were first inclined towards Abstract Expressionism (until 1964), Minimal art (until 1966) and then Performance art (until nowadays).

Panhuysen’s production is greatly multifaceted though the goal remains contributing to improve the daily life of people. Marked by this social motivation, he organised several events such as the “Road Block” in Veendam (1970) to allow children to play safely at the street. In addition to this, he became Director of the Art School Vredeman de Vries, Leeuwarden (1962–1964) with a focus on raising the quality of education. The social recognition of his work was manifested with the prizes Mention of Honnor, Prix Europe de peinture, Oostende (1962) and Frisiana Award, Leeuwarden (1963), as well as with the job appointments at the Municipal Museum The Hague as member of educational staff (1966) and at the Van Abbemuseum Eindhoven in charge of the Educational and Public Relations Department (1966–1967).

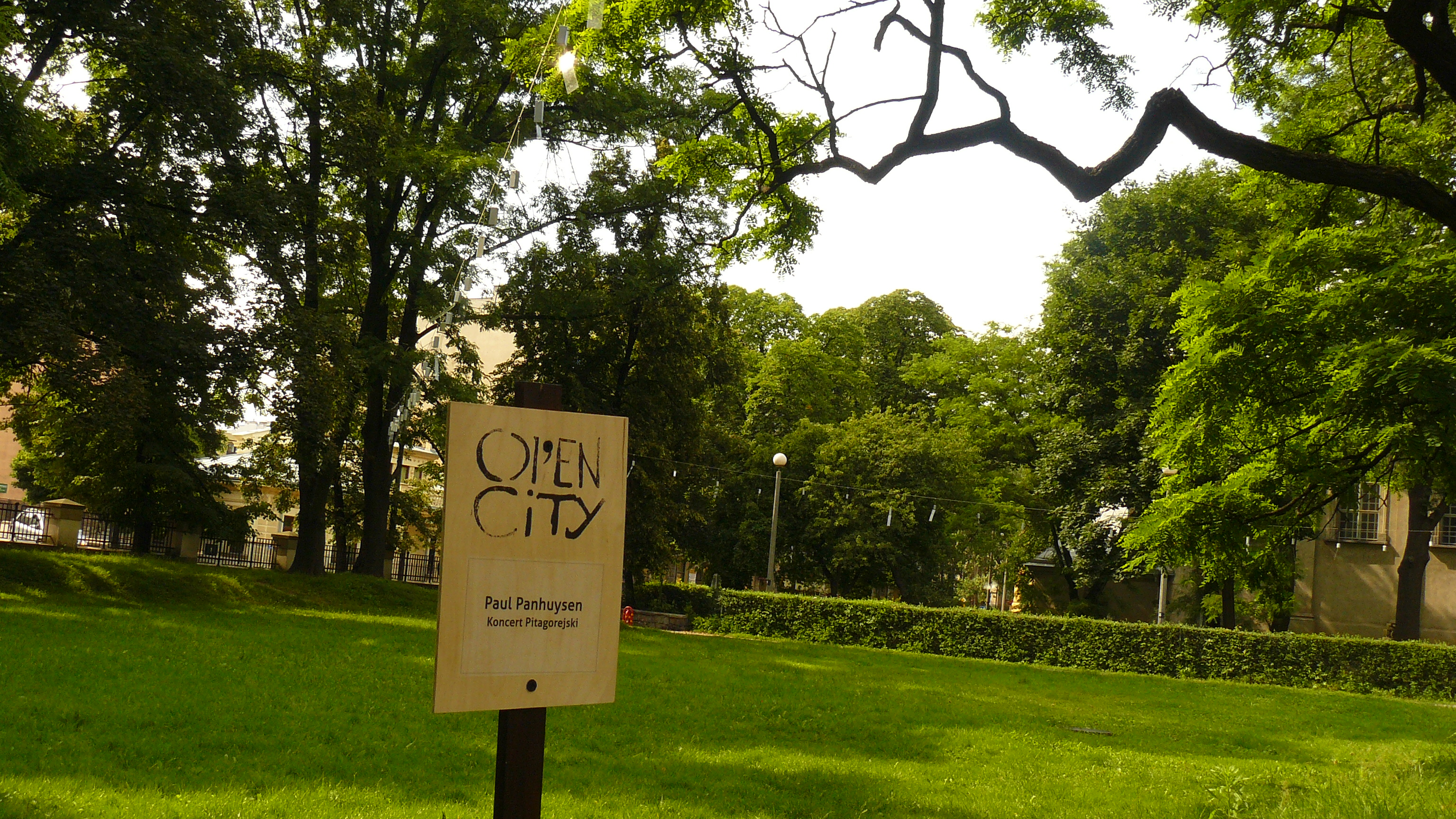
Paul Panhuysen, has made "The Pythagorean Prom" in Lublin.

Social engagement and experimental art were developed under several ways. Panhuysen founded the Band of the Blue Hand (De Bende van de Blauwe Hand) (from 1965), and organized the Museumfeest (Museumparty, 1967) at the Van Abbemuseum with a record of 1,200 visitors. Then he set up the “Free Community of the Global City of Peace and Pleasure” (1967-8), and the “Maciunas Ensemble” (1968-), and from 1980 until 2001 he founded and directed the aforementioned Het Apollohuis, in Eindhoven.

He was a member of the Board of the Federation of Artists Associations (BBK), and founder of the artists unions: OBK and VBBKZN (1969–1981). As an artist-in-residence, he has stayed at the Exploratorium, San Francisco, USA (1993), at the Yellow Springs Institute, Chester Springs, USA (1994), and at the Aomori Contemporary Art Centre, Aomori, Japan (2002). The artist has lately received the Noord-Brabant Cultural Award (1996), Award best exhibition, Galerie Klatovy/Klenová (2000) and Honorary Mention, Prix Ars Electronica, Linz (2004). Paul Panhuysen was invested Companion of the Order of the Netherlands Lion in 1998.

The most known sound installations of this artist were made with strings, crossing the spaces in different ways, and later played by the artist putting rosing in his fingers and using them as a sort of violin bow.

He has released several albums, including:

- Paul Panhuysen and the Galvanos: Lost for Words, in which various recordings are input into several galvanometers, attached to which are metal springs which vibrate more readily at some frequencies over others, and these frequencies are then reamplified.
- Paul Panhuysen: Partitas for Long Strings, which is from the long string installations which Panhuysen has been doing for quite a while.

Maciunas Ensemble, named after George Maciunas of Fluxus fame, was an ensemble founded in 1968 by Paul Panhuysen, Remko Scha and Jan van Riet. Scha left the ensemble in 1982. In 2012 a set of eleven CDs was released of the early years. He has also worked with Arnold Dreyblatt and Ellen Fullman.

Panhuysen died on 29 January 2015 at the age of 80.

== Bibliography ==
- Kuijper, J.A. Paul Panhuysen: Long Strings 1982-2011, Eindhoven: Apollohuis, 2012
- Paul Panhuysen - The Game & the Rules, Dijon, Les presses du réel, 2009.
- Jacobs, P.M.J.E. Beeldend Nederland: biografisch handboek, Tilburg: P.M.J. Jacobs, 1993.
- Veenstra, Irene. My home is your home, Heerlen, Stadsgalerij Heerlen, 1993
- Installationen [Andersen, Panhuysen, Goedhart, Parlevliet, Dreyblatt], Dortmund, Theater-Galerie Fletch Bizzel, 1989
- Panhuysen, Paul; Goedhart, Johan. Snareninstallaties, Eindhoven, Apollohuis, 1985
- Panhuysen, Paul. Metamorphosen: een bewerking van de serie schilderijen: ‘alea iacta sit’, met behulp van fotografie en fotokopie, Eindhoven: Apollohuis, 1982
- Paul Panhuysen: schilderijen, situasies, ordeningssystemen en omgevingsontwerpen – 1960-1978, Eindhoven, Van Abbemuseum, 1978
- Schilderijen van Paul Panhuysen naar aanleiding van gedichten van Michael Tophoff, Leeuwaarden, Maatschappij ter bevordering van Schilder- en Teekenkunst in Friesland, 1963

== Discography ==
- Maciunas Ensemble – The Archives Part 1, 1968-1980 (11× CD, Compilation, 2012, Apollo Records (8) – ACD 091220-091230)
- Maciunas Ensemble – 1976 (2015 LP, Edition Telemark – 314.07)
