= W2 Poppodium =

Willem Twee Poppodium
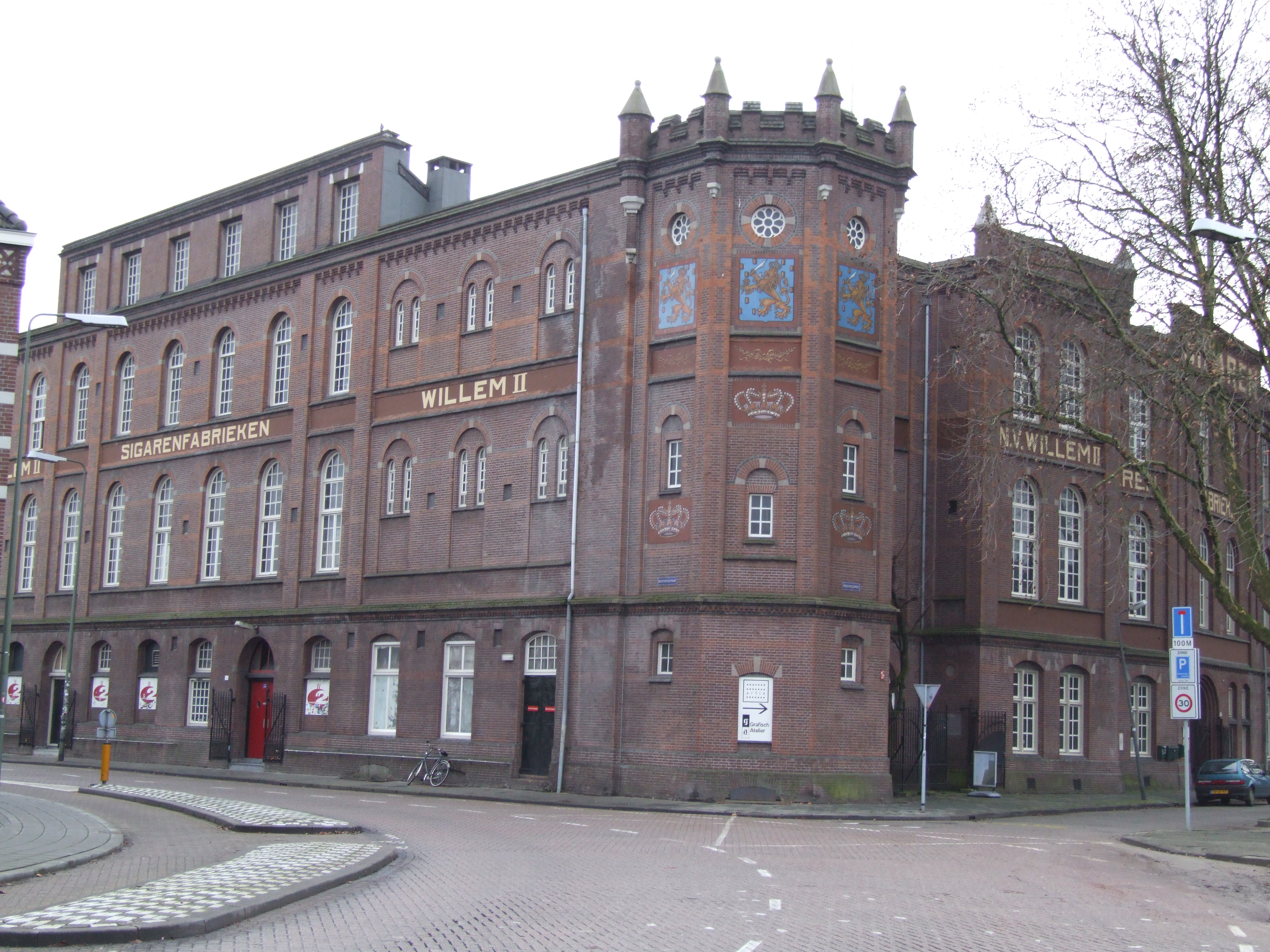
- Willem Twee Poppodium in the former Willem II cigar factory.

- Location within Netherlands
- Alternative names: W2

General information
- Status: music venue
- Location: 's-Hertogenbosch, Netherlands, Boschveldweg 473
- Coordinates: 51.6953°N 5.2967°E
- Opened: 1987

Website
- www.willem-twee.nl

Willem Twee Poppodium is a pop venue in the Dutch city 's-Hertogenbosch. The venue got its current name in 2017. It was formerly known as W2 poppodium (pop venue) and Willem II Concertzaal (concert venue).

Willem Twee Poppodium is situated in a former cigar factory Willem II. Since 2017 they acquired an old synagogue to incorporate it as a classical and jazz venue called Willem Twee Toonzaal. It is located in the Prins Bernhardstraat in 's-Hertogenbosch. The organisation also consists of music studio's, exposition rooms, conference rooms, rehearsal rooms and a café.

== See also ==
- Het Apollohuis
