= Sweep generator =

Piece of electronic test equipment

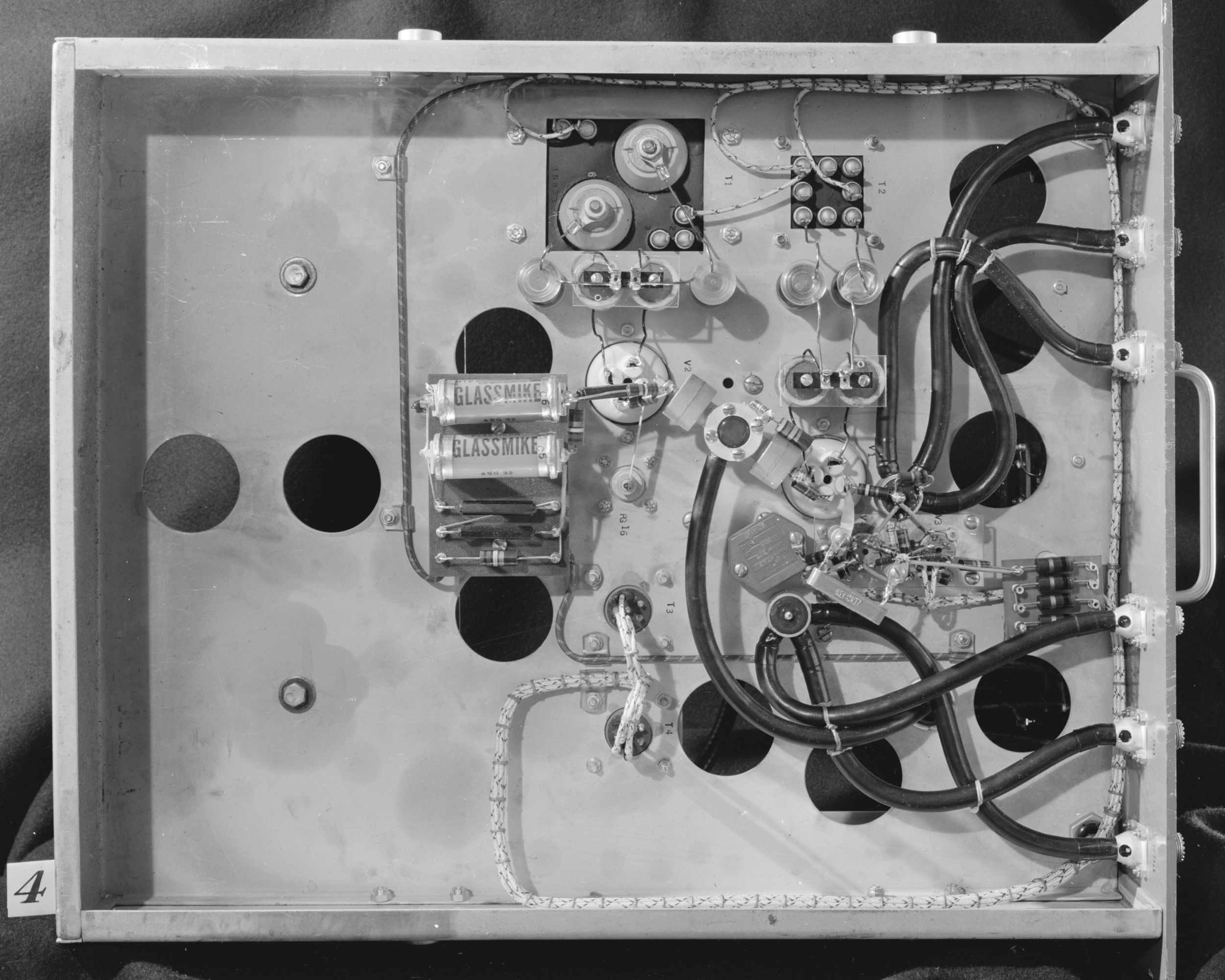
Sweep generator in Lawrence Livermore National Laboratory, 1950

A sweep generator is a piece of electronic test equipment similar to, and sometimes included on, a function generator which creates an electrical waveform with a linearly varying frequency and a constant amplitude. Sweep generators are commonly used to test the frequency response of electronic filter circuits. These circuits are mostly transistor circuits with inductors and capacitors to create linear characteristics.

Sweeps are a popular method in the field of audio measurement to describe the change in a measured output value over a progressing input parameter. The most commonly used progressive input parameter is frequency varied over the standard audio bandwidth of 20 Hz to 20 kHz.

== Glide Sweep ==
A glide sweep (or chirp) is a continuous signal in which the frequency increases or decreases logarithmically with time. This provides the complete range of testing frequencies between the start and stop frequency. An advantage over the stepped sweep is that the signal duration can be reduced by the user without any loss of frequency resolution in the results. This allows for rapid testing. Although the theory behind the glide sweep has been known for several decades, its use in audio measuring devices has only evolved over the past several years. The reason for this lies with the high computing power required.

== Stepped Sweep ==
In a stepped sweep, one variable input parameter (frequency or amplitude) is incremented or decremented in discrete steps. After each change, the analyzer waits until a stable reading is detected before switching to the next step. The scaling of the steps is linear or logarithmic. Since the settling time of different test objects cannot be predicted, the duration of a stepped sweep cannot be determined exactly in advance. For the determination of amplitude or frequency response, the stepped sweep has been largely replaced by the glide sweep. The main application for the stepped sweep is to measure the linearity of systems. Here, the frequency of the test signal is kept constant while the amplitude is varied. Typically the amplitude and distortion of the device under test are measured. This is also referred to as an "amplitude sweep".

== Time Sweep ==
In the case of a time sweep, the x-axis represents time. Again the y-axis represents a measured value, e.g. amplitude. The change in the measured value is observed over time. For example, how does the response of the device under test change over a long period?

== Table Sweep ==
A rarely used special form of the stepped sweep is the table sweep. Here the input signal is produced from a table as a sequence of any frequency and amplitude pairs.

== See also ==
- Radio-frequency sweep
- Wobbulator
