= Ichigenkin =

Japanese musical instrument

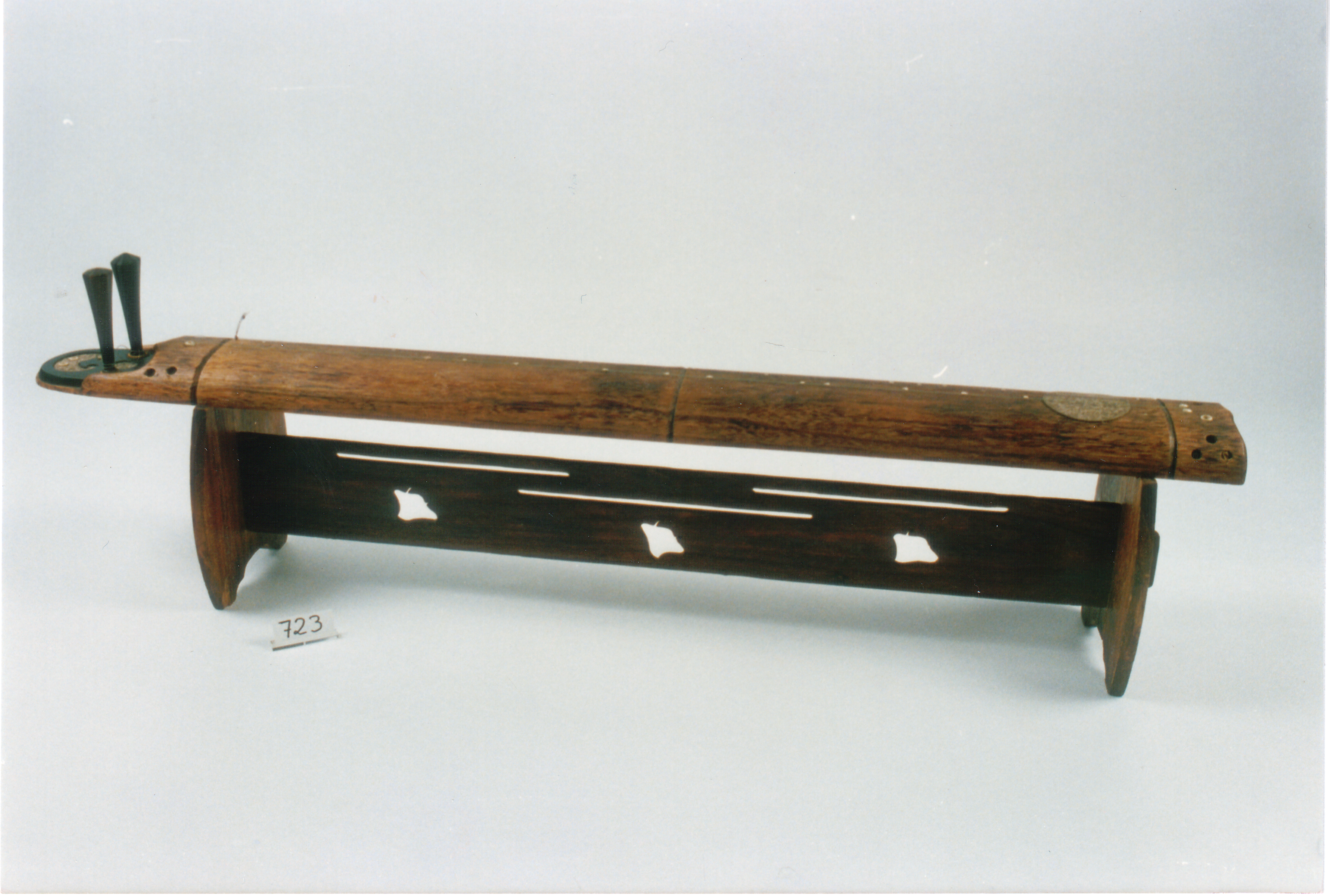
Nigenkin is a close relative of ichigenkin

The ichigenkin (Japanese: 一絃琴; literally "one-string zither" or "Monochord", also sumagoto / 須磨琴) is a Japanese single-stringed plucked zither. Its body is a slender, slightly curved plank carved from kiri (Paulownia tomentosa) wood. Its raw silk string is plucked with a tubular plectrum placed on the index finger of the right hand while a tubular ivory device similar to a guitar slide placed over the middle finger of the left hand slightly depresses the string—though not so hard that it presses against the hardwood soundboard—to vary the pitch. Both the plectrum and slide are referred to as rokan. As with the Chinese guqin, from which it was likely originally adapted, the ichigenkin has no frets, so sliding tones are an important part of the technique of the instrument. Traditionally, the ichigenkin is used to accompany traditional singing, although there are also purely instrumental works in its repertoire. The instrument was once popular among samurai, literati, and priests, but today players of the instrument are very rare. The only unbroken line of ichigenkin transmission is Seikyodo Ichigenkin, whose current Iemoto (hereditary Grand Master) is Issui Minegishi. Minegishi performs widely in North America, Europe, and Asia, and occasionally with Canadian multi-instrumentalist Randy Raine-Reusch, perhaps the only non-Japanese ichigenkin performer, who composes and records new works for the instrument.

A two-string version called a yakumogoto (八雲琴, literally "eight cloud zither") was developed in 1820 by Nakayama Kotonushi. This instrument had a closed back resonant body and a bridge at either end of the strings. The yakumogoto has become strongly associated with the Shinto religion. An open-backed two string version, called the azuma-ryu nigenkin (Eastern school two string zither) was invented in the latter half of the 19th century by Tosha Rosen to perform popular pieces of the time. This version is often simply referred to as nigenkin, literally "two-string zither". A three strings version called sangenkin (三弦琴) was developed in 19th century.

== See also ==
- Music of Japan
- Traditional Japanese musical instruments
