= Remko Scha =

Remko Jan Hendrik Scha (15 September 1945 – 9 November 2015) was a professor of computational linguistics at the faculty of humanities and Institute for Logic, Language and Computation at the University of Amsterdam. He made important contributions to semantics, in particular the treatment of plurals, and to discourse analysis, and laid the foundations for what became an important research paradigm in computational linguistics, Data Oriented Parsing.

He was a composer and performer of algorithmic art. He made recordings of music which has been generated by motor-driven machines. One notable example of this type of music is his 1982 album of electric guitar music, "Machine Guitars", on which all guitars are played by saber saws without human intervention, except for one in which the guitar is played by a rotating wire brush, again with no human intervention. Recorded in Eindhoven and New York, it was described by Byron Coley in The Wire 231 as one of "the definitive modern NYC guitar work[s]", and its influence can be heard in the music of Eli Keszler, Alan Courtis and many more. Performances by The Machines took place in Amsterdam, Brussels, London, Berlin, New York, San Francisco. The most recent performance was in Leiden (2015).

Scha had a longrunning involvement in the arts in the Netherlands. Alongside Paul Panhuysen he founded Het Apollohuis, a former cigar factory in Eindhoven which became a space for performance, art and music in 1980. It played host to performers such as Ellen Fullman, whose The Long String Instrument LP was recorded there in the venue's first year. Scha also founded the Institute of Artificial Art Amsterdam. In IAAA he brought together machines, computers, algorithms and human persons to work together toward the complete automatization of art production. With IAAA collaborators Remko developed machines and algorithms for the production of random artworks in a range of fields: music, drawing, architecture, graphical and product design, facial expressions. On the radicalart.info site he created an extensive analytical anthology of anti-art and meta-art that lists and discusses the art historical sources that informed his artistic views. Maciunas Ensemble was an ensemble founded in 1968 by Paul Panhuysen, Remko Scha and Jan van Riet. Scha left the ensemble in 1982. In 2012 a set of eleven CDs was released of the period Scha was involved in the ensemble.

== Discography ==
- Maciunas Ensemble – The Archives Part 1, 1968-1980 (11× CD, Compilation, 2012, Apollo Records (8) – ACD 091220-091230)
- Maciunas Ensemble – 1976 (2015 LP, Edition Telemark – 314.07)
- Remko Scha – Guitar Mural 1 Featuring The Machines (1981, Cassette, Album, C60 Taal Beeld Geluid)
- Remko Scha – Machine Guitars (1982, LP Kremlin KR 006)
- Remko Scha And The Machines* – As Is - Guitar Mural #14 (1990, Staalplaat – ST-CD 011, Helmholtz Theater – HT 3)
- Remko Scha & Van Lagestein – Pomp Pump (1994 CD Helmholtz Theater – HT400
