= Envelope (disambiguation) =

An envelope is the paper container used to hold a letter being sent by post.

Envelope may also refer to:

== Mathematics ==
- Envelope (mathematics), a curve, surface, or higher-dimensional object defined as being tangent to a given family of lines or curves (or surfaces, or higher-dimensional objects, respectively)
- Envelope (category theory)

== Science ==
- Viral envelope, the membranal covering surrounding the capsid of a virus
- Cell envelope of a bacterium, consisting of the cell membrane, cell wall and outer membrane
- Airship § Envelope, the fabric skin covering the airship
- Building envelope, the exterior layer of a building that protects it from the elements
- Envelope (motion), a solid representing all positions that an object may occupy during its normal range of motion
- Envelope (music), the variation of a sound over time, as is used in sound synthesis
- Envelope (radar), the volume of space where a radar system is required to reliably detect an object
- Envelope (waves), a curve outlining the peak values of an oscillating waveform or signal
- Envelope detector, an electronic circuit used to measure the envelope of a waveform
- Flight envelope, the limits within which an aircraft can operate

== Entertainment ==
- Envelopes (band), an indie/pop band from Sweden and France, based in the UK
- Envelope (film), a 2012 film
- "Envelopes", a song by Frank Zappa from his 1982 album Ship Arriving Too Late to Save a Drowning Witch

== Other uses ==
- Envelope (military), attacking one or both of the enemy's flanks to encircle the enemy
- The envelope of an internet email, its SMTP routing information
- Envelope system, a method of personal budgeting where money is allocated for specific purposes
- Gaza envelope, a region in southwestern Israel adjacent to the Gaza Strip

== See also ==
- Two envelopes problem, a paradox
- Stellar envelope (disambiguation), for astrophysics uses
