= Panaiotis =

American singer

Panaiotis, also known as Peter Ward, is an American vocalist and composer, currently living in Albuquerque. He received his Master of Music degree from New England Conservatory and a Ph.D. in music from the University of California, San Diego.

He has collaborated with composer and accordionist Pauline Oliveros, together co-founding the Deep Listening Band, and Indian santurist Nandkishor Muley.

== Discography ==
- The Ballad of Frankie Silver (1994)
- Rising Sun (2001), with Nandkishor Muley

Performer

- Deep Listening (1989)
- The Ready Made Boomerang (1991)
- Troglodyte's Delight (1990)

== Musical software ==
In 2014, Panaiotis brought his software and compositional talents to create *Bandojo, an app that lets novices create melodies in accompaniment with musical textures, and jam together with friends. The iOS version was done in collaboration with Andrew Stone.
