= Stellar envelope =

Stellar envelope may mean:

- The region of a star that transports energy from the stellar core to the stellar atmosphere
- Common envelope in a binary system
