= Ellen Fullman =

American classical composer

- Born: 1957 (age 68–69); Memphis, Tennessee
- Occupations: composer, instrument builder, performer

Ellen Fullman (born 1957) is an American composer, instrument builder, and performer. She is known for her 70-foot (21-meter) Long String instrument, tuned in just intonation and played with rosin-coated fingers.

== Biography and work ==
Fullman studied sculpture at the Kansas City Art Institute before moving to New York in the early 1980s. In Kansas City she created and performed in an amplified metal sound-producing skirt and wrote art songs which she recorded in New York for a small cassette label. In 1981, she began developing the Long String Instrument at her studio in Brooklyn, consisting of dozens of metallic strings played with rosin-coated fingers and producing a chorus of organ-like partials. This instrument has been compared to the experience of standing inside an enormous grand piano. She has recorded extensively with this unusual instrument and has collaborated with such luminary figures as composer Pauline Oliveros, choreographer Deborah Hay, the Kronos Quartet, and Frances-Marie Uitti. In 1985, she was in residence at the Apollohuis in the Netherlands, where she recorded The Long String Instrument (LP) for Apollo Records.

== Recognition ==
Fullman has been the recipient of numerous awards, commissions and residencies, including:

- a Foundation for Contemporary Arts Grants to Artists Award (2015)
- a McKnight Visiting Composer Residency from American Composers Forum (2010)
- Artist-In-Residence, Headlands Center for the Arts (2008)
- Center for Cultural Innovation Investing in Artists Grant (2008)
- Japan/U.S. Friendship Commission/NEA Fellowship for Japan (2007)
- DAAD Artists-in-Berlin Program residency (2000)
- Artist Trust/Washington State Arts Commission Fellowship (1999)
- Meet the Composer, Reader's Digest Consortium Commission (1993).

Her performance with Austin New Music Co-op at the Seaholm Power Plant was given a Critic's Table Award for Best Chamber Performance, 2009-2010.

Fullman has performed in numerous festivals, art spaces, and museums, including: New Albion at Bard SummerScape, a Norway tour presented by NY Musik, Instal, Glasgow, Lincoln Center Out of Doors, Festival van Vlaanderen, Brussels, Künstlerhaus Stuttgart, Other Minds, San Francisco, Romanische Sommer Köln, Columbia University, Donaueschinger Musiktage, Walker Art Center, ISCM World Music Days, and New Music America 1980, 1984 and 1986. Her music has been represented in exhibits including: The American Century; Art and Culture, 1950–2000, Whitney Museum of American Art; Listening, Pompidou Center (2004); and Volume: Bed of Sound, P.S.1 (2000).

Peter Esmonde directed a documentary film on Fullman's work, 5 Variations on a Long String. The film was premiered at SXSW. Using archival footage, Fullman edited Suspended Music, a documentary film on her collaboration with Pauline Oliveros's Deep Listening Band, which premiered at the Pacific Film Archive, UC Berkeley (2004). Fullman wrote an article on her work for MusikTexte (Cologne 2002), subsequently published in MusicWorks (Toronto 2003). She has been interviewed for NPR's Morning Edition, the Wire and Signal to Noise.

== Works ==
Fullman's works include:

- Fluctuations, with trombonist Monique Buzzarté (Deep Listening Institute), selected as one of the top 50 recordings of 2008 by The Wire (London) and awarded an Aaron Copland Fund for Music Recording Program Grant
- Ort, recorded with Berlin collaborator Konrad Sprenger (Choose Records), selected as one of the top 50 recordings of 2004 by The Wire
- Suspended Music, in collaboration with Deep Listening Band (Periplum)
- Change of Direction (New Albion)
- Body Music (XI).

Fullman's commissioned works include:

- Post Futurist Reverie, for the project: Music for 16 Futurist Noise Intoners (replicas of Luigi Russolos Intonarumori), curated by Luciano Chessa and presented by the San Francisco Museum of Modern Art
- a piece for Trimpin's Klavier Nonette, an installation of nine MIDI-controlled toy pianos.

Fullman has presented numerous lectures on her work, including:

- the Songlines series, Center for Contemporary Music, Mills College
- Improv:21 a lecture series presented by Rova:Arts, San Francisco.

Other performances and projects include:

- Issue Project Room, Propensity of Sound series, May 22, 2011
- a split LP release with Eleh on Important Records.

Ellen Fullman's album The Long Instrument has been reissued on vinyl by Superior Viaduct. The recording is from her 1985 residency at Het Apollohuis in Eindhoven, Holland.
