= Fylkingen =

Performing arts venue in Stockholm, Sweden

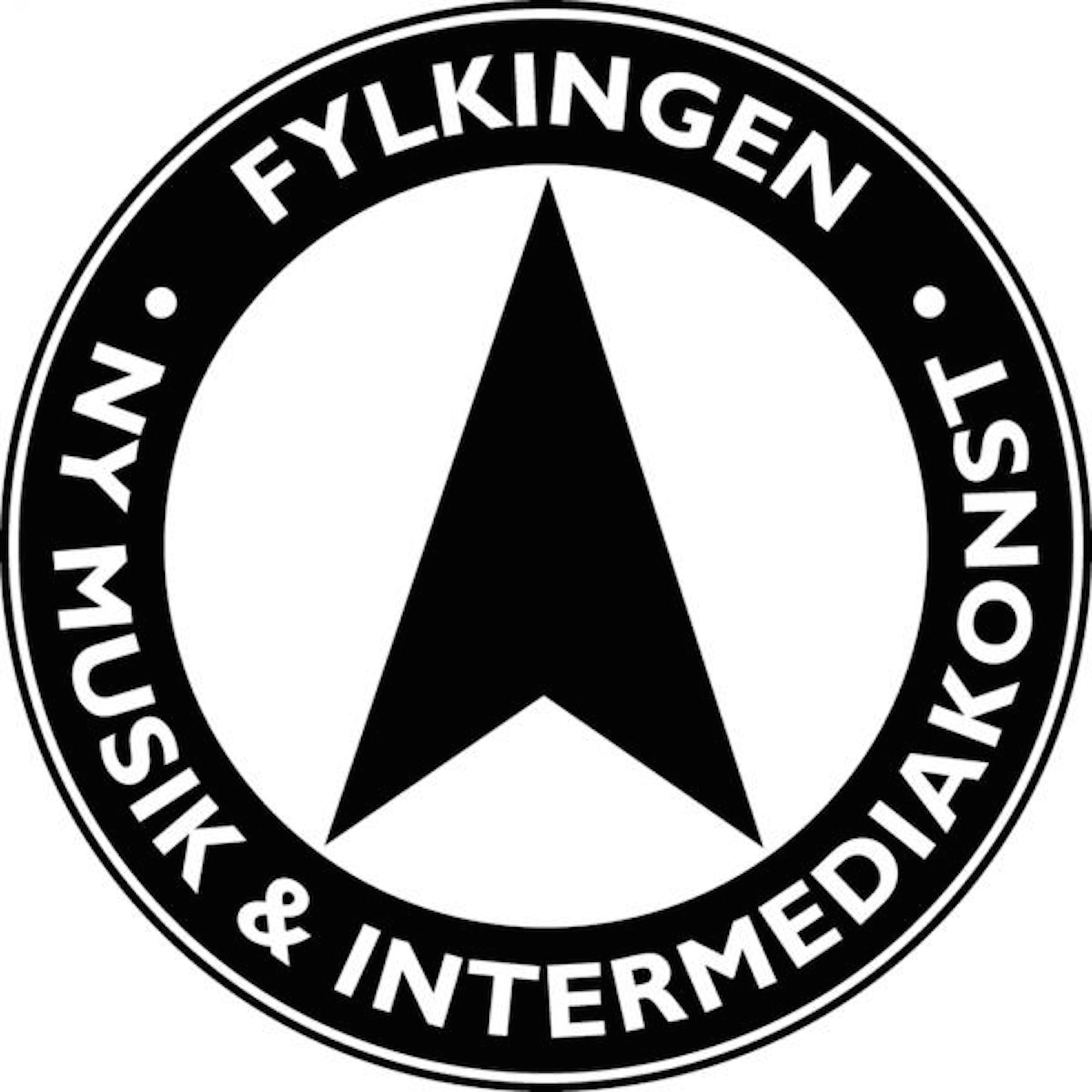
Fylkingen logo.

Fylkingen - New Music and Intermedia Art is an artist-run venue and member based organisation committed to contemporary experimental performing arts. Over 300 artists from various disciplines use the space to develop and present new work. Today Fylkingen represents a wide field of artistic practices, including EAM (electro acoustic music), dance, performance art, video art, improvisation music, sound art, etc. It also produces and distributes recorded material through its own label Fylkingen Records since 1966. It is also from the same year that Fylkingen started to publish its own periodicals intermittently.

== History ==
Fylkingen was established in 1933 in Stockholm, Sweden, then focusing on contemporary composers and a traditional repertoire. Over the years, the organization branched out into new art forms.

Fylkingen was founded in 1933 as a Chamber Music Society of musicians and composers in order to highlight the new music of contemporary composers in combination with a traditional repertoire. Composer Ingemar Liljefors served as the organization's first Chairman from 1933-1946.

The interest in new music eventually led to that Fylkingen in cooperation with the Swedish Radio presented the first concert of electroacoustic music in Sweden in 1952, as well as Fylkingen organising in 1963 the very first concerts of computer music, or data machine music as it was then called.

Fylkingen’s concerts of electronic music attracted the attention of composers worldwide for its high sound quality and unconventional presentation format, for example Promenade Concerts with electronic music, music simultaneously in several rooms with different acoustic conditions and landscape music in Stockholm parks.

In the 1960s as the organisation radicalised more, more art forms took place at Fylkingen: performance art, dance, happenings, and text-sound compositions. At the time, many of Fylkingen’s concerts took place at Moderna Museet, with a detour to other premises in Stockholm and around Scandinavia.

The programs from the 1960s and 1970s are filled with performances by international avant-gardes: John Cage, David Tudor, Iannis Xenakis, Pierre Boulez, Morton Subotnick, Ravi Shankar, Terry Riley, Karlheinz Stockhausen, Nam June Paik, Henri Chopin, La Monte Young, Pauline Oliveros, Max Neuhaus, Yvonne Rainer, Merce Cunningham, Antonin Artaud, Robert Morris (artist), Carolee Schneeman, Charlotte Moorman, side by side with major Swedish composers such as Åke Hodell, Lars-Gunnar Bodin, Öyvind Fahlström, Sten Hanson, Folke Rabe and Catherine Christer Hennix.

In 1971 Fylkingen opened its first own stage on Östgötagatan 33 in Stockholm. In 1986 Fylkingen moved to its current premises in Münchenbryggeriet (the Munich Brewery), next door to the EMS (Elektronmusikstudion/Electronic Music Studio) which has been the center of the Swedish electroacoustic music and sound art since its start in 1964. Fylkingen was in the 1960s the driving force behind the foundation of EMS. The two organisations have continued their tightly linked collaboration since then.

In connection with the move to Münchenbryggeriet in 1986, the organisation became bigger. It is also around this time Fylkingen started to include much of the improvisational music of Sweden as well as early video screenings. The visiting artists to the new stage at Münchenbryggeriet include among others, François Bayle, Brian Eno, Steina Vasulka, Merzbow, Chris Cutler, Kaffe Matthews, Genesis P-Orridge, Carsten Nicolai, Damo Suzuki, Geoff Leigh, Chris Watson, Andre Stitt, Tara Transistory, Gudrun Gut, etc.

Also significant to point out is the fact that in the 1980s many Swedish choreographers were based at Fylkingen: Efva Lilja, Per Jonsson, Susanne Valentin, Irene Hultman, Björn Elisson, Anne Külper, Margaretha Åsberg and Susanne Jaresand (then Håkansson) to name a few. The substantial development of contemporary dance over the past few decades could happen in Sweden thanks to Fylkingen’s open space. Many of the choreographers who started at Fylkingen later moved on to other venues when they became available: Modern Dance Theatre which established its guest stage on Skeppsholmen in 1986, the House of Dance which opened its scene in 1991, as well as the House of Cultures which also focused on dance for example. Choreographers and dancers have been active at Fylkingen during different periods of time, and today is yet another new generation of choreographers active in the organisation along with an older generation. A newly built-in dance floor, renovated in autumn 2015, makes Fylkingen an excellent venue for dancers, a commitment of Fylkingen to continue with its tradition to promote and support dance scenes in Sweden.

Today Fylkingen presents over a hundred events a year and continues to play a significant role in contemporary music and art by being a stage, a platform and a place that provide space for artistic freedom necessary for experimental and radical artistic work. Fylkingen is unique by being the world's oldest artist-run scene of its kind.

== Fylkingen Records ==
Fylkingen Records, also called Fyrec, has since 1966 produced a series of important records with emphasis on electro-acoustic music and new chamber music. Fylkingen Records also has a record store at Fylkingen. The shop sell discs from Fylkingen Records catalog, as well as many odd, exclusive editions and rarities from a variety of other record labels specialising in experimental music in various forms. Fyrec aims to present disc editions that take advantage of Fylkingen’s rich heritage of electronic and experimental art music, and also highlights interesting composers and sound artists from a conscious gender and norm-critical perspective.

== Fylkingen Journals ==
Since the 1960s, Fylkingen has intermittently published periodicals (Fylkingen Bulletin/Fylkingen International Bulletin 1966-1968 and 1983, Hz-Fylkingens Bulletin 1992-93, and Hz Journal online 2000–present). Resting on "the foundation for Fylkingen to engage in 'Art & Technology' problematics” laid in 1965 by Knut Wiggen (then the chairperson), the journals often explore cutting-edge up-to-date issues of contemporary art and music in conjunction with technology and science. The artists and researchers whose articles are presented in these journals include John Cage (1966), Pierre Schaeffer (1967, 1968), Alvin Lucier (1967), Nam June Paik (1967), John R. Pierce (1967), Kim Cascone (2003), Pauline Oliveros (2011), and Roy Ascott (2011), and Atau Tanaka (2019).

Fylkingen’s online journal Hz-journal can be found at http://www.hz-journal.org.

Fylkingen’s online archives of historical journals are found at http://www.hz-journal.org/historical

== Books and Archives ==
In connection with Fylkingen’s 60th anniversary in 1993 Fylkingen published a book about the history of the society: "Sixty years of radical and experimental art 1933–1993.” The book contains, in addition to a detailed list of events, articles, essays and photographs that reflect on the society's long history. In autumn 2013, Fylkingen published a new book in connection with the 80th anniversary, "FYLKINGEN 80!". The new book picks up where the former left off and continues to portray the activities until 2012.

Fylkingen also has an extensive archive of audio and video recordings, posters, articles, publications and programs, since the fall of 2012 kept in the Music and Arts Library in Stockholm.
