= Louis Helbig =

Canadian photographer

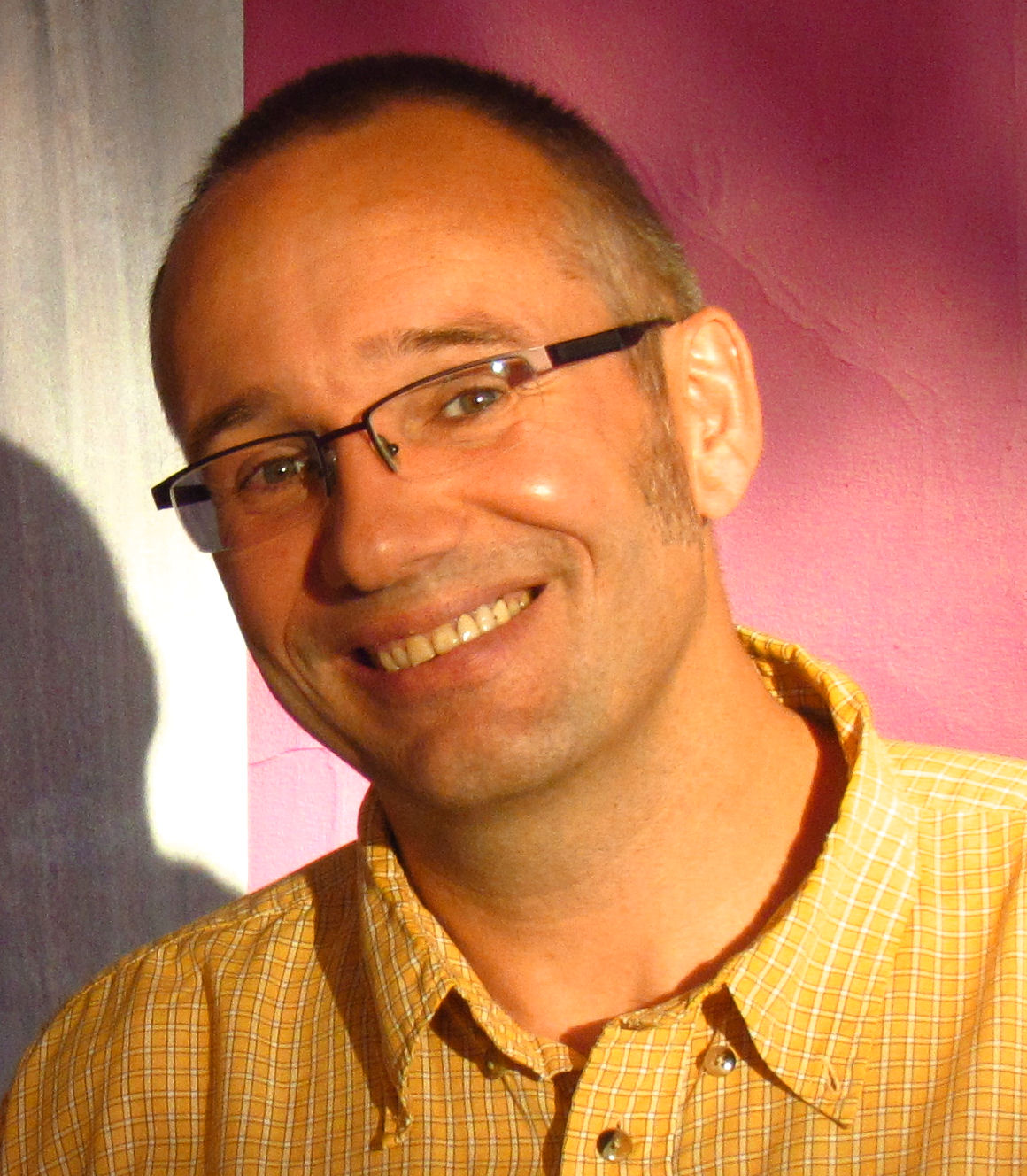
- Born: Louis Helbig; November 1964 (age 61); Toronto, Ontario, Canada
- Education: McGill University, London School of Economics
- Known for: Photographer, artist

Louis Helbig (born in Toronto, Ontario) is a Canadian aerial photographer who takes photographs from a two-seater aircraft that he pilots. He is best known for photographic projects entitled: "Beautiful Destruction – Alberta Tar Sands" and "Sunken Villages"; the latter has pictures of the villages flooded during the creation of the St. Lawrence Seaway.

== Early life and education ==
His parents immigrated from Germany in 1961. He grew up in Williams Lake, B.C. where his father owned and operated a logging truck and exposed Helbig to aviation. Helbig is self-taught as a photographer. His first photographic forays were through his high school outdoors and camera club. Helbig was a member of Canada's national Nordic ski team, is a Canadian champion and represented Canada at the 1987 Nordic World Championships in Oberstdorf, West Germany. He obtained his pilot's license in 2000. Before turning to commercial photography and art in 2005, Helbig worked as a civil servant in Victoria, BC and Ottawa, ON. He has also worked a bush pilot.

=== Education ===
- 2007–2008, The Art of Inkjet Printmaking & Photojournalism & Documentary Photography courses at the School of Photographic Arts: Ottawa (SPAO)
- 2006–2007, Photoshop (Introduction & Advanced) courses at Algonquin College, Ottawa
- 1996–1997, Uppsala University, Sweden. preliminary Ph.D. studies
- 1995–1996, London School of Economics. Master of Science, Economic History
- 1991–1995, McGill University, Montreal, Canada. Bachelor of Arts, Great Distinction: Political Science, Economics, & International Development

=== Photography & art ===
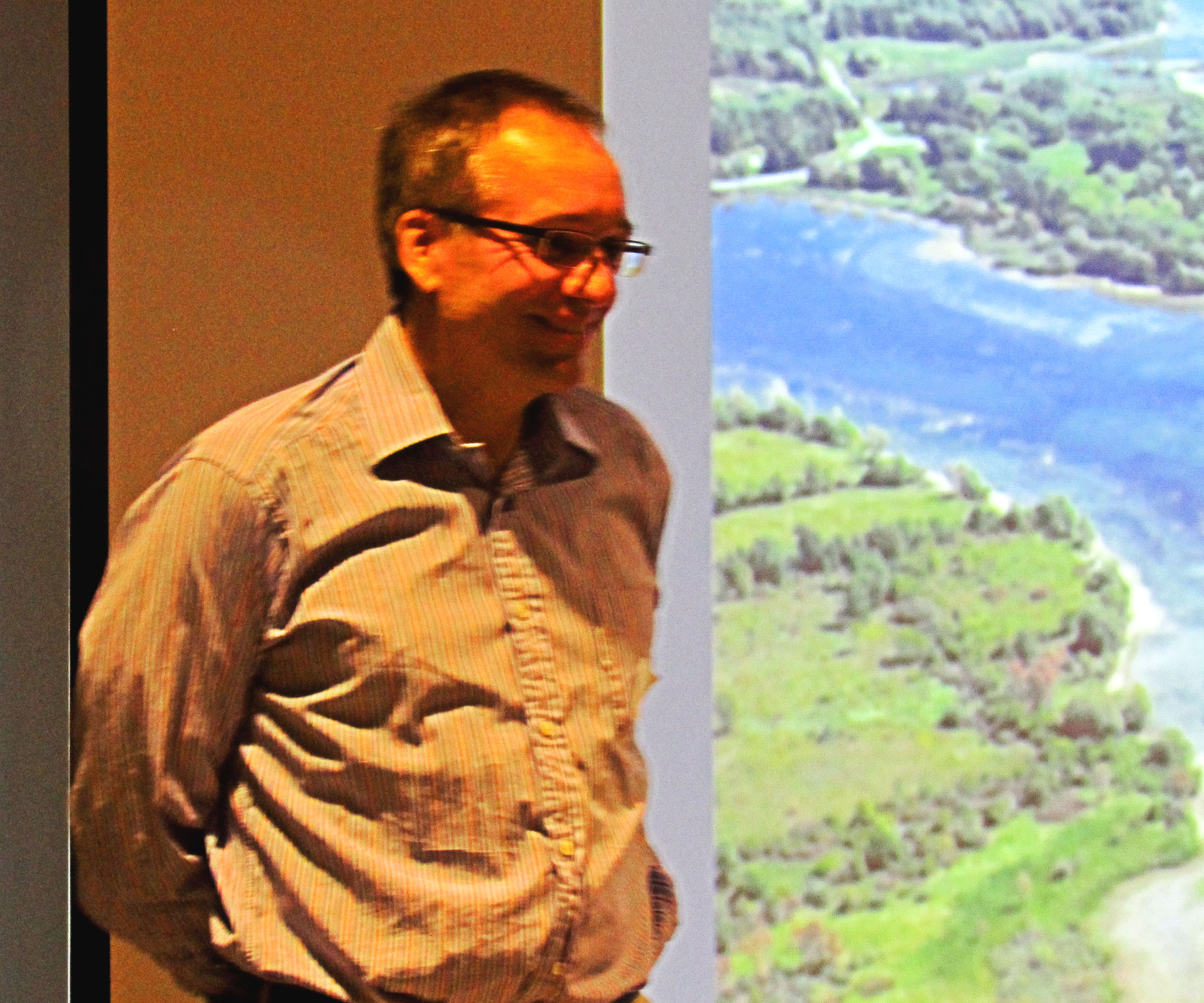
At presentation about Sunken Villages along the St. Lawrence River

Helbig's style has been described as teetering between documentary and abstract. Helbig's approach whatever the subject is not to editorialize but to use his imagery to provide viewers the space, in their own imaginations, to reflect, imagine and think for themselves.

His work is held in the Ontario Government Art Collection.

He was elected to the Ontario Society of Artists in 2010.

== Exhibitions ==
- Corridor Gallery, Mississippi Mills & Almonte Library & Chambers: Almonte, ON, Canada. Beautiful Destruction. Feb 2 – April 12, 2012
- John B Aird Gallery, Queens Park, Toronto, ON, Canada. Ontario Society of Artists New Members Show, Dec 2011 – Jan 2012. Joint exhibition
- Jordan Art Gallery, Jordan, ON. June 2011. "Aerial Abstractions"
- Canvas Gallery, Toronto. Inaugural exhibition of "Sunken Villages," Toronto Contact Photography Festival 2011. May 2011.
- Ottawa Art Gallery. Mar–Apr 2011. Inaugural "Confessions" exhibition
- Exposure Gallery, Ottawa. Jan–Mar 2011. "Aerial Abstractions"
- Ottawa City Hall Art Gallery, July–Sept 2010. "Beautiful Destruction – Alberta Tar Sands Aerial Photographs" Juried selection in 2009 for Ottawa’s premier public professional art gallery.
- The Rivoli, Toronto. May–July 2010. Contact Toronto Photography Festival. "Beautiful Destruction"
- galleryDK, Toronto. March 2010. "Beautiful Destruction"
- Frederic Remington Art Museum, Ogdensburg, New York City. 5th biannual International Juried Art Exhibit Nov 2009 – Jan 2010. Juried: select work, joint exhibition.
- University of Ottawa. Campus. Nov 2009 – Jan 2010. "Beautiful Destruction"
- Arts and Architecture Gallery, Ottawa. July 2009. "Beautiful Destruction"
- Viva Vida Gallery, Pointe-Claire (Montréal) QC, Canada. June – July 2009. Selected works.
- Ottawa International Writers’ Festival & Saint Brigids Centre for the Arts & Humanities. April 2009. "Beautiful Destruction"
- Red Wall Gallery, School of Photographic Arts Ottawa (SPAO) "Over and Under, Aerial & Underwater Photographs." joint exhibition with Ric Frazier. May 2008.

== Notable works ==
- "Beautiful Destruction – Alberta Tar Sands Aerial Photographs"
- "Sunken Villages"
