= Wobbulator =

A wobbulator is an electronic device primarily used for the alignment of receiver or transmitter intermediate frequency strips. It is usually used in conjunction with an oscilloscope, to enable a visual representation of a receiver's passband to be seen, hence simplifying alignment; it was used to tune early consumer AM radios. The term "wobbulator" is a portmanteau of wobble and oscillator. A "wobbulator" (without capitalization) is a generic term for the swept-output RF oscillator described above, a frequency-modulated oscillator, also called a "sweep generator" by most professional electronics engineers and technicians. A wobbulator was used in some old microwave signal generators to create what amounted to frequency modulation. It physically altered the size of the klystron cavity, therefore changing the frequency.

When capitalised, "Wobbulator" refers to the trade name of a specific brand of RF/IF alignment generator. The Wobbulator was made by a company known as "TIC" (Tel-Instrument Company) although some units branded "Allen B. Du Mont Laboratories" and "Stromberg-Carlson" are rumoured to exist. These were apparently made under some form of license and branded with the name of the licensee, much as Radio Corporation of America through subsidiary Hazeltine Corp., licensed its KCS-20A television chassis design (used in models 630TS, 8TS30, etc.) to other television manufacturers (Air King, Crosley, Fada, et al.) for production under their brand names. The Wobbulator generator, designated model 1200A, combined sweep and marker functions into a single self-contained pushbutton controlled device which, when connected to an oscilloscope and television receiver under test, would display a representation of the receiver's RF/IF response curves with "markers" defining critical frequency reference points as a response curve on the oscilloscope screen. Such an amplitude-versus-frequency graph is also often referred to as a Bode (pronounced "bodee") graph or Bode plot.

In the 1960s a device described as a wobbulator was made by instrument company Brüel & Kjær. It was an audio-frequency oscillator with an adjustable frequency modulation. The purpose of the modulation was in acoustic characterisation of architectural spaces, where it prevented the build-up of resonances during measurement.

Another implementation of wobbulators were designed and implemented in the mid-1980's at Singer-Link Flight Simulation. It was determined that due to the orientation of the CRT's checklists and other similarly formatted text at the simulator's control panels created a situation where checklists had to be scrolled through, line-by-line or page-by-page, to complete. Checklists that could fit on one screen made it more efficient to follow and/or troubleshoot. The implementation of x- and y- axis wobbulators overcame the problems encountered.
