= Deep Listening Band =

US musical ensemble

- from left to right: David Gamper, Pauline Oliveros, Stuart Dempster

Background information
- Origin: United States
- Genres: Avant-garde, experimental, contemporary classical
- Instruments: Accordion, didjeridu, trombone, electronics, keyboards, experimental instruments, found objects, voice
- Years active: 1988-present
- Labels: Deep Listening, New Albion, Taiga Records, Za Discs, Important
- Members: Stuart Dempster; Pauline Oliveros
- Past members: David Gamper; Panaiotis
- Website: deeplistening.org

The Deep Listening Band (DLB) was founded in 1988 by Pauline Oliveros (accordion, "expanded instrument system", composition), Stuart Dempster (trombone, didjeridu, composition) and Panaiotis (vocals, electronics, composer). David Gamper (keyboards, electronics) replaced Panaiotis in 1990.

The band is named after Oliveros' term, concept, program and registered servicemark of the Deep Listening Institute, Ltd., Deep Listening, and specializes in performing and recording in resonant or reverberant spaces such as cathedrals and huge underground cisterns including the 2-million-US-gallon (7,600 m^{3}) Fort Worden Cistern which has a 45-second reverberation time.

== Milestones and collaborations ==
Deep Listening Band recorded its first, self titled album at Fort Worden Cistern in Port Townsend, WA on October 8, 1988. Al Swanson is credited with the on location recording, while Swanson and Dempster collaborated in editing the recording in December 1988. The initial name "The Deep Listening Band" and the corresponding initialism "DLB" were coined during the winter of 1988/1989. In 1991 the name became "Deep Listening Band", without a "The".

DLB collaborated with Ellen Fullman and her Long String Instrument resulting in the Suspended Music release by Periplum Records in 1993. The band also performed, recorded, and released a trope on John Cage's 4'33". Non Stop Flight, a 70-minute excerpt from the 4 hours and 33' trope recorded in September 1996 at the Mills College concert hall, was released by Music & Arts. Unquenchable Fire with the Joe McPhee Quartet, inspired by the novel of the same name, was released on the Deep Listening Label in 2003. The same year saw the release Deep Time featuring Swiss experimental percussionist Fritz Hauser as special guest.

In 2008 DLB celebrated 20 years with a series of events beginning in August at Bard College as part of New Albion Records’ 25th Anniversary. The bands anniversary celebrations culminated in a performance on October 24, 2008 at Roulette (Location 1) in NYC. On the same day Taiga Records released the double LP Then & Now, Now & Then, a compilation of mostly unreleased recording excerpts from 1990 to 2006. The performance at Roulette and the performance at Big Twig Studio in the Catskills on the following day were presented as part of IONE’s 13th Annual Dream Festival.

While 2011 was a highly productive year for DLB, it also marked the tragic loss of long time band member David Gamper in September. Supported by Matt Turner (e-cello), Rebecca Salzer, Jeff Wallace (movement), members of IGLU (Improvisation Group at Lawrence University), Larry Darling (sound) and Jillian Johnson (administration) DLB dedicated the October 29, 2011 performance at Lawrence University in Appleton, WI to the memory of David Gamper. As a tribute to Gamper DLB released three albums featuring the long time trio Dempster, Gamper and Oliveros: Octagonal Polyphony (Important Records, vinyl), Great Howl at Town Hall (Important Records, CD) and Needle Drop Jungle (Taiga Records, vinyl).

The band celebrated its 25th anniversary with a weeklong residency culminating in a concert at the Dunrobin Sonic Gym in Ontario, Canada in October 2013. On this occasion the band employed the Cistern Simulation Technology, a simulation of the Fort Worden Cistern acoustics, developed by Jonas Braasch, Director of the Center for Cognition, Communication, and Culture at Rensselaer Polytechnic Institute. Both residency and concert featured founding members Pauline Oliveros and Stuart Dempster as well as special guests Jonas Braasch (saxophone), Jesse Stewart (percussion, sonic artifacts) and Johannes Welsch (gongs). The concert, which opened with an invocation by IONE (author, playwright, director), was recorded by Braasch and Welsch, and released by Deep Listening as Dunrobin Sonic Gems on October 8, 2014, marking the 26th anniversary of the seminal Fort Worden Cistern recording. On this occasion DLB also released "Johina", an excerpt from the soundcheck preceding the concert, as a standalone composition for download.

== Discography ==
- 2014: Dunrobin Sonic Gems with IONE, Jonas Braasch, Jesse Stewart and Johannes Welsch
- 2013: Looking Back with Joe McPhee and Randy Raine-Reusch
- 2012: Octagonal Polyphony
- 2012: Great Howl at Town Haul
- 2012: Needle Drop Jungle
- 2008: Then & Now, Now & Then (double LP)
- 2003: Deep Time with Fritz Hauser
- 2003: Unquenchable Fire with Joe McPhee Quartet
- 1998: Non Stop Flight (live album)
- 1995: Sanctuary
- 1995: Tosca Salad
- 1993: Suspended Music
- 1991: The Ready Made Boomerang
- 1990: Troglodyte's Delight
- 1989: Deep Listening
