= Stuart Dempster =

American trombonist, scholar, and professor

Stuart Dempster (born July 7, 1936 in Berkeley, California) is a trombonist, didjeridu player, improviser, and composer.

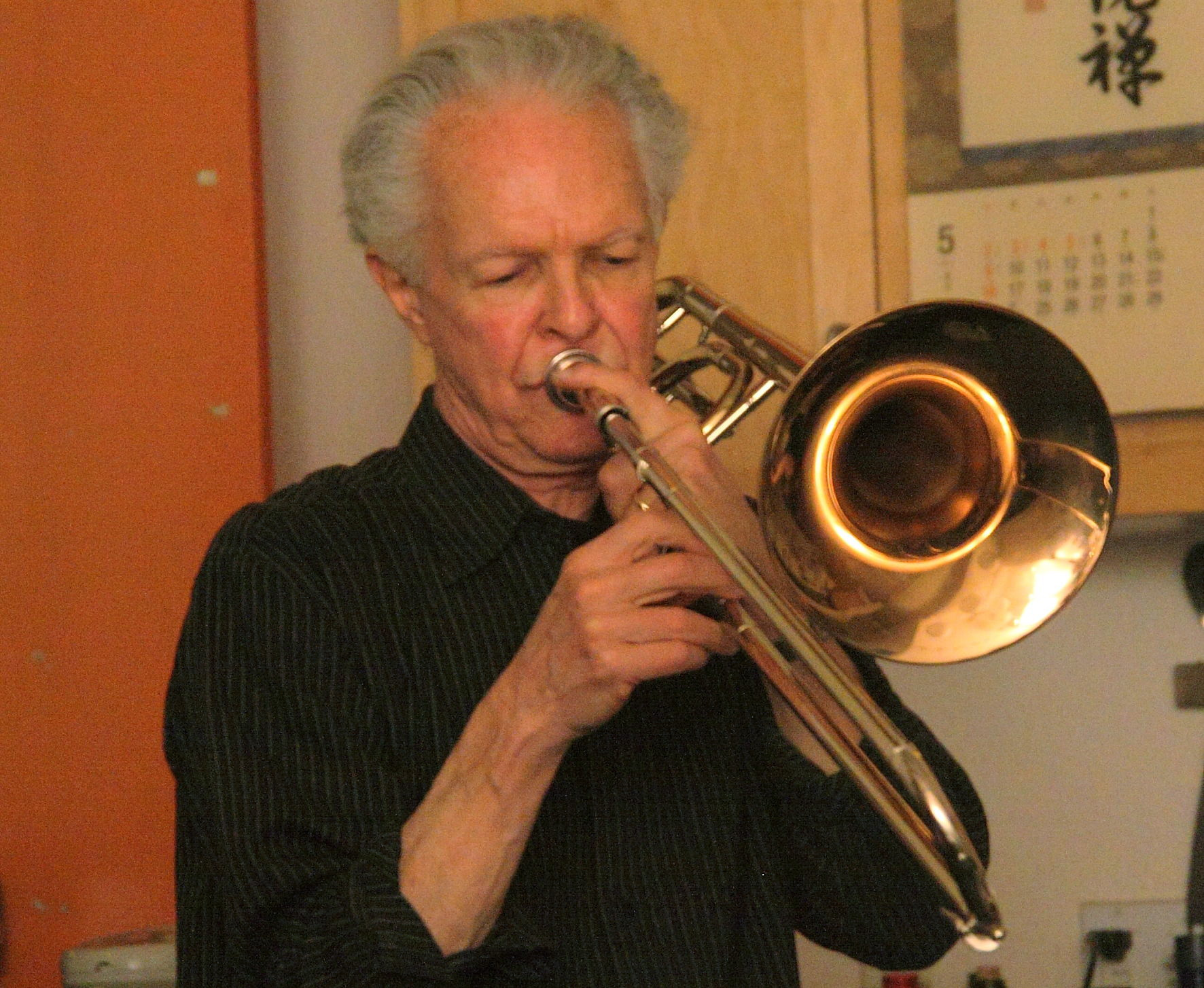
Stuart Dempster in 2010

== Biography ==
After Dempster completed his studies at San Francisco State College, he was appointed assistant professor at the California State College at Hayward, and instructor at the San Francisco Conservatory (1960–66). During this period he was also a member of the Performing Group at Mills College, and from 1962 to 1966 was first trombonist in the Oakland Symphony Orchestra.

In 1967–68, he was a Creative Associate at the State University of New York at Buffalo under Lukas Foss. While there he helped organize the first commercial recording of Terry Riley's In C, in the 1964 premiere of which he had also performed (Schell 2020). The following year he was appointed assistant professor at the University of Washington, in Seattle, where he was promoted to full professor in 1985.

In 1971–72 he was a Fellow at the Center for Advanced Study at the University of Illinois, and in 1973 he was a senior Fulbright scholar to Australia (Tarr 2001; Anon. n.d.). In 1979 the University of California Press published his book, The Modern Trombone: A Definition of Its Idioms. He received a Guggenheim Fellowship award in 1981 (John Simon Guggenheim Memorial Foundation 2015).

He has commissioned and performed works by Luciano Berio, Rob du Bois, Donald Erb, Robert Erickson, Andrew Imbrie, Ernst Krenek, and Robert Suderburg. He has collaborated with former classmate Pauline Oliveros and Panaiotis including co-founding the Deep Listening Band. He commissioned Theater Piece for Trombone Player (1966) from Oliveros and choreographer Elizabeth Harris.

Dempster practices yoga and breath control including circular breathing. (Von Gunden 1983, p. 38) He is credited with introducing the didjeridu to North America. (Ross 2008, p. 66)

== Bibliography ==
- The Modern Trombone: A Definition of Its Idioms. Berkeley and Los Angeles: The University of California Press, 1979. ISBN 0-520-03252-7.

== Discography ==
- In The Great Abbey of Clement VI (1987: New Albion, NA013)
- Robert Suderburg, Chamber Music III ("Night Set"), for trombone and piano (with Robert Suderburg, piano). Also with Suderburg's Chamber Music IV ("Ritual Series"), for percussion ensemble; Chamber music V ("Stevenson"), for voice, string quartet, and tape. Elizabeth Suderburg, soprano; Ciompi String Quartet; University of Michigan Percussion Ensemble, cond. Charles Owen. (1990: Delfcon Recording Society CD, DRS 2127)
- Underground Overlays from the Cistern Chapel, S. Dempster and colleagues (1995: New Albion, NA076)
- Deep Listening, Stuart Dempster, Panaiotis, & Pauline Oliveros (1989: New Albion)
- On the Boards (November 26, 2001 CD NOM11)
- Monoliths and Dimensions
- Lung Tree (2005: ReR Megacorp RDD, LC-02677), Stuart Dempster (trombone, didjeridu, garden hose, et al.), Lesli Dalaba (trumpet), Eric Glick Rieman (modified, prepared, and extended Rhodes electric piano, piano, stomp boxes, MOTM modular synthesizer)
- Echoes of Syros (2009: Full Bleed Music, FBM 003), Stuart Dempster (trombone, didjeridu, conch, garden hose, toys), Tom Heasley (tuba, electronics), Eric Glick Rieman (prepared Rhodes electric piano)
- Mavericks (2015: American Modern Recordings, AMR1041)

With Joe McPhee

- Common Threads (Deep Listening, 1996)

With Greg Powers (as Pran)

- Raga for the Rainy Season (Sparkling Beatnik, 1999) (AAJ Staff 1999)

== See also ==
- List of ambient music artists

== Sources ==
- AAJ Staff (1999). "Pran: Raga For The Rainy Season". All About Jazz.
- Michael Schell. "Stuart Dempster interviewed (April 9, 2020)". Radio Eclectus.
- Anon. (n.d.). "Biographical Information about Stuart Dempster", Stuart Dempster faculty page, University of Washington (accessed 26 April 2016)..
- John Simon Guggenheim Memorial Foundation (2015). "All Fellows: Fellows 301–350 of 799". John Simon Guggenheim Memorial Foundation website (accessed 2 April 2015).
- Ross, John (2008). "Stuart Dempster". Seattle Metropolitan (December): 66.
- Tarr, Edward H. (2001). "Dempster, Stuart (Ross)". The New Grove Dictionary of Music and Musicians, second edition, edited by Stanley Sadie and John Tyrrell. London: Macmillan Publishers.
- Von Gunden, Heidi (1983), The Music of Pauline Oliveros, Metuchen, N.J.: Scarecrow Press, ISBN 0-8108-1600-8
