= Pauline Oliveros =

American composer and musician (1932–2016)

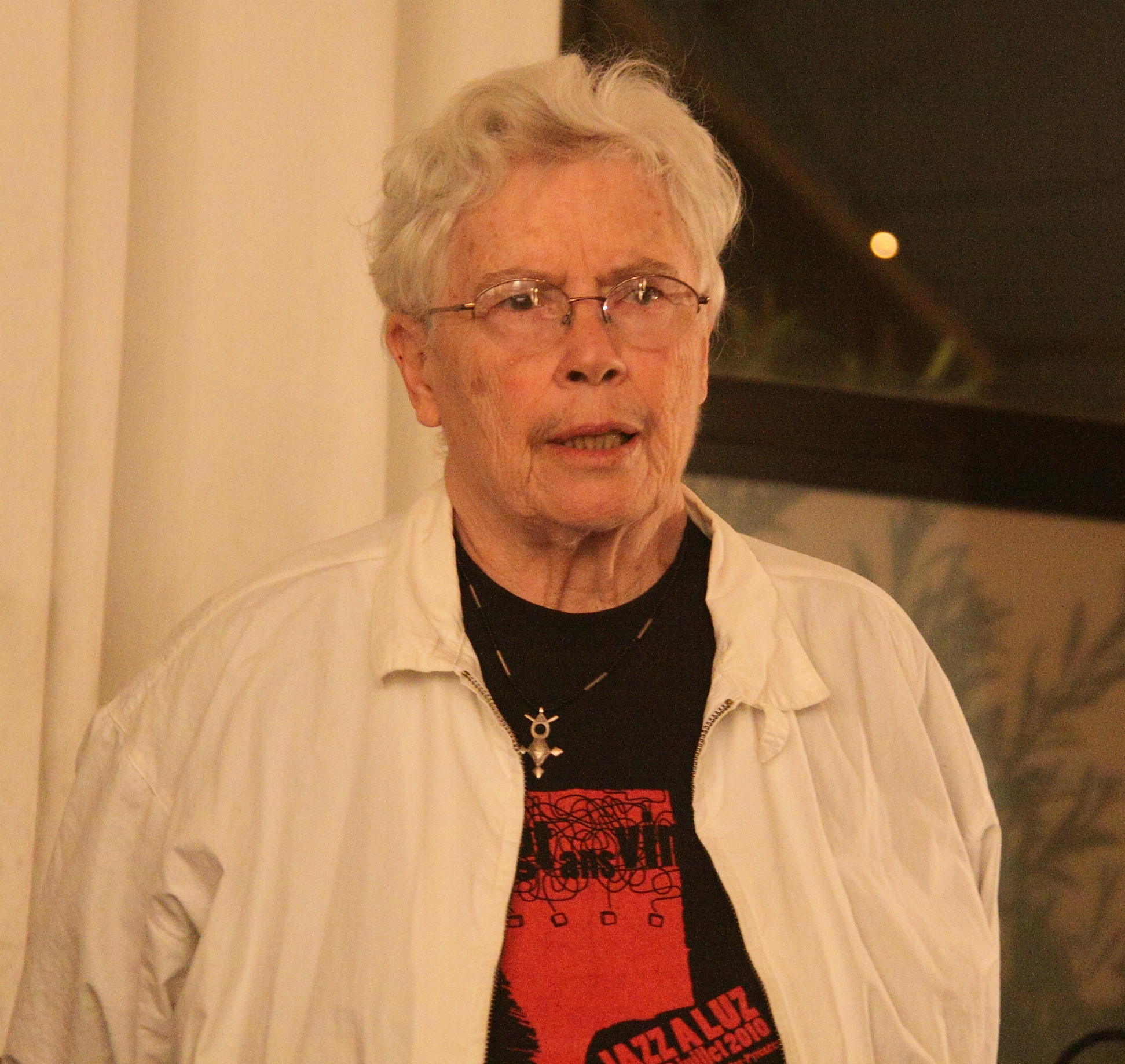
- Oliveros in 2010
- Born: May 30, 1932; Houston, Texas, U.S.
- Died: November 24, 2016 (aged 84); Kingston, New York, U.S.
- Occupations: Composer; accordionist
- Known for: Deep Listening Band
- Spouse: Carole Ione Lewis

Oliveros (on the right) playing in Mexico City in 2006.

Pauline Oliveros (May 30, 1932 – November 24, 2016) was an American composer and accordionist.

Oliveros is considered a central figure in the development of post-war experimental and electronic music. She was a founding member of the San Francisco Tape Music Center in the early 1960s, and served as its director. She taught music at Mills College, the University of California, San Diego (UCSD), Oberlin Conservatory of Music, and Rensselaer Polytechnic Institute. Oliveros authored books, formulated new music theories, and investigated new ways to focus attention on music including her concepts of "deep listening" and "sonic awareness", drawing on metaphors from cybernetics. She was a resident at the Eyebeam technology center.

== Early life and education ==
Pauline Oliveros was born in Houston, Texas, on May 30, 1932. She has been referred to as Tejano but according to her partner Ione she is of Catalan descent. She started to play music as early as kindergarten, and at nine years of age she began to play the accordion, received from her mother, a pianist, because of its popularity at the time. She went on to learn violin, piano, tuba, and French horn for grade school and college music. At the age of sixteen she resolved to become a composer.

Oliveros arrived in California in 1952 and supported herself with a day job, and supplemented this by giving accordion lessons. From there Oliveros went on to attend the University of Houston, studying with Willard A. Palmer. While attending the University of Houston, she was a member of the band program and helped form the Tau chapter of Tau Beta Sigma Honorary Band Sorority.

She earned a BFA in composition from San Francisco State College, where her teachers included composer Robert Erickson, with whom she had private lessons and who mentored her for six to seven years. During this period she met San Francisco-based musicians Terry Riley, Stuart Dempster, and Loren Rush, with whom she would later collaborate.

== Career ==
When Oliveros turned 21, she obtained her first tape recorder, which led to her creating her own electroacoustic pieces. Along with Ramón Sender and Morton Subotnick, Oliveros was one of the original members of the San Francisco Tape Music Center, which was an important resource for electronic music on the west coast of the United States during the 1960s. The Center later moved to Mills College, with Oliveros serving as its first director; there it was renamed the Center for Contemporary Music.

In 1966, she attended a summer course in electronic music at the University of Toronto, studying with Hugh Le Caine. "I of IV", one of her most famous electronic pieces, was realized there; in 1967, it was released on LP by Odyssey Records alongside works by Richard Maxfield (Night Music) and one-time San Francisco Tape Music Center associate Steve Reich (Come Out).

Oliveros often improvised with the Expanded Instrument System, an electronic signal processing system she designed, in her performances and recordings. Oliveros held Honorary Doctorates in Music from the University of Maryland, Baltimore County, Mills College, and De Montfort University.

In 1967, Oliveros left Mills to take a position at the University of California, San Diego. There, Oliveros met theoretical physicist and karate master Lester Ingber, with whom she collaborated in defining the attentional process as applied to music listening. She also studied karate under Ingber, achieving black belt level. In 1973, Oliveros conducted studies at the university's one-year-old Center for Music Experiment; she served as the center's director from 1976 to 1979. In 1981, to escape creative constriction, she left her tenured position at UCSD and relocated to upstate New York to become an independent composer, performer, and consultant.

In 1987, Oliveros had the tuning of her accordion changed from equal temperament to just intonation. She sings and plays the retuned accordion (without electronics) in the 1993 opera Agamemnon.

Oliveros was a member of Avatar Orchestra Metaverse, a global collaboration of composers, artists and musicians that approaches the virtual reality platform Second Life as an instrument itself.

== Deep listening ==
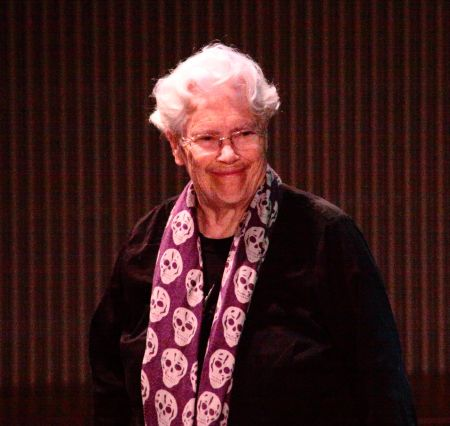
Oliveros at Other Minds 20 in San Francisco in 2015

In 1988, as a result of descending 14 feet (4.3 m) into the Dan Harpole underground cistern in Port Townsend, Washington, to make a recording, Oliveros coined the term "deep listening"—a pun that blossomed into "an aesthetic...designed to inspire both trained and untrained performers to practice the art of listening and responding to environmental conditions in solo and ensemble situations". Stuart Dempster, Oliveros and Panaiotis then formed the Deep Listening Band, and deep listening became a program of the Pauline Oliveros Foundation, founded in 1985. The Deep Listening program includes annual listening retreats in Europe, New Mexico and in upstate New York, as well as apprenticeship and certification programs. The Pauline Oliveros Foundation changed its name to Deep Listening Institute, Ltd., in 2005. The Deep Listening Band, which included Oliveros, David Gamper (1947–2011) and Dempster, specialized in performing and recording in resonant or reverberant spaces such as caves, cathedrals and huge underground cisterns. They have collaborated with Ellen Fullman and her long-string instrument, as well as countless other musicians, dancers and performers. The Center for Deep Listening at Rensselaer Polytechnic Institute in Troy, New York, initially under the direction of Tomie Hahn, is the steward of the former Deep Listening Institute. A celebratory concert was held on March 11, 2015, at the Experimental Media and Performing Arts Center (EMPAC) at Rensselaer Polytechnic.

== Sonic awareness ==
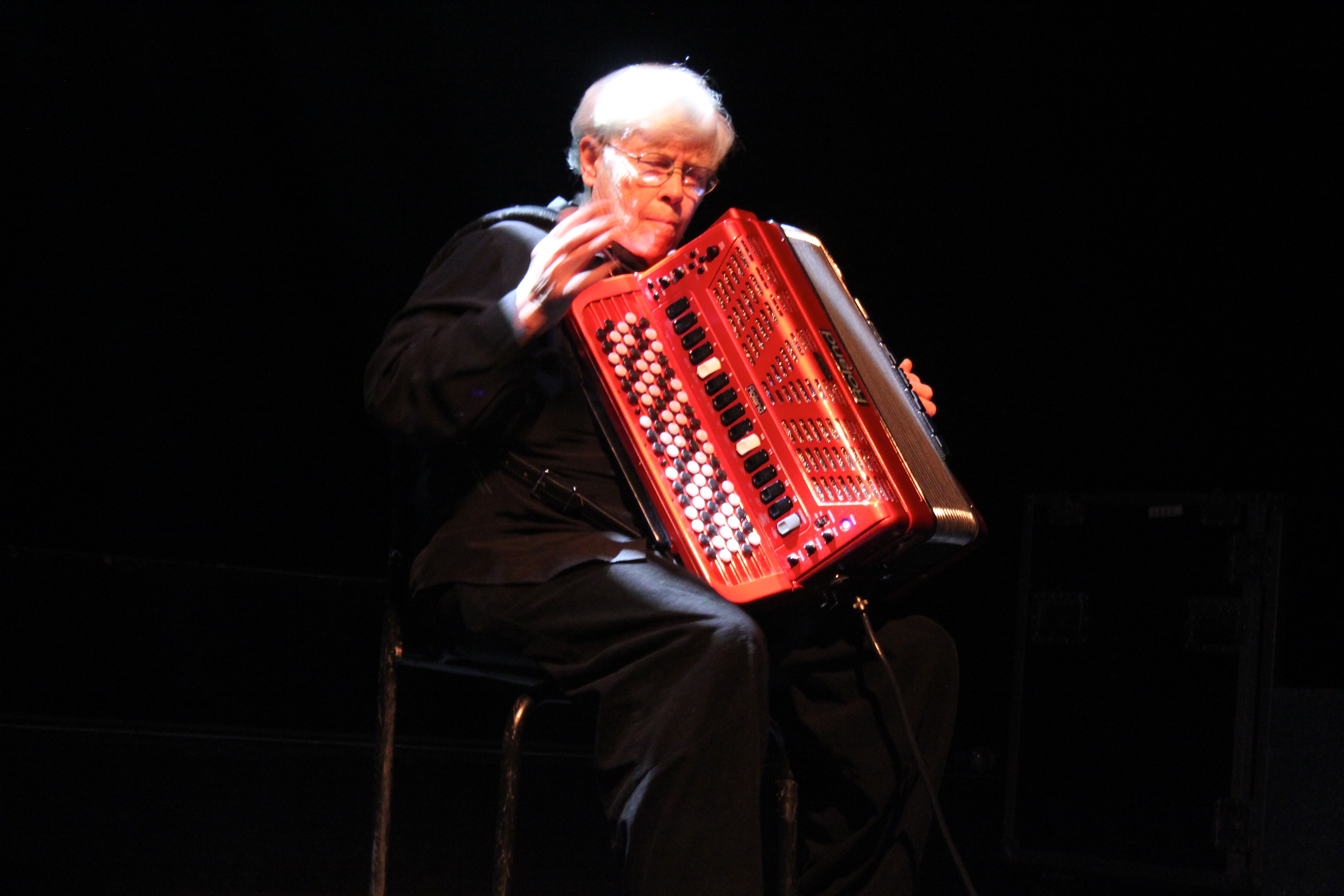
Oliveros at the Sonic Acts festival in 2012

Heidi Von Gunden names a new musical theory developed by Oliveros, "sonic awareness", and describes it as "the ability to consciously focus attention upon environmental and musical sound", requiring "continual alertness and an inclination to be always listening" and which she describes as comparable to John Berger's concept of visual consciousness (as in his Ways of Seeing). Oliveros discusses this theory in the "Introductions" to her Sonic Meditations and in articles. Von Gunden describes sonic awareness as "a synthesis of the psychology of consciousness, the physiology of the martial arts, and the sociology of the feminist movement", and describes two ways of processing information, "attention and awareness", or focal attention and global attention, which may be represented by a dot and circle, respectively, a symbol Oliveros commonly employs in compositions such as Rose Moon (1977) and El Rilicario de los Animales (1979). Later this representation was expanded, with the symbol quartered and the quarters representing "actively making sound", "actually imagining sound", "listening to present sound" and "remembering past sound", with this model used in Sonic Meditations. Practice of the theory creates "complex sound masses possessing a strong tonal center".

== Personal life ==
Oliveros was openly lesbian. In 1975 Oliveros met her eventual partner, performance artist Linda Montano. The titles of Oliveros' pieces Rose Moon and Rose Mountain refer to Montano having gone by Rose Mountain at one time. In her later years, Oliveros developed a 32-year romantic partnership and creative collaboration with sound artist IONE (Carole Lewis). The couple worked together on several major musical theatre productions, dance operas, and films. Sound artist Maria Chavez, a friend and mentee of Pauline, describes Pauline and Ione: "when you saw them together, you saw love."

Oliveros was also a patron of Soundart Radio in Dartington, Devon, England.

== Death ==
Pauline Oliveros died in 2016 in Kingston, New York.

== Awards and honors ==
- 1994 Foundation for Contemporary Arts Grants to Artists award
- 2007, Resounding Vision Award from Nameless Sound
- 2008, Camargo Foundation Fellowship in Cassis, France
- 2009, recipient of the William Schuman Award, from Columbia University School of the Arts
- 2012, John Cage Award from the Foundation for Contemporary Arts
- In 2025, Long Beach Opera dedicated its entire season to the works of Pauline Oliveros, reflecting her growing posthumous influence and recognition as a pioneering composer and innovator in experimental music.

== Notable works ==
- Sonic Meditations: "Teach Yourself to Fly", etc.
- Sound Patterns for mixed chorus (1961), awarded the Gaudeamus International Composers Award in 1962, available on Extended Voices (Odyssey 32 16) 0156 and 20th Century Choral Music (Ars Nova AN-1005)
- I of IV, included in the collection New Sounds in Electronic Music, published by Odyssey Records, 1967
- Music for Annie Sprinkle's The Sluts and Goddesses Video Workshop—Or How To Be A Sex Goddess in 101 Easy Steps (1992)
- Theater of Substitution series (1975–?). Oliveros was photographed as different characters, including a Spanish señora, a polyester-clad suburban housewife, and a professor in robes. Jackson Mac Low played Oliveros at the New York Philharmonic's "A Celebration of Women composers" concert on November 10, 1975, and Oliveros has played Mac Low (see Mac Low's "being Pauline: narrative of a substitution", Big Deal, Fall 1976). (ibid, p. 141)
- Echoes from the Moon (1987) which uses Earth–Moon–Earth communication
- Crone Music (1989)
- "Six for New Time" (1999), for Sonic Youth
- "the Space Between with Matthew Sperry", (2003) 482Music

=== Books ===
- Oliveros, Pauline (2013). Sam Golter and Lawton Hall (ed.). Anthology of Text Scores by Pauline Oliveros 1971–2013. Kingston, New York: Deep Listening Publications. ISBN 9781889471228.
- — (2010). Lawton Hall (ed.). Sounding the Margins: Collected Writings 1992–2009. Kingston, New York: Deep Listening Publications. ISBN 978-1-889471-16-7.
- — (2005). Deep Listening: A Composer's Sound Practice. New York: iUniverse, Inc. ISBN 978-0-595-34365-2.
- — (1998). Roots of the Moment. New York: Drogue Press. ISBN 978-0-9628456-4-2.
- — (1984). Software for People: Collected Writings 1963–80. Baltimore: Printed Editions. ISBN 978-0-914162-59-9.
- — (1982). Initiation Dream. Los Angeles: Astro Artz. ISBN 978-0-937122-07-5.

=== Book chapters ===
She contributed a chapter to Sound Unbound: Sampling Digital Music and Culture (The MIT Press, 2008) edited by Paul D. Miller a.k.a. DJ Spooky.

== Films ==
- 1976 – Music with Roots in the Aether: Opera for Television. Tape 5: Pauline Oliveros. Produced and directed by Robert Ashley. New York: Lovely Music.
- 1993 – The Sensual Nature of Sound: 4 Composers – Laurie Anderson, Tania León, Meredith Monk, Pauline Oliveros. Directed by Michael Blackwood.
- 2001 – Roulette TV: Pauline Oliveros. Roulette Intermedium Inc.
- 2005 – Unyazi of the Bushveld. Directed by Aryan Kaganof. Produced by African Noise Foundation.
- 2020 – Sisters with Transistors. Directed by Lisa Rovner.

== Other works ==
Annie Sprinkle’s 1992 production The Sluts and Goddesses Video Workshop – Or How To Be A Sex Goddess in 101 Easy Steps, which was co-produced and co-directed with videographer Maria Beatty, featured music by Oliveros.

Some of her music was featured in the 2014 French video game NaissanceE.

Oliveros' work Deep Listening Room was featured in the 2014 Whitney Biennial.
