= String harmonic =

String instrument technique

Playing a harmonic on a string. Here, "+7" indicates that the string is held down at the position for raising the pitch by 7 semitones.

Playing a string harmonic (a flageolet) is a string instrument technique that uses the nodes of natural harmonics of a musical string to isolate overtones. Playing string harmonics produces high pitched tones, often compared in timbre to a whistle or flute. Overtones can be isolated "by lightly touching the string with the finger instead of pressing it down" against the fingerboard (without stopping). For some instruments this is a fundamental technique, such as the Chinese guqin, where it is known as fan yin (泛音, lit. "floating sound"), and the Vietnamese đàn bầu.

== Overtones ==
When a string is plucked or bowed normally, the ear hears the fundamental frequency most prominently, but the overall sound is also colored by the presence of various overtones (frequencies greater than the fundamental frequency). The fundamental frequency and its overtones are perceived by the listener as a single note; however, different combinations of overtones give rise to noticeably different overall tones (see timbre). A harmonic overtone has evenly spaced nodes along the string, where the string does not move from its resting position.

== Nodes ==
Table of harmonics, indicating in colors on which positions the same overtones occur

The nodes of natural harmonics are located at the following points along the string, matching the Harmonic series. Harmonic interval names are given from Huygens-Fokker institute list of intervals.

Harmonic	Harmonic interval heard	Frequence ratio reduced to one octave	Closest equal temperament interval	Octave from open string	Cents above open string	Cents reduced to one octave	String length fraction	Audio
2	Octave	1:1	Octave (P8)	+1	1,200.0	0.0	1/2	
3	Just perfect fifth	3:2	Perfect fifth (P5)	+1	1,902.0	702.0	1/3, 2/3	
4	Octave	1:1	Octave (P8)	+2	2,400.0	0.0	1/4, 3/4	
5	Just major third	5:4	Major third (M3)	+2	2,786.3	386.3	1/5, 3/5	
6	Just perfect fifth	3:2	Perfect fifth (P5)	+2	3,102.0	702.0	1/6, 5/6	
7	Harmonic seventh	7:4	Minor seventh (m7)	+2	3,368.8	968.8	1/7 to 6/7	
8	Octave	1:1	Octave (P8)	+3	3,600.0	0.0	1/8, 3/8, 5/8, 7/8	
9	Major whole tone	9:8	Major second (M2)	+3	3,803.9	203.9	1/9, 2/9, 4/9, 5/9, 7/9, 8/9	
10	Just major third	5:4	Major third (M3)	+3	3,986.3	386.3	1/10, 3/10, 7/10, 9/10	
11	Undecimal semi-augmented fourth	11:8	Between perfect fourth (P4) and diminished fifth (♭5, aka tritone)	+3	4,151.3	551.3	1/11 to 10/11	
12	Just perfect fifth	3:2	Perfect fifth (P5)	+3	4,302.0	702.0	1/12, 5/12, 7/12, 11/12	
13	Tridecimal neutral sixth	13:8	Between minor sixth (m6) and major sixth (M6)	+3	4,440.5	840.5	1/13 to 12/13	
14	Harmonic seventh	7:4	Minor seventh (m7)	+3	4,568.8	968.8	1/14, 3/14, 5/14, 9/14, 11/14, 13/14	
15	Classic major seventh	15:8	Major seventh (M7)	+3	4,688.3	1,088.3	1/15, 2/15, 4/15, 7/15, 8/15, 11/15, 13/15, 14/15	
16	Octave	1:1	Octave (P8)	+4	4,800.0	0.0	1/16, 3/16, 5/16, 7/16, 9/16, 11/16, 13/16, 15/16	
17	17th harmonic	17:16	Minor second (m2, aka semitone)	+4	4,905.0	105.0	1/17 to 16/17	
18	Major whole tone	9:8	Major second (M2)	+4	5,003.9	203.9	1/18, 5/18, 7/18, 11/18, 13/18, 17/18	

Above, the length fraction is the point, with respect to the length of the whole string, the string is lightly touched. It is expressed as a fraction n/m, where m is the mode (2 through 18 are given above), and n the node number. The node number for a given mode can be any integer from 1 to m − 1. However, certain nodes of higher harmonics are coincident with nodes of lower harmonics, and the lower sounds overpower the higher ones. For example, mode number 4 can be fingered at nodes 1 and 3; it will occur at node 2 but will not be heard over the stronger first harmonic. Ineffective nodes to finger are not listed above.

The fret number, which shows the position of the node in terms of half tones (or frets on a fretted instrument) then is given by:

$$F = \log_s \frac{m}{m-n}$$

With s equal to the twelfth root of two, notated s because it's the first letter of the word "semitone".

== Artificial harmonics ==
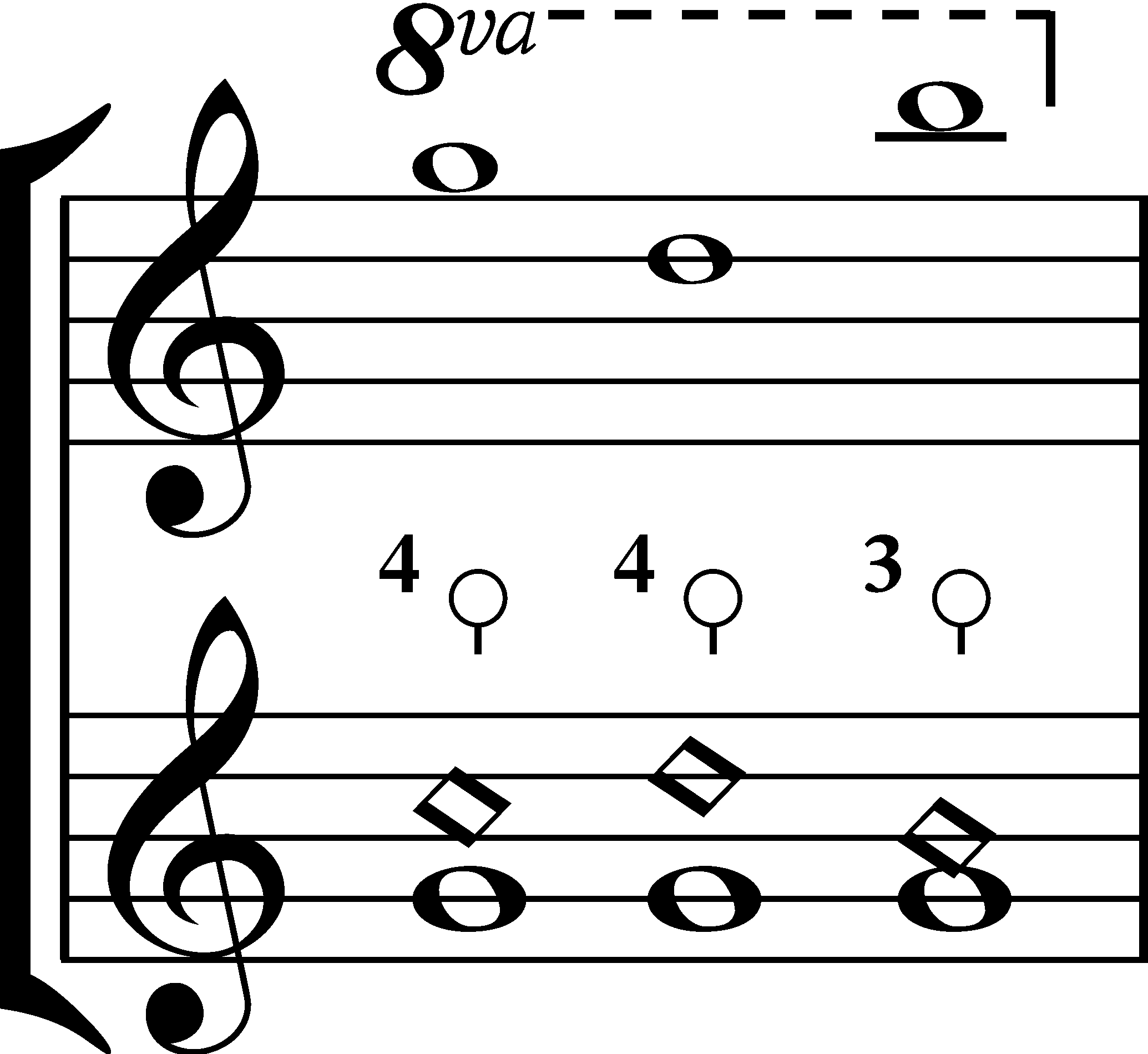
Artificial harmonics on a G fundamental, as written (below) and as sounding (top). The round note (below) is pressed with one finger, and the square note is lightly touched with another one.

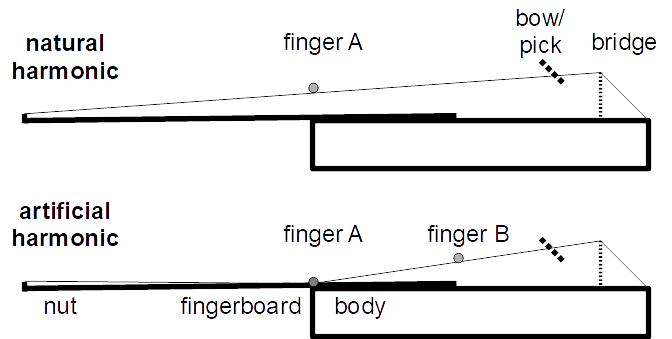
Natural versus artificial harmonic

When a string is only lightly pressed by one finger (that is, isolating overtones of the open string), the resulting harmonics are called natural harmonics. However, when a string is held down on the neck in addition to being lightly pressed on a node, the resulting harmonics are called artificial harmonics. In this case, as the total length of the string is shortened, the fundamental frequency is raised, and the positions of the nodes shift accordingly (that is, by the same number of frets), thereby raising the frequency of the overtone by the same interval as the fundamental frequency.

Artificial harmonics are produced by stopping the string with the first or second finger, and thus making an artificial 'nut,' and then slightly pressing the node with the fourth finger. By this means, harmonics in perfect intonation can be produced in all scales.

— Grove's Dictionary of Music and Musicians (1879)

Artificial harmonics are more difficult to play than natural harmonics, but they are not limited to the overtone series of the open strings, meaning they have much greater flexibility to play chromatic passages. Unlike natural harmonics, they can be played with vibrato.

This technique, like natural harmonics, works by canceling out the fundamental tone and one or more partial tones by deadening their modes of vibration. It is traditionally notated using two or three simultaneous noteheads in one staff: a normal notehead for the position of the firmly held finger, a square notehead for the position of the lightly pressed finger, and sometimes, a small notehead for the resulting pitch.

The most commonly used artificial harmonic, due to its relatively easy and natural fingering, is that in which, "the fourth finger lightly touches the nodal point a perfect fourth above the first finger. (Resulting harmonic sound: two octaves above the first finger or new fundamental.)," followed by the artificial harmonic produced when, "the fourth finger lightly touches the nodal point a perfect fifth above the first finger (Resulting harmonic sound: a twelfth above the first finger or new fundamental.)," and, "the third finger lightly touches the nodal point a major third above the first finger. (Resulting harmonic sound: two octaves and a major third above the first finger or new fundamental.)"

In some cases, especially in the electric guitar technique, it is common to refer to Pinch Harmonics as Artificial Harmonics (AH) and to refer to harmonics produced by other means as Natural Harmonics.

== Guitar ==
The fundamental and the double- and triple-frequency overtones of a guitar string.

There are a few harmonic techniques unique to guitar.

=== Pinch harmonics ===
Pinch harmonics performed on an acoustic guitar

Example of pinch harmonic
Pinch harmonic example on the 3rd fret of the G string

A pinch harmonic (also known as squelch picking, pick harmonic, or squealy) is a guitar technique to achieve artificial harmonics in which the player's thumb or index finger on the picking hand slightly catches the string after it is picked, canceling (silencing) the fundamental frequency of the string, and letting one of the overtones dominate. This results in a high-pitched sound which is particularly discernible on an electrically-amplified guitar as a "squeal". Zakk Wylde (Ozzy Osbourne guitarist) is best known for this sound.

=== Tapped harmonics ===
Tapped harmonics were popularized by Eddie Van Halen. This technique is an extension of the tapping technique. The note is fretted as usual, but instead of striking the string the excitation energy required to sound the note is achieved by tapping at a harmonic nodal point. The tapping finger bounces lightly on and off the fret. The open string technique can be extended to artificial harmonics. For instance, for an octave harmonic (12-fret nodal point) press at the third fret, and tap the fifteenth fret, as 12 + 3 = 15.

=== Flicked and struck harmonics ===
Some players, such as Dimebag Darrell, used a less common technique to play natural harmonics. His variation consists of "flicking the string, dumping the [whammy] bar (...), [making] the string kinda flap, and just tap a harmonic" on the corresponding nodal point before releasing the bar.

Mattias Eklundh has a similar technique, but it does not require flicking the string first. Instead, he uses his middle finger to strike the string on any nodal point, hard enough to make the string ring but without letting the finger press down on the fretboard. The vibrato bar can be used in a similar way Dimebag used it, making it easier to make the harmonics ring, but it is not required. Eklundh also frequently uses such harmonics in combination with normal notes, allowing him to use them in a more musical way.

=== String harmonics driven by a magnetic field ===
This technique is used by effect devices producing a magnetic field that can agitate fundamentals and harmonics of steel strings. There are harmonic mode switches as provided by newer versions of the EBow and by guitars built in sustainers like the Fernandes Sustainer and the Moog Guitar. Harmonics control by harmonic mode switching and by the playing technique is applied by the Guitar Resonator where harmonics can be alternated by changing the string driver position at the fretboard while playing.

== See also ==
- 3rd bridge
