= Multiphonic =

Extended technique on a monophonic musical instrument

A multiphonic is an extended technique on a monophonic musical instrument (one that generally produces only one note at a time) in which several notes are produced at once. This includes wind, reed, and brass instruments, as well as the human voice. Multiphonic-like sounds on string instruments, both bowed and hammered, have also been called multiphonics, for lack of better terminology and scarcity of research.

Multiphonics on wind instruments are primarily a 20th-century technique, though the brass technique of singing while playing has been known since the 18th century and used by composers such as Carl Maria von Weber. Commonly, no more than four notes will be produced at once, though for some chords on some instruments it is possible to get several more.

== Technique ==
=== Woodwind instruments ===
Multiphonic played on an oboe using alternative fingering

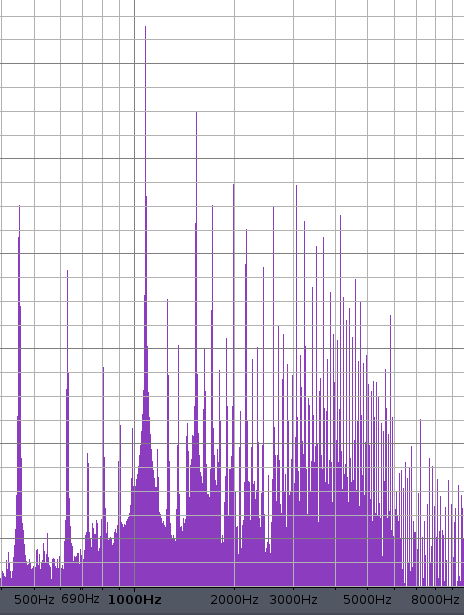
Frequency spectrum of this sound

On woodwind instruments—e.g., saxophone, clarinet, oboe, bassoon, flute, and recorder—multiphonics can be produced either with new fingerings, by using different embouchures, or voicing the throat with conventional fingerings. There have been numerous fingering guides published for the woodwind player to achieve harmonics. Multiphonics on reed instruments can also be produced in the manners described below for brass instruments.

It is said to be impossible to recreate exactly the conditions between one player and the next, due to minute differences in instruments, reeds, embouchure, and other things. This, however, is not entirely true; the multiphonic will depend on the room temperature and other such things, but essentially multiphonics sound the same due to the harmonic structure of the multiphonic. A multiphonic fingering that works for one player may not work for that same player on a different instrument, or a different player on the same instrument, or even after switching reeds. This is often the result of slightly different construction of two instruments from different makers.

=== Brass instruments ===
In brass instruments, the most common method of producing multiphonics is by simultaneously playing the instrument and singing into it. When the sung note has a different frequency than the played note (preferably within the harmonic series of the played note), several new notes that are the sums/differences of the frequencies of the sung note and the played note are produced; leading to the popular term trumpet/trombone/horn growl. This technique is also called "horn chords". The tone sung doesn't necessarily have to be in the played tone's harmonic series, but the effect is more audible if it is. The tone quality of brass multiphonics is influenced strongly by the voice of the player.

Another method is referred to as "lip multiphonics", in which a brass player alters the airflow to blow between partials, in the harmonic series of the slide position/valve. The outcome is just as stable as any multiphonic and perfectly structured. When the frequencies add together or subtract from each other (essentially merge), the fundamental is recreated. For example: A 440 and A 220. This would combine to make 660, creating a new fundamental of the second lowest B of the piano.

A third method, known as 'split tones' or double buzz, produces multiphonics when players make their lips vibrate at different speeds against each other. The most common result is a perfect interval, but the range of intervals produced can vary broadly.

Trombone multiphonics
Demonstration of throat singing on trombone.

=== String instruments ===
String instruments can also produce multiphonic tones when strings are bowed or hammered (as in piano multiphonics) between the harmonic nodes. This works best on larger instruments like double bass and cello. Another technique involves the rotational oscillation mode of the string, which might be twisted to adjust the rotational tension. Other multiphonic extended techniques used are prepared piano, prepared guitar and 3rd bridge.

=== Vocal multiphonics ===
The technique of producing multiphonics with the voice is called overtone singing (typically with secondary resonant structure) or throat singing (typically with additional tones from throat trills).

There is another technique done in whistling, where whistlers hum in their throats while whistling with the front parts of their mouths. This is well known for achieving a spacey "ring modulation" sound (e.g. by Jim Carrey in The Truman Show). All three vibrations—whistle, voice and throat trill—can be combined also.

== How multiphonics work ==
In general, when playing a wind instrument, the tone that comes out consists of the fundamental—the pitch usually identified as the note being played—as well as pitches with frequencies that are integer multiples of the frequency of the fundamental. (Only pure sine wave tones lack these overtones.) Normally, only the fundamental pitch is perceived as being played.

By controlling the air flow through the instrument and the shape of the column (by changing fingering or valve position), a player may produce two distinct tones not part of the same harmonic series.

== Notation ==
Multiphonics may be notated in score in a variety of ways. When exact pitches are specified, one method of notation is simply to indicate a chord, leaving the performer to figure out what techniques are necessary to achieve it. Common on woodwind music is to specify a particular fingering underneath the required note; as different fingerings produce different qualities of sound, a composer who is concerned about the precise effect created may wish to do this. (The same fingering can cause different result on instruments from different manufacturers, due to variations in construction.) Approximate pitches may be specified by wavy lines or in cluster notation to designate acceptable ranges of sound. There is, however, a wide range of notation used to designate multiphonics, with several individual composers preferring notations not in common use. Piano multiphonic notation can include, among other factors, the numbers of sounding partials or fingering distances on the string. Such notations have been developed in recent studies by C. J. Walter and J. Vesikkala.

== Use in literature ==
The first real use of multiphonics in literature are of the brass "horn chord" style. Carl Maria von Weber used this technique in horn compositions, leading up to his well-known Concertino for horn and orchestra of 1815.

Woodwind multiphonics and brass lip multiphonics did not make appearances in classical music until the 20th century, with pioneering compositions such as Luciano Berio's Sequenzas for solo wind instruments and Proporzioni for solo flute by Franco Evangelisti using them extensively in 1958. Multiphonics are widely today used in contemporary classical music.

The technique is used in jazz as early as the 1920s by Adrian Rollini on his bass saxophone. Then it was largely forgotten until Illinois Jacquet used them in the 1940s. Multiphonics were also widely used by John Coltrane, and jazz flautist Jeremy Steig.

== See also ==
- Musical acoustics
- Harmonic series (music)
