= Harmonic spectrum =

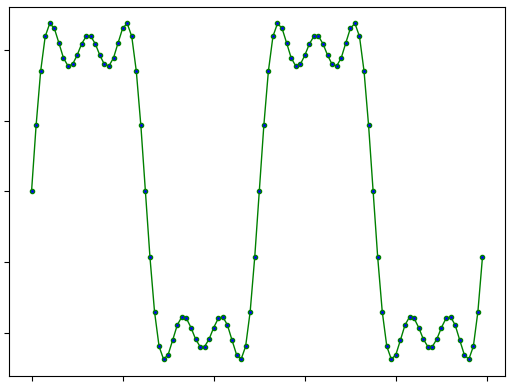
Approximating a square wave by $\sin(t) + \sin(3t)/3 + \sin(5t)/5$

A harmonic spectrum is a spectrum containing only frequency components whose frequencies are whole number multiples of the fundamental frequency; such frequencies are known as harmonics. "The individual partials are not heard separately but are blended together by the ear into a single tone."

In other words, if $\omega$ is the fundamental frequency, then a harmonic spectrum has the form

$$\{\dots, -2\omega, -\omega, 0, \omega, 2\omega, \dots\}.$$

A standard result of Fourier analysis is that a function has a harmonic spectrum if and only if it is periodic.

== See also ==
- Fourier series
- Harmonic series (music)
- Periodic function
- Scale of harmonics
- Undertone series
