= Harmonic scale (disambiguation) =

Harmonic scale may refer to:

- Harmonic Scale
- Harmonic minor scale
- Harmonic major scale

== See also ==
- Scale of harmonics
