= Overtone =

Tone with a frequency higher than the frequency of the reference tone

Vibrational modes of an ideal string, dividing the string length into integer divisions, producing harmonic partials with frequencies f (the fundamental) and its harmonic overtones (2f, 3f, 4f, etc.)

An overtone is any resonant frequency above the fundamental frequency of a sound (or of any oscillation). An overtone may or may not be a harmonic. In other words, overtones are all pitches higher than the lowest pitch within an individual sound; the fundamental is the lowest pitch. While the fundamental is usually heard most prominently, overtones are actually present in any pitch except a true sine wave. The relative volume or amplitude of various overtone partials is one of the key identifying features of timbre, or the individual characteristic of a sound. The human vocal tract is able to produce highly variable amplitudes of the overtones, called formants, which define different vowels.

Using the model of Fourier analysis, the fundamental and the overtones together are called partials. A harmonic partial is a partial whose frequency is an integer multiple of the fundamental (including the fundamental, which is 1 times itself), while the frequency of an inharmonic partial is not an integer multiple of the fundamental. These overlapping terms are variously used when discussing the acoustic behavior of musical instruments. While the n^{th} harmonic may sometimes be called the (n-1)^{th} overtone, ANSI/ASA S1.1-2013 has deprecated the use of the term "overtone" in favor of "harmonic" to reduce ambiguity.

110 Hz tone and its first 15 harmonic overtones: 220 Hz, 330 Hz, 440 Hz, and so on. (listen)

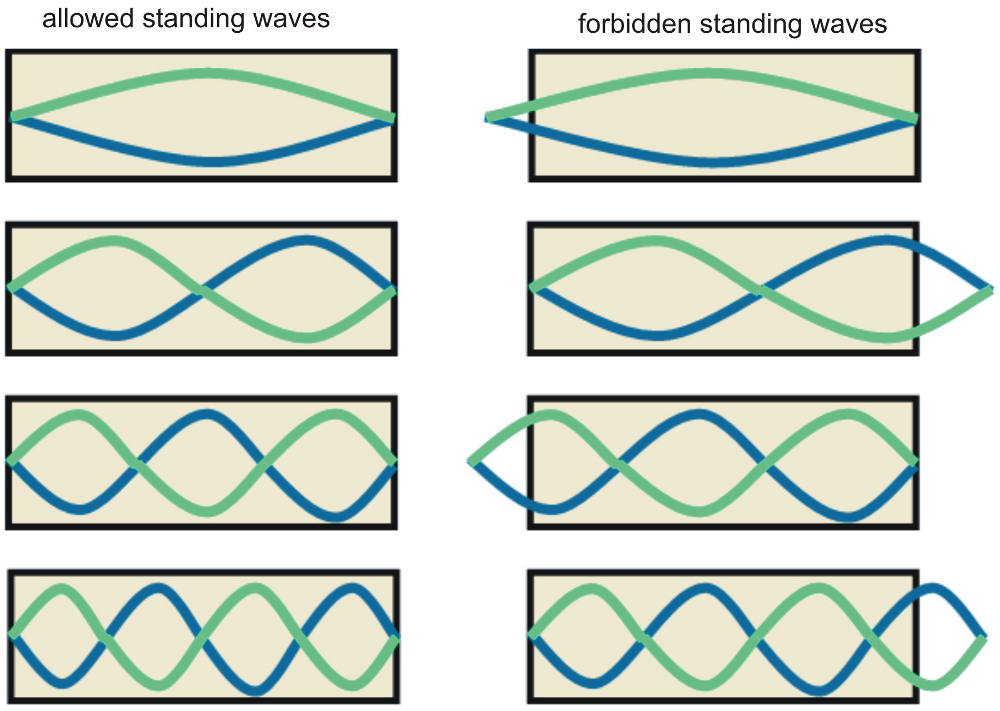
With the boundary condition that a wave's amplitude must be zero at both ends of a rectangle of length $L$, the only allowed sinusoidal standing waves are of wavelength $\lambda_n {=} \tfrac{2L}{n}$, where $n$ is a positive integer.

When a resonant system such as a blown pipe or plucked string is excited, a number of overtones may be produced along with the fundamental tone. In simple cases, such as for most musical instruments, the frequencies of these tones are the same as (or close to) the harmonics. Examples of exceptions include the circular drum, timpano, whose first overtone is about 1.6 times its fundamental resonance frequency, gongs and cymbals, and brass instruments. See Chladni figures for Ernst Chladni's seminal investigation of the vibrational modes of various resonating bodies, including those producing inharmonic partials.

== Explanation ==
Most oscillators, from a plucked guitar string to a flute that is blown, will naturally vibrate at a series of distinct frequencies known as normal modes. The lowest normal mode frequency is known as the fundamental frequency, while the higher frequencies are called overtones. Often, when an oscillator is excited — for example, by plucking a guitar string — it will oscillate at several of its modal frequencies at the same time. So when a note is played, this gives the sensation of hearing other frequencies (overtones) above the lowest frequency (the fundamental).

Timbre is the quality that gives the listener the ability to distinguish between the sound of different instruments. The timbre of an instrument is determined by which overtones it emphasizes. That is to say, the relative volumes of these overtones to each other determines the specific "flavor", "color" or "tone" of sound of that family of instruments. The intensity of each of these overtones is rarely constant for the duration of a note. Over time, different overtones may decay at different rates, causing the relative intensity of each overtone to rise or fall independent of the overall volume of the sound. A carefully trained ear can hear these changes even in a single note. This is why the timbre of a note may be perceived differently when played staccato or legato.

A driven non-linear oscillator, such as the vocal folds, a blown wind instrument, or a bowed violin string (but not a struck guitar string or bell) will oscillate in a periodic, non-sinusoidal manner. This generates the impression of sound at integer multiple frequencies of the fundamental known as harmonics, or more precisely, harmonic partials. For most string instruments and other long and thin instruments such as a bassoon, the first few overtones are quite close to integer multiples of the fundamental frequency, producing an approximation to a harmonic series. Thus, in music, overtones are often called harmonics. Depending upon how the string is plucked or bowed, different overtones can be emphasized. Some instruments only produce odd harmonics, such as the pan flute.

However, some overtones in some instruments may not be of a close integer multiplication of the fundamental frequency, thus causing a small dissonance. "High quality" instruments are usually built in such a manner that their individual notes do not create disharmonious overtones. In fact, the flared end of a brass instrument is not to make the instrument sound louder, but to correct for tube length “end effects” that would otherwise make the overtones significantly different from integer harmonics. This is illustrated by the following:

Consider a guitar string. Its idealized 1st overtone would be exactly twice its fundamental if its length were shortened by ½, perhaps by lightly pressing a guitar string at the 12th fret; however, if a vibrating string is examined, it will be seen that the string does not vibrate flush to the bridge and nut, but it instead has a small “dead length” of string at each end. This dead length actually varies from string to string, being more pronounced with thicker and/or stiffer strings. This means that halving the physical string length does not halve the actual string vibration length, and, hence, the overtones will not be exact multiples of a fundamental frequency. The effect is so pronounced that properly set up guitars will angle the bridge such that the thinner strings will progressively have a length up to few millimeters shorter than the thicker strings. Not doing so would result in inharmonious chords made up of two or more strings. Similar considerations apply to tube instruments.

Some musical instruments, such as the piano, produce overtones that are slightly sharper or flatter than true harmonics. The sharpness or flatness of their overtones is one of the elements that contributes to their sound. Due to phase inconsistencies between the fundamental and the partial harmonic, this also has the effect of making their waveforms not perfectly periodic.

A tuning fork, provided it is sounded with a mallet (or equivalent) that is reasonably soft, has a tone that consists very nearly of the fundamental, alone; it has a sinusoidal waveform. Nevertheless, music consisting of pure sinusoids was found to be unsatisfactory in the early 20th century.

== Etymology ==
In Hermann von Helmholtz's classic "On The Sensations Of Tone" he used the German "obertöne" which was a contraction of "oberpartialtöne", English: "upper partial tone". According to Alexander Ellis (in pages 24–25 of his English translation of Helmholtz), the similarity of German "ober" to English "over" caused a Prof. Tyndall to mistranslate Helmholtz's term, thus creating "overtone". Ellis disparages the term "overtone" for its awkward implications. Because "overtone" makes the upper partials seem like a distinct phenomenon, it leads to the counting problem where the first overtone is the second partial. Also, unlike discussion of "partials", the word "overtone" has connotations that have led people to wonder about the presence of "undertones" (a term sometimes confused with "difference tones" but also used in speculation about a hypothetical "undertone series").

Note that the English translation of Hugo Riemann's 1876 Dictionary of Music gives a definition of klang that says "the second overtone is not the third tone of the series, but the second."

=== "Overtones" in choral music ===
In barbershop music, a style of four-part singing, the word overtone is often used in a related but particular manner. It refers to a psychoacoustic effect in which a listener hears an audible pitch that is higher than, and different from, the fundamentals of the four pitches being sung by the quartet. The barbershop singer's "overtone" is created by the interactions of the upper partial tones in each singer's note (and by sum and difference frequencies created by nonlinear interactions within the ear). Similar effects can be found in other a cappella polyphonic music such as the music of the Republic of Georgia and the Sardinian cantu a tenore. Overtones are naturally highlighted when singing in a particularly resonant space, such as a church; one theory of the development of polyphony in Europe holds that singers of Gregorian chant, originally monophonic, began to hear the overtones of their monophonic song and to imitate these pitches - with the fifth, octave, and major third being the loudest vocal overtones, it is one explanation of the development of the triad and the idea of consonance in music.

The first step in composing choral music with overtone singing is to discover what the singers can be expected to do successfully without extensive practice. The second step is to find a musical context in which those techniques could be effective, not mere special effects. It was initially hypothesized that beginners would be able to:

- glissando through the partials of a given fundamental, ascending or descending, fast, or slow
- use vowels/text for relative pitch gestures on indeterminate partials specifying the given shape without specifying particular partials
- improvise on partials of the given fundamental, ad lib., freely, or in giving style or manner
- find and sustain a particular partial (requires interval recognition)
- by extension, move to an adjacent partial, above or below, and alternate between the two

Singers should not be asked to change the fundamental pitch while overtone singing and changing partials should always be to an adjacent partial. When a particular partial is to be specified, time should be allowed (a beat or so) for the singers to get the harmonics to "speak" and find the correct one.

=== String instruments ===
Playing a harmonic on a string. Here, "+7" indicates that the string is held down at the position for raising the pitch by 7 half notes, that is, at the seventh fret for a fretted instrument.

String instruments can also produce multiphonic tones when strings are divided in two pieces or the sound is somehow distorted. The sitar has sympathetic strings which help to bring out the overtones while one is playing. The overtones are also highly important in the tanpura, the drone instrument in traditional North and South Indian music, in which loose strings tuned at octaves and fifths are plucked and designed to buzz to create sympathetic resonance and highlight the cascading sound of the overtones.

Western string instruments, such as the violin, may be played close to the bridge (a technique called "sul ponticello" or "am Steg") which causes the note to split into overtones while attaining a distinctive glassy, metallic sound. Various techniques of bow pressure may also be used to bring out the overtones, as well as using string nodes to produce natural harmonics. On violin family instruments, overtones can be played with the bow or by plucking. Scores and parts for Western violin family instruments indicate where the performer is to play harmonics. The most well-known technique on a guitar is playing flageolet tones or using distortion effects. The ancient Chinese instrument the guqin contains a scale based on the knotted positions of overtones. The Vietnamese đàn bầu functions on flageolet tones. Other multiphonic extended techniques used are prepared piano, prepared guitar and 3rd bridge.

=== Wind instruments ===
Wind instruments manipulate the overtone series significantly in the normal production of sound, but various playing techniques may be used to produce multiphonics which bring out the overtones of the instrument. On many woodwind instruments, alternate fingerings are used. "Overblowing", or adding intensely exaggerated air pressure, can also cause notes to split into their overtones. In brass instruments, multiphonics may be produced by singing into the instrument while playing a note at the same time, causing the two pitches to interact - if the sung pitch is at specific harmonic intervals with the played pitch, the two sounds will blend and produce additional notes by the phenomenon of sum and difference tones.

Non-western wind instruments also exploit overtones in playing, and some may highlight the overtone sound exceptionally. Instruments like the didgeridoo are highly dependent on the interaction and manipulation of overtones achieved by the performer changing their mouth shape while playing, or singing and playing simultaneously. Likewise, when playing a harmonica or pitch pipe, one may alter the shape of their mouth to amplify specific overtones. Though not a wind instrument, a similar technique is used for playing the jaw harp: the performer amplifies the instrument's overtones by changing the shape, and therefore the resonance, of their vocal tract.

=== Brass instruments ===
Brass instruments originally had no valves, and could only play the notes in the natural overtone, or harmonic series.

Brass instruments still rely heavily on the overtone series to produce notes: the tuba typically has 3-4 valves, the tenor trombone has 7 slide positions, the trumpet has 3 valves, and the French horn typically has 4 valves. Each instrument can play (within their respective ranges) the notes of the overtone series in different keys with each fingering combination (open, 1, 2, 12, 123, etc). The role of each valve or rotor (excluding trombone) is as follows: 1st valve lowers major 2nd, 2nd valve lowers minor 2nd, 3rd valve-lowers minor 3rd, 4th valve-lowers perfect 4th (found on piccolo trumpet, certain euphoniums, and many tubas). The French horn has a trigger key that opens other tubing and is pitched a perfect fourth higher; this allows for greater ease between different registers of the instrument. Valves allow brass instruments to play chromatic notes, as well as notes within the overtone series (open valve = C overtone series, 2nd valve = B overtone series on the C Trumpet) by changing air speed and lip vibrations.

The tuba, trombone, and trumpet play notes within the first few octaves of the overtone series, where the partials are farther apart. The French horn sounds notes in a higher octave of the overtone series, so the partials are closer together and make it more difficult to play the correct pitches and partials.

=== Overtone singing ===
Overtone singing is a traditional form of singing in many parts of the Himalayas and Altay; Tibetans, Mongols and Tuvans are known for their overtone singing. In these contexts it is often referred to as throat singing or khoomei, though it should not be confused with Inuit throat singing, which is produced by different means. There is also the possibility to create the overtone out of fundamental tones without any stress on the throat.

Also, the overtone is very important in singing to take care of vocal tract shaping, to improve color, resonance, and text declamation. During practice overtone singing, it helps the singer to remove unnecessary pressure on the muscle, especially around the throat. So if one can "find" a single overtone, then one will know where the sensation needs to be in order to bring out vocal resonance in general, helping to find the resonance in one's own voice on any vowel and in any register.

== Overtones in music composition ==
The primacy of the triad in Western harmony comes from the first four partials of the overtone series. The eighth through fourteenth partials resemble the equal tempered acoustic scale:

When this scale is rendered as a chord, it is called the lydian dominant thirteenth chord. This chord appears throughout Western music, but is notably used as the basis of jazz harmony, features prominently in the music of Franz Liszt, Claude Debussy, Maurice Ravel, and appears as the Mystic chord in the music of Alexander Scriabin.

Rimsky-Korsakov's voicing of a C major triad, consisting of the fundamental and partials 1, 2, 3, 4, 5, 6, 8, 10, 12, and 16.

Because the overtone series rises infinitely from the fundamental with no periodicity, in Western music the equal temperament scale was designed to create synchronicity between different octaves. This was achieved by de-tuning certain intervals, such as the perfect fifth. A true perfect fifth is 702 cents above the fundamental, but equal temperament flattens it by two cents. The difference is only barely perceptible, and allows both for the illusion of the scale being in-tune with itself across multiple octaves, and for tonalities based on all 12 chromatic notes to sound in-tune.

Western classical composers have also made use of the overtone series through orchestration. In his treatise "Principles of Orchestration," Russian composer Nikolai Rimsky-Korsakov says the overtone series "may serve as a guide to the orchestral arrangement of chords". Rimsky-Korsakov then demonstrates how to voice a C major triad according to the overtone series, using partials 1, 2, 3, 4, 5, 6, 8, 10, 12, and 16.

In the 20th century, exposure to non-Western music and further scientific acoustical discoveries led some Western composers to explore alternate tuning systems. Harry Partch for example designed a tuning system that divides the octave into 43 tones, with each tone based on the overtone series. The music of Ben Johnston uses many different tuning systems, including his String Quartet No. 5 which divides the octave into more than 100 tones.

Spectral music is a genre developed by Gérard Grisey and Tristan Murail in the 1970s and 80s, under the auspices of IRCAM. Broadly, spectral music deals with resonance and acoustics as compositional elements. For example, in Grisey's seminal work Partiels, the composer used a sonogram to analyze the true sonic characteristics of the lowest note on a tenor trombone (E2). The analysis revealed which overtones were most prominent from that sound, and Partiels was then composed around the analysis. Another seminal spectral work is Tristan Murail's Gondwana for orchestra. This work begins with a spectral analysis of a bell, and gradually transforms it into the spectral analysis of a brass instrument. Other spectralists and post-spectralists include Jonathan Harvey, Kaija Saariaho, and Georg Friedrich Haas.

John Luther Adams is known for his extensive use of the overtone series, as well as his tendency to allow musicians to make their own groupings and play at their own pace to alter the sonic experience. For example, his piece Sila: The Breath of the World can be played by 16 to 80 musicians and are separated into their own groups. The piece is set on sixteen "harmonic clouds" that are grounded on the first sixteen overtones of low B-flat. Another example is John Luther Adam's piece Everything That Rises, which grew out of his piece Sila: The Breath of the World. Everything That Rises is a piece for string quartet that has sixteen harmonic clouds that are built off of the fundamental tone (C0)

== See also ==
- Combination tone
- Harmonic
- Just intonation
- Mersenne's laws
- Overtone band (in vibrational spectroscopy)
- Scale of harmonics
- Stretched octave
- Sympathetic resonance
- Undertone series
- Xenharmonic music
