= Split tone =

Multiphonic effect on brass instruments

Split tones are a multiphonic effect on brass instruments. During normal play, the upper and lower lips will vibrate together at the same speed. If, however, the lips are set to vibrate at different speeds, two pitches may be perceived. When not done intentionally, split tones are referred to pejoratively as "double buzzing".

Double Buzz on a B♭ Cornet
First a C is played, then a G is held while a double buzz is introduced at the pitch of the first note

== Notation ==
In Keren by Iannis Xenakis, split tones are notated with two pitches sharing a stem. The lower note is in parentheses. Though the notation is not explained in the score, in another work from 1986, Jalons, Xenakis explains that the two notes should be produced with the lips and not with singing. Throughout Jalons, Xenakis uses split tones extensively in the woodwinds and trombone.

== Usage ==
Split tones can sound similar to a technique called growling, in which additional noise is produced from the throat while playing. The double buzz is distinctly different in that all noise and vibrations are initiated by the embouchure.

Liza Lim makes extensive use of split tones in Ehwaz for trumpet and percussion. In the preface to the score, she states that split tones "tend to be unstable and prone to distortion," and, "it is expected that a degree of fluctuation or 'fraying' will occur in most split tones and this should be regarded as part of the overall timbral quality of the trumpet part."

== Method ==
In a blog post for his Cologne-based ensemble musikFabrik, American trombonist Bruce Collings provided a basic method for producing split tones:

In my experience, the best way to execute a split tone is to aim for the upper note, push the lower jaw a bit forwards and purse the lips a little more than normal. Out of the upper note a second, lower note should come out simultaneously. This note should be the next lower harmonic, so depending upon where you play it, it can be a different interval. F-B♭ in 1st position, F-C in F1 (or 6th position) or F-D♭ in F5 (V) position with the valve.

== Treatment ==
When split tones occur unintentionally, they are referred to as double buzzing. This phenomenon is widely understood to occur due to fatigue. David Hickman writes "In most cases, double buzzes occur because of sore or bruised lips. This causes the player to tilt the mouthpiece unconsciously at an abnormal angle to relieve pressure on the sore area. In these cases rest over several days is the best remedy."

A double buzz results from an uneven balance of pressure between the upper and lower lips. Tilting the horn either up or down will balance the pressure. Others suggest focusing on producing a clear tone on the mouthpiece only. It can be helpful to experiment with the double buzz and learn to produce it on demand. Learning to control it may help in learning to "turn it off" during regular playing.

A completely different approach, favored by pedagogue William Adam and others, is for a student to not pay any attention to the physical aspects of the phenomenon and focus only on producing a clear, focused sound on the instrument.
