= ANSI S1.1-1994 =

ANSI S1.1-1994, published by American National Standards Institute (ANSI), is an American National Standard on Acoustical Terminology. It is superseded by ANSI/ASA S1.1-2013.
