= ANSI/ASA S1.1-2013 =

ANSI/ASA S1.1-2013, published by the American National Standards Institute (ANSI), is the current American National Standard on Acoustical Terminology. ANSI S1.1 was first published in 1960 and has its roots in a 1942 standard published by the American Standards Association, the predecessor of ANSI. It includes the following sections

1. Scope
2. General
3. Levels
4. Oscillation, vibration, and shock
5. Transmission and propagation
6. Transducers and linear systems
7. Acoustical apparatus and instruments
8. Underwater acoustics
9. Sonics and ultrasonic testing
10. Architectural acoustics
11. Physiological and psychological acoustics
12. Musical acoustics
