= Scale of harmonics =

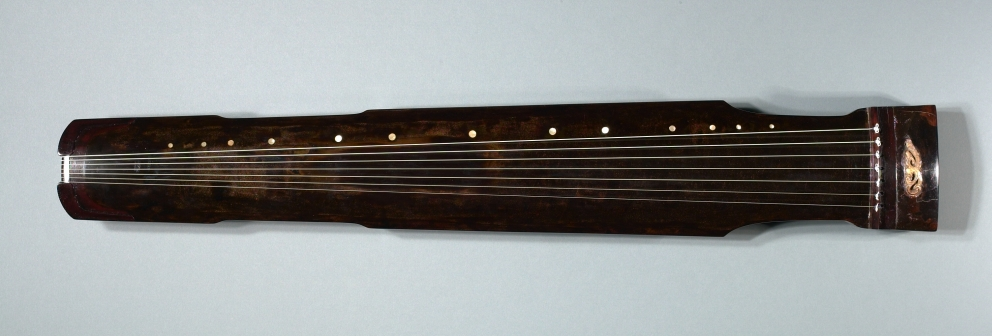
The Guqin

Scale of harmonics on the Moodswinger

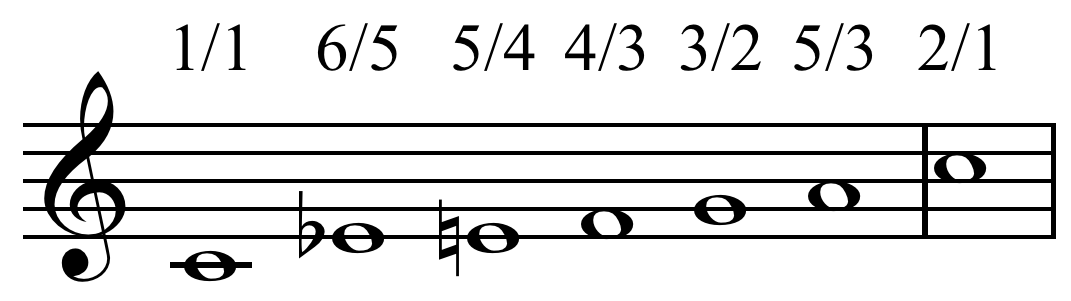
Scale of harmonics on C.

The scale of harmonics is a musical scale based on the noded positions of the natural harmonics existing on a string. This musical scale is present on the guqin, regarded as one of the first string instruments with a musical scale. Most fret positions appearing on Non-Western string instruments (lutes) are equal to positions of this scale. Unexpectedly, these fret positions are actually the corresponding undertones of the overtones from the harmonic series. The distance from the nut to the fret is an integer number lower than the distance from the fret to the bridge (see: superparticular number).

== Origin ==
On the guqin, the left end of the dotted scale is a mirror image of the right end. The instrument is played with flageolet tones (harmonics) as well as pressing the strings on the wood. The flageolets appear on the harmonic positions of the overtone series, therefore these positions are marked as the musical scale of this instrument.

The flageolet positions also represent the harmonic consonant relation of the pressed string part with the open string, similar to the calculations Pythagoras did on his monochord. The guqin has one anomaly in its scale. The guqin scale represents the first six harmonics and the eighth harmonic. The seventh harmonic is left out. However this tone is still consonant related to the open string (otherwise it would not be a harmonic) and has a lesser consonant relation to all other harmonic positions. This is the main reason all the ratios of the sevenths family (7:1, 7:2, 7:3, 7:4, 7:5 and 7:6) also often are not present in other musical scales like for instance the just intoned major and minor scale or the major scale in the Pythagorean tuning.

== Related ==
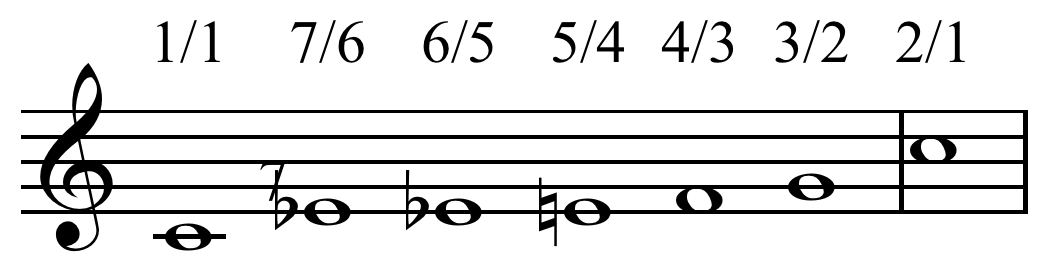
Vietnamese scale of harmonics on c.

A Vietnamese monochord, called the đàn bầu, also functions with the scale of harmonics. On this instrument only the right half (from the view of the musician) of the scale is present up to the limit of the first seven overtones (see 7-limit). The dots are on the string lengths 1/2, 1/3, 1/4, 1/5, 1/6, 1/7 of the whole string length. The reason for this half scale is because the left half creates the same tones as the right half when played as a flageolet tone and therefore the extra dots on the left half are useless for how this instrument is played.

The scale of harmonics was, together with the book of Helmholtz an inspiration for Harry Partch to switch to just intonation and alternate tuning systems to create more consonant music than possible with the equal temperament. Partch's tone selection otonality from his utonality and otonality concept are the complement pitches of the overtones. For instance: the frequency ratio 5:4 is equal to 4/5 of the string length and 4/5 is the complement of 1/5, the position of the fifth harmonic (and the fourth overtone).

The Norwegian composer Eivind Groven also wrote a thesis on the scale of harmonics, claiming this to be the oldest usable scale, frequent in Norwegian folk music, and seemingly in other folk musical traditions as well. Groven used the seljefløyte as basis for his research. The flute uses only the upper harmonic scale.

The scale is also present on the Moodswinger. Although this functions quite differently to a Guqin, oddly enough the scale occurs on this instrument while it is not played in a just intonation tuning but a regular equal temperament.

== See also ==
- Acoustic scale
- Arithmetic progression
- Harmonic spectrum
- Otonality and Utonality
