= Piano maintenance =

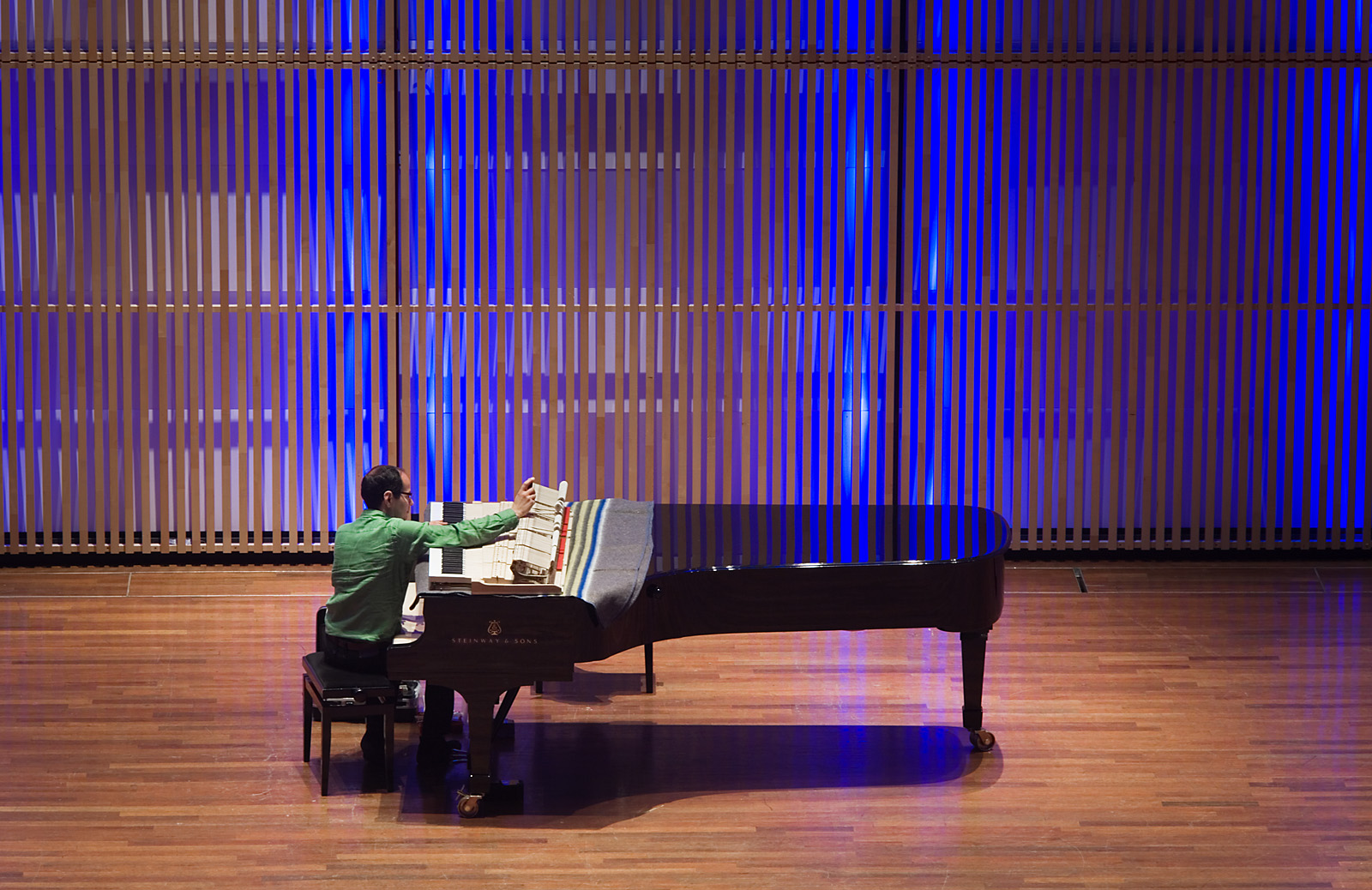
A piano tuner and technician at work

The piano requires various forms of maintenance to produce its best sound. Maintenance is also important for the appearance of the piano.

== Care by technician ==
=== Tuning ===
Pianos that are prized by their owners are tuned regularly, usually once every six months for domestic pianos, and always just before a performance in concert halls. The longer a piano remains out of tune, the more time and effort it will take for a technician to restore it to proper pitch. When a piano is only slightly out of tune, it loses the glowing tonal quality characteristic of a freshly tuned piano, especially because each note in the middle and upper range is sounded by more than one string, and these may get slightly out of tune with each other. Pianos that are more than slightly out of tune tend to be unpleasant to play and listen to, to an extent that varies with the ear of the listener. A tuning hammer and tuning mutes are the main tools of the piano technician. Some tuners use pure aural techniques while others use electronic tuning devices. Formally trained and experienced tuners often find that the use of electronic tuning devices is unnecessary; important elements associated with trained aural tuners are often left out by those relying on electronic tuning devices. These devices often attract the untrained operator in an endeavour to circumvent the need for formal training. and consistent errors have been known to result.

Pianos go out of tune primarily because of changes in humidity. Tuning can be made more secure by installing special equipment to regulate humidity, inside or underneath the piano. There is no evidence that being out-of-tune permanently harms the piano itself. However, a long-term low-humidity/high humidity environment will eventually cause the soundboard to crack, and the keys and other wooden parts to warp.

There are a growing number of musicians and composers who are tuning the piano to non-standard tunings, achieving different kinds of harmony not possible with the standard 12-tone equal temperament tuning (normally found on the piano). Examples of such persons are La Monte Young, Terry Riley, and Michael Harrison – to name a few. Their tunings create never before heard of combinations of intervals (some large and some "micro") that lend themselves to many new harmonies, scales, and textural effects not possible in equal temperament. Of course, these brands of tuning are limited by the internal structure of the instrument itself. One must be very careful because the piano can only hold so much tension before it breaks.

=== Voicing ===
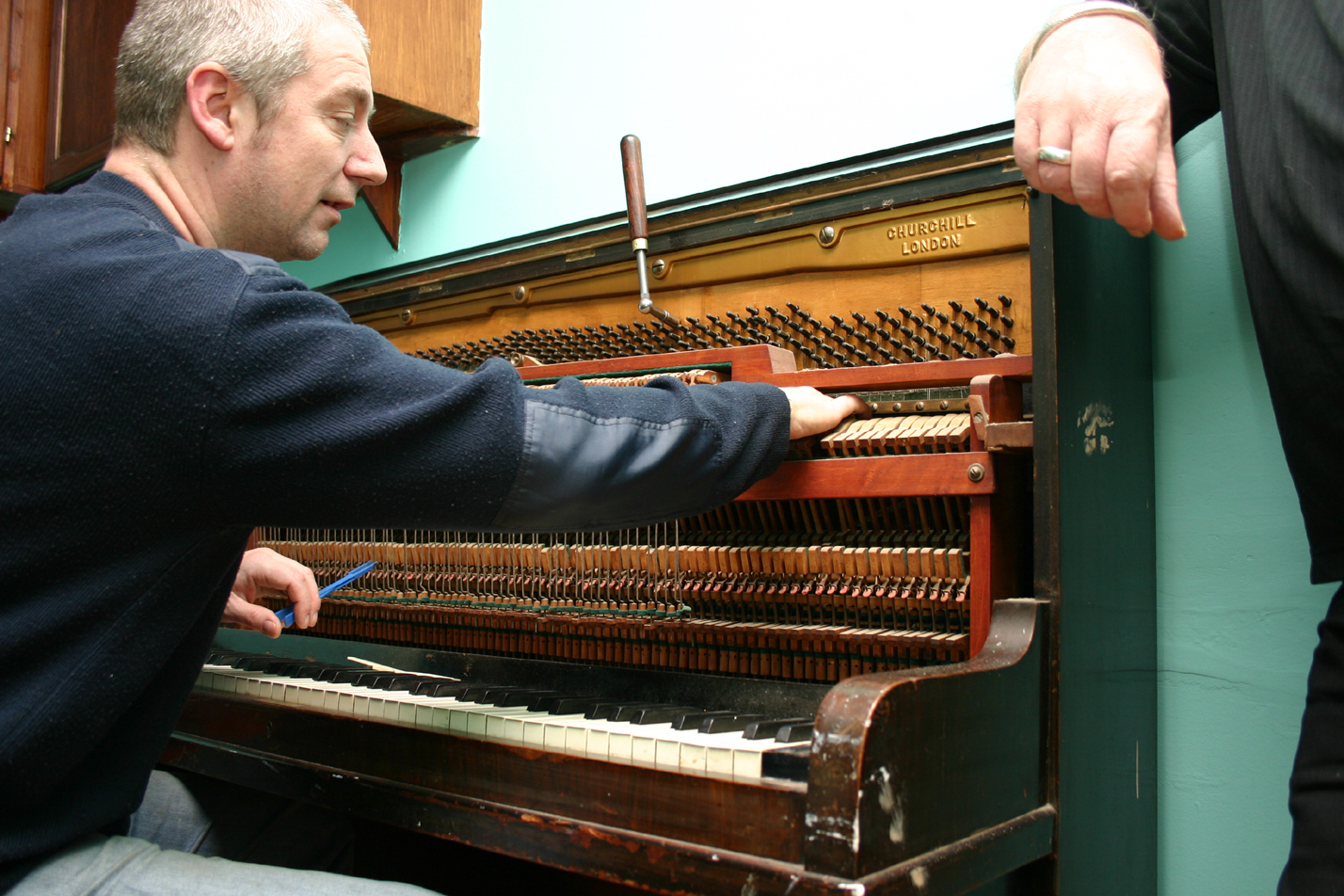
A piano tuner at work

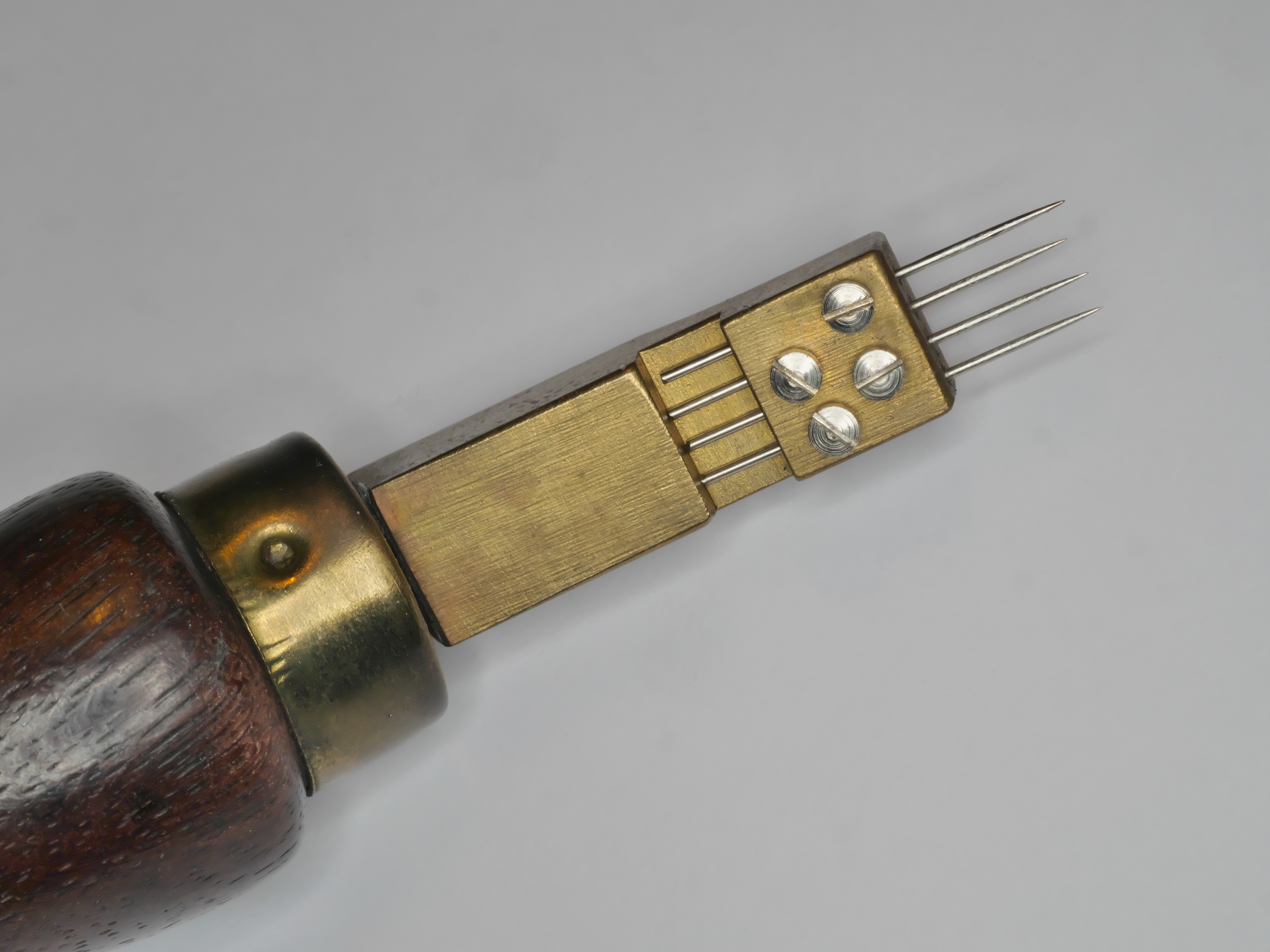
Voicing needle for softening hammers

The felt hammers of the piano tend to harden over time, as the felt becomes compressed by repeated impact. They also form grooves at the points of contact with the strings. Harder hammers produce a brighter tone quality, which may ultimately become harsh and undesirable. Piano technicians can soften hammers using special tools called voicing needles. They also sometimes use special hardening agents when the hammers are too soft (though this practise is controversial among some technicians). In either case, an important goal is uniform tone quality across the piano, since the hammers are not used with equal frequency and therefore tend to wear unevenly. How much and how forcefully the piano is played is a factor in how often a piano is voiced, as are the piano's setting and the preferences of its players.

Over time, the strings will wear grooves into the surface of the hammers. The grooves eventually become deep enough, and the head of the hammer flattened enough, that voicing cannot restore the piano's tone. At this point, a technician can file the hammers, restoring their original ovoid shape and pristine surface at the expense of making them somewhat smaller. This process may repeat several times until there is not enough felt left on the hammers for another filing, and they must be replaced.

=== Regulation ===
Over time, the performance of a piano action tends to decline, due to the compression of felt, warping of wood, and other types of wear. A skilled technician can restore it to optimal precision, in a process called regulation, which involves adjustments ranging from turning a small screw to sanding down a wood surface. Many new pianos are not perfectly regulated when released from the factory, or quickly lose their regulation when moved to their new home, and benefit from regulation in the store or in the home.

The goal of regulation is to make the piano's touch and sound consistent across all notes, allow it to achieve the widest possible range of dynamics comfortably, and make the keys responsive to even the most rapid or most subtle motions of the player.

There are many dozens of types of regulation a piano may require. The most important include adjustment of:

- Let-off, the point when the hammer disengages from the jack and flies freely. If the let-off is too large, it can be very difficult to achieve a pianissimo, to execute rapid trills, and to play powerful fortes; if too small, notes can acquire a "pinched" sound, or even block.
- Drop, how far the hammers fall back after let-off. This affects the responsiveness of the action.
- Repetition springs in a grand piano, which allow a hammer to strike repeatedly with minimal lifting of a key. If a spring is too springy, it can cause double-strikes; if not springy enough, it becomes difficult to repeat a note.
- Key weights (and, in some actions, weight-regulating springs) control the inertia of the keys. A technician can add, remove, or change lead weights in the keys to change how light or heavy the keys feel to the player.

=== Restoration and rebuilding ===
Pianos have a limited lifetime, usually measured in decades. However, different parts have different lifetimes: for example, on a heavily used but well-cared-for instrument (e.g. in a concert hall), the hammers might last less than five years while the soundboard might last fifty years and more. Regular replacement of worn parts can, therefore, extend a piano's lifetime by decades – even indefinitely, provided that the piano's structural support (i.e. the frame) remains sound (and sometimes the frame can also be repaired).

In very used pianos, the frame and some parts of the action may remain in good condition, and piano rebuilders are able to restore or rebuild an instrument by replacing many components. These include the strings, pinblock, bridges, soundboard and ribs, hammers, and action. "Restoration" implies more replacement work than mere "repair" or "maintenance," and "rebuilding" implies yet more intensive work than restoration. However, there is no precise definition of these terms.

Restoration is labor-intensive, and therefore expensive; it is therefore generally done only if the original piano was of high quality, or the instrument has historical or sentimental value.

== Care by owner ==
=== Moving a piano ===
Moving a piano is a difficult procedure. There is risk to the piano, risk of bodily injury to the person moving the piano and other people and risk of damage to other property. Though moving a piano may seem like a simple procedure, there are hidden factors which compound the procedure. Pianos are difficult to move and should only be moved by a professional who is careful, properly trained, insured, and has the proper equipment.

An upright piano is the most popular and simpler to move than a grand piano. It is moved by lifting the piano and sliding a piano movers' dolly underneath or lifting the piano up onto the dolly. The dolly has a sturdy frame for moving and large rubber wheels for ease of moving and not scratching the floor. The piano is transported to its new location and removed from the dolly. The piano should be wrapped or protected with a fitted cover to prevent being scratched or damaged.

The wheels attached directly to the piano itself are rarely used for moving, and are used mainly for cosmetic effect. For a studio piano with larger, double wheels, it is only designed for short moves. When moving a studio piano beyond the immediate room or for more than just a few feet, a dolly should still be used.

A grand piano is moved by covering the piano, fitting the 'skid board' with durable webbing, removing the pedal lyre (since it does not support any weight) followed by the left leg, and gently lowering the piano over onto the straight side. The lid is allowed to overhang the side so as not to pressure it. The piano is blanketed, strapped down and the remaining two legs are removed. Additional care should be added to ensure that the piano parts that can rub together and scratch must be secured. The skid board with the piano is tipped, and a piano movers' dolly is slid underneath for transport to its new location, where the procedure is reversed. Unfortunately, not all carriers fit the 'skid board' at the early stage.

Contrary to popular legend, proper piano moving does not affect tuning. Tuning is affected by changes in humidity. If a piano is properly covered during the move, it will not experience the environmental changes such as going from indoors to outdoors and back indoors again. The piano could go out of tune if exposed to a climate change such as going from a dry home to a humid home.

=== Humidity ===
Much of a piano is made of wood and is therefore extremely sensitive to fluctuations in humidity. The piano's wooden soundboard is designed to have an arch, or crown. The crown increases or decreases with changes of humidity, changing the tension on the strings and throwing the instrument out of tune. Larger fluctuations in humidity can affect regulation, and even cause parts to crack. If humidity changes are extreme, the soundboard can warp so much to the point that it can collapse and lose its crown, which may require rebuilding or replacing the instrument.

Piano owners can prevent these problems by controlling humidity. Most technicians recommend an indoor relative humidity within the range of 30% to 50%, kept as constant as possible. Keeping the piano away from air vents, heaters, open windows, open doors, direct sunlight, and the kitchen can help prevent damage since all these are potential sources of sudden changes in humidity. However, even with these precautions, changes in weather can affect indoor humidity. Ideally, a piano owner would use a hygrometer in conjunction with a humidifier and/or dehumidifier and/or air conditioner/evaporative cooler to keep the humidity of the room housing the piano constant year-round. Baldwin Pianos, a major piano manufacturer, recommends running a small cool-air humidifier at least eight hours a day, preferably during the night or in early morning. While some technicians think that running a warm-air humidifier may be more effective, especially in cases of very dry climates, others think that this may lead to mildew or mold formation inside the crown. In cases where controlling room humidity is impractical, many piano technicians recommend an in-piano humidity control system. Research and technical literature note that stability of humidity is often more important than achieving a specific percentage. Rapid or frequent humidity changes can increase mechanical wear and contribute to long-term structural stress, even when average humidity levels fall within recommended ranges.

=== Contaminants ===
Pianos can be damaged easily by liquids. Liquid spills can not only damage the exterior finish but if a spill reaches inside the piano, it could result in costly damage to the action or soundboard. Piano owners should protect their instruments by keeping liquids as far away from the instrument as possible. Dust in between the keys can interfere with the action but can be reduced by keeping the lid closed when the instrument is not being used, however, the lid should be opened at times to ensure proper air circulation to prevent mold from developing. If a spill occurs, immediate action should be taken by removing the keys, cleaning them in a grease-cutting solution and allowing them to dry. Disassembly and reassembly should be done carefully if undertaken by anyone other than a technician.

=== Appearance ===
Pianos are pieces of fine furniture, and in this role, they benefit from cleaning and polishing, done carefully to avoid introduction of any fluids into the piano's interior. For many piano finishes, dust is better removed with a feather duster or a vacuum cleaner rather than a cloth, to minimize the abrasive effect of the dust. A piano technician should be consulted for recommendations on cleaning and polishing products suitable for a piano.

== See also ==
- Registered Piano Technician
- Piano Technicians Guild
