= Tuning mechanisms for stringed instruments =

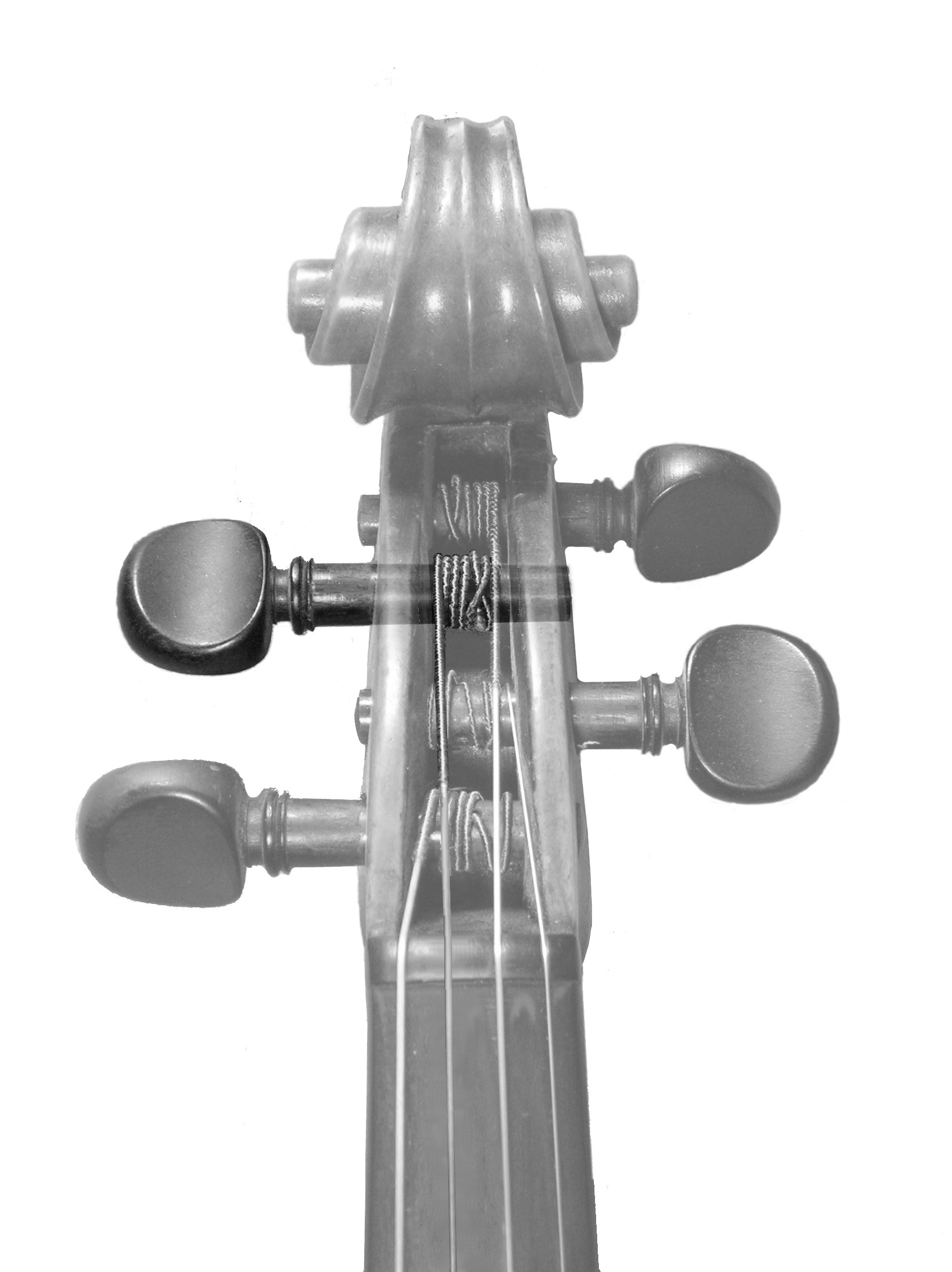
Violin pegbox, retouched image

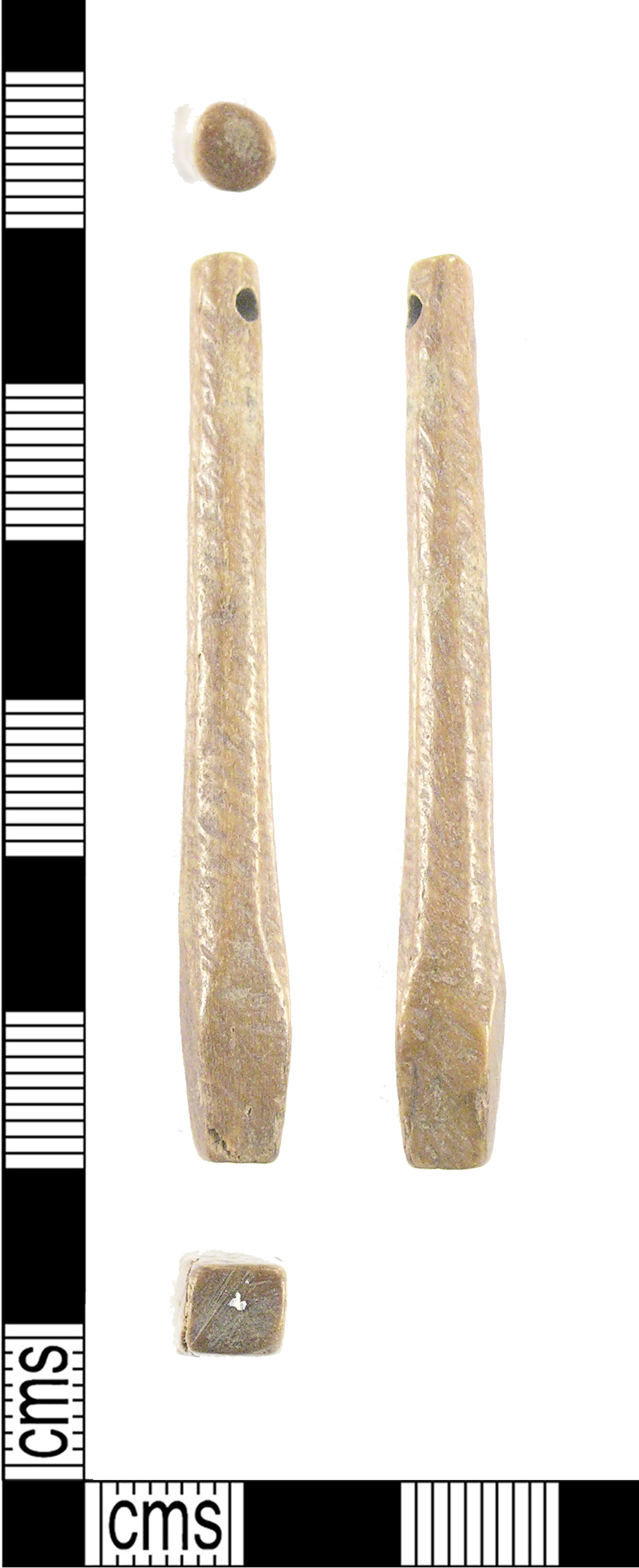
Medieval bone tuning pin. One end is pierced for the string; the other is squared off to fit in a tuning lever socket. The middle section, which would pass through the wood, is tapered.

A variety of methods are used to tune different stringed instruments. Most change the pitch produced when the string is played by adjusting the tension of the strings.

A tuning peg in a pegbox is perhaps the most common system. A peg has a grip or knob on it to allow it to be turned. A tuning pin is a tuning peg with a detachable grip, called a tuning lever. The socket on the tuning lever fits over the pin and allows it to be turned. Tuning pins are used on instruments where there is no space for a knob on each string, such as pianos and harps.

Turning the peg or pin tightens or loosens the string. Some tuning pegs and pins are tapered, some threaded. Some tuning pegs are ornamented with shell, metal, or plastic inlays, beads (pips) or rings.

Other tuning systems include screw-and-lever tuners, geared tuners, and the konso friction tuning system (using braided leather rings).

== Pegbox or headstock ==
A pegbox is the part of certain stringed musical instruments (the violin family: violin, viola, cello, double bass) that houses the tuning pegs. The corresponding part of the lute family (including guitar, mandolin, banjo, ukulele) is called the headstock.

== Tapered pegs and pins ==
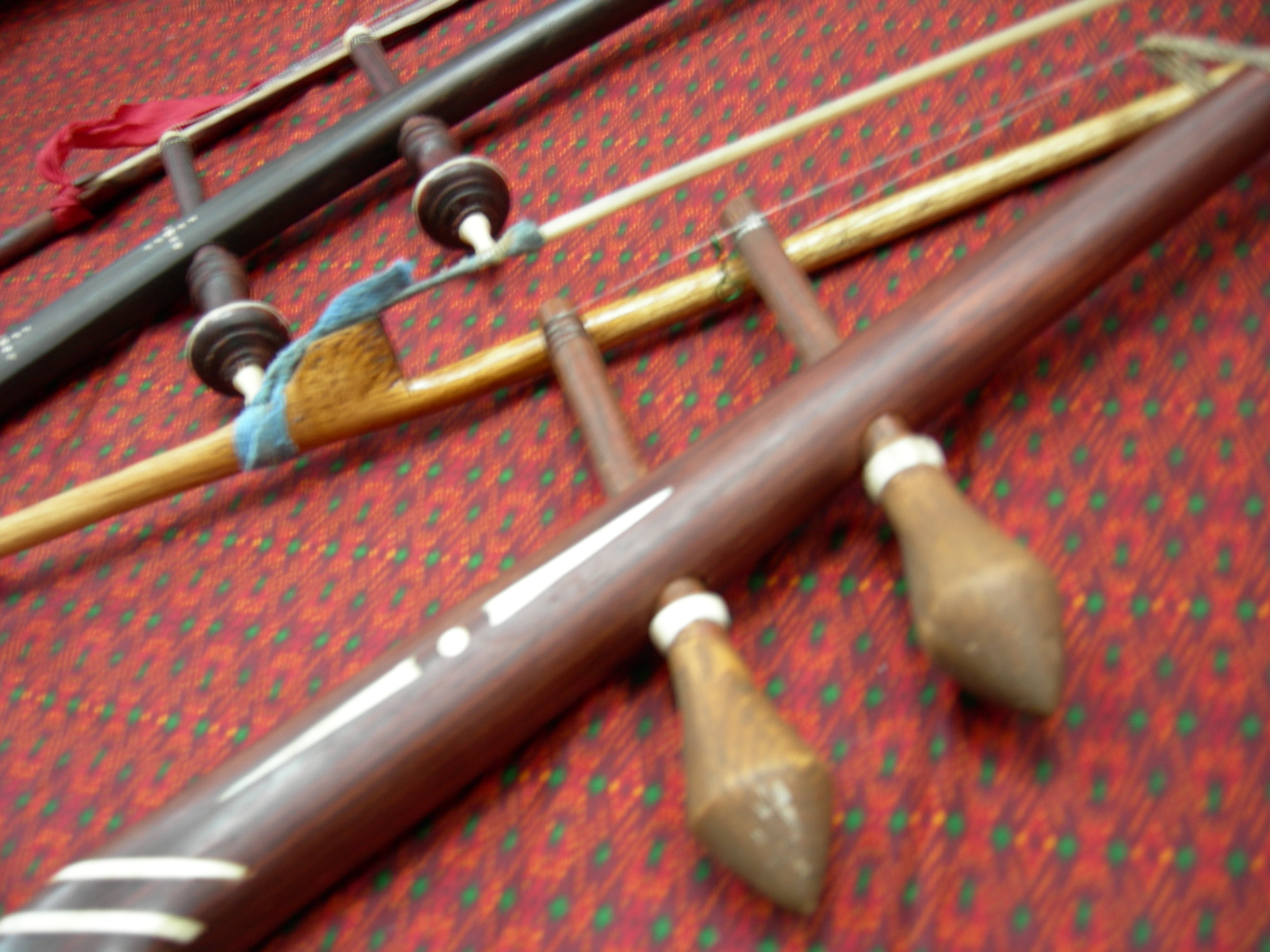
Tuning pegs on a tro

A tapered peg is simply a smooth peg with a string wound around it. The tension of the string is controlled by turning the peg, and the peg is held in place by friction in its hole (in contrast to tuning machines, below).

A properly working peg will turn easily and hold reliably, that is, it will neither stick nor slip. Modern pegs for violin and viola have conical shafts, turned to a 1:30 taper, changing in diameter by 1 mm over a distance of 30 mm. Modern cello pegs have a slightly more aggressive 1:25 taper. 19th century and earlier pegs, for use with stretchier gut strings, typically had an even steeper taper of 1:20.

The taper allows the peg to turn more easily when pulled out slightly, and to hold firmly when pushed in while being turned. Since the typical wear pattern on a peg shaft interferes with this action, pegs occasionally require refitting, a specialized job which amounts to reshaping both pegs and holes to a smooth circular conical taper.

Tapered tuning pins are similar, but must be turned with a tuning tool, usually called a tuning key, tuning lever, or tuning wrench. Historically, pins were also tapered (see image of bone peg, right), but they are now generally threaded, instead (see below).

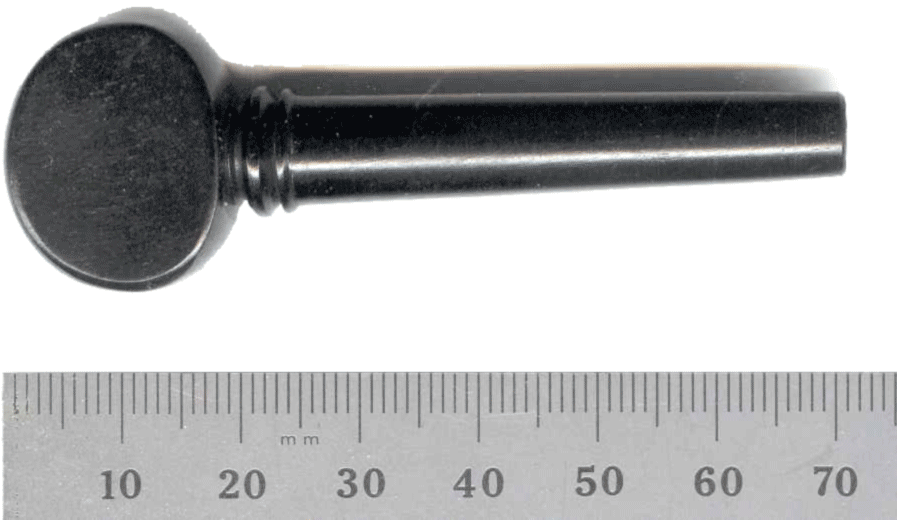
A modern violin tuning peg, not yet shaved to fit an instrument. Note smooth taper and finger grip.

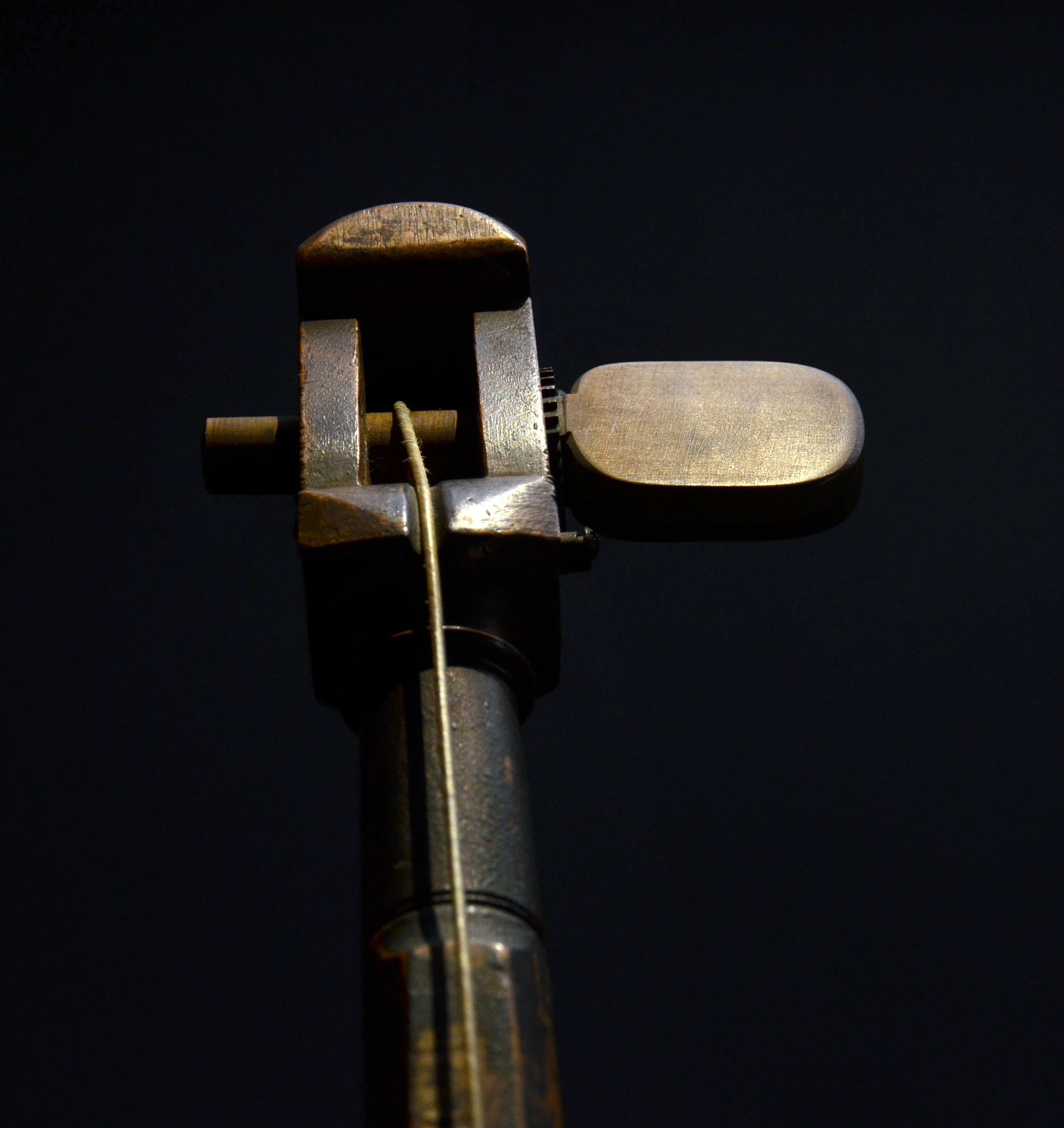
The single tuning peg of a tromba marina, turned by hand

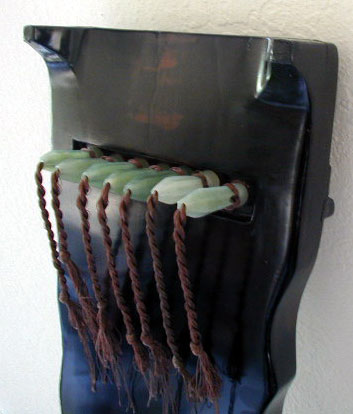
Ornate jade tuning pins on a guqin

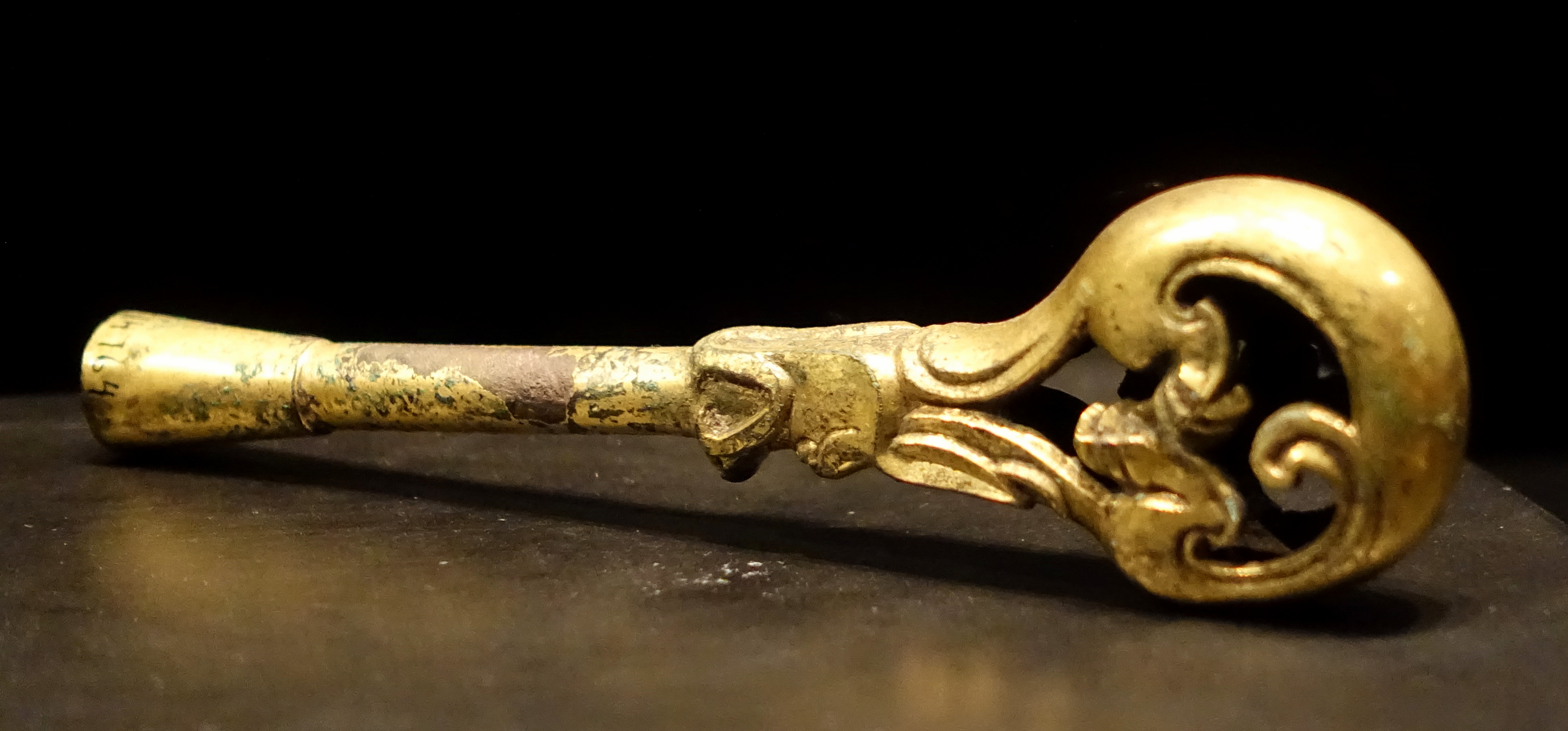
Gilded bronze tuning key for turning the pins of a guqin, China, Han dynasty, 201 BC to 221 AD.

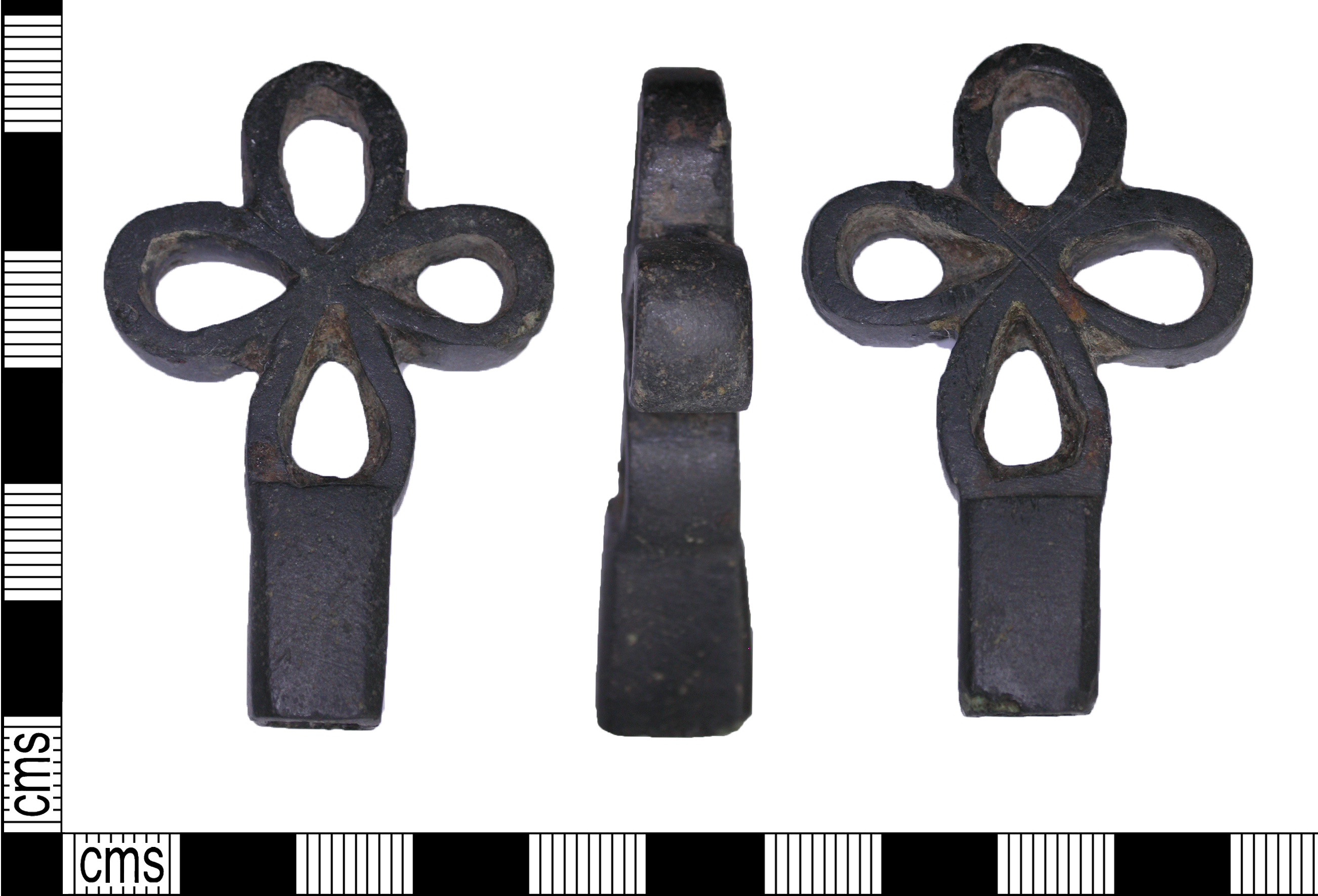
A medieval tuning key with a square socket, for turning tuning pins. Excavated in Nottinghamshire, Great Britain.

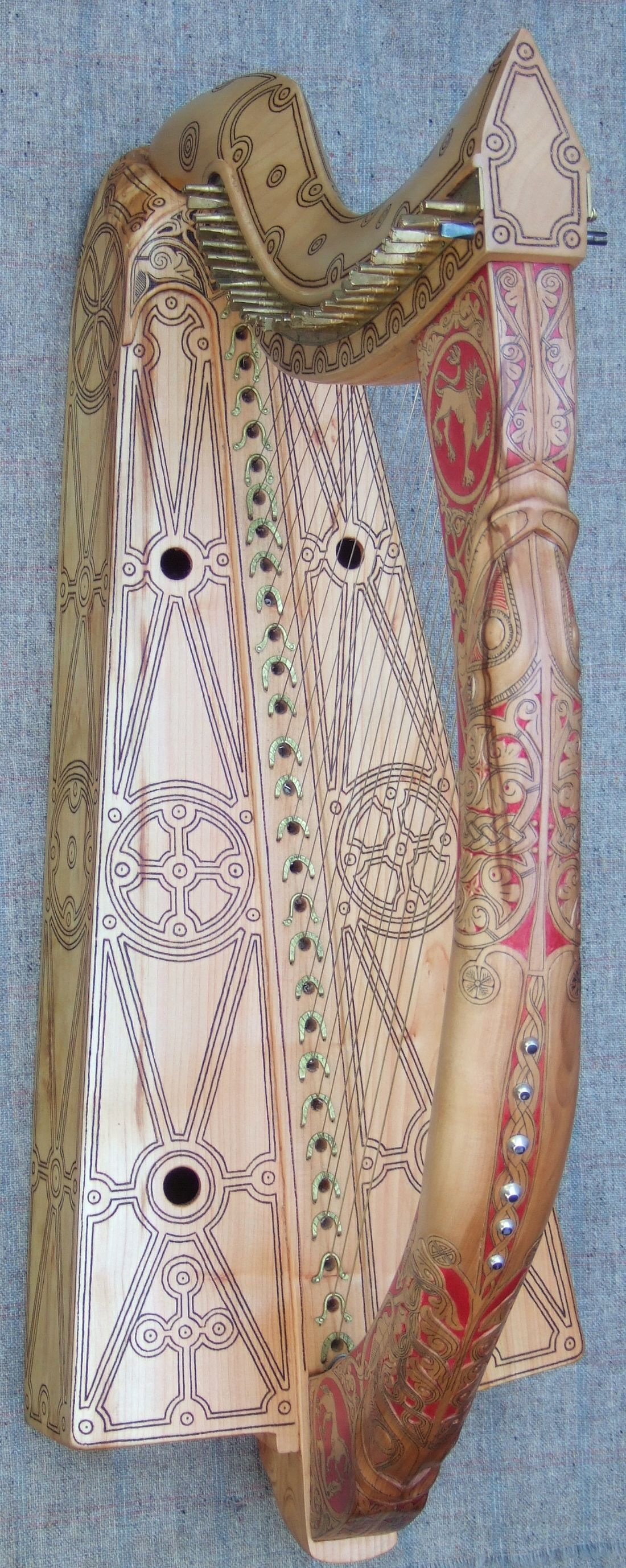
Brass tuning pins on a replica of the late medieval Queen Mary Harp.

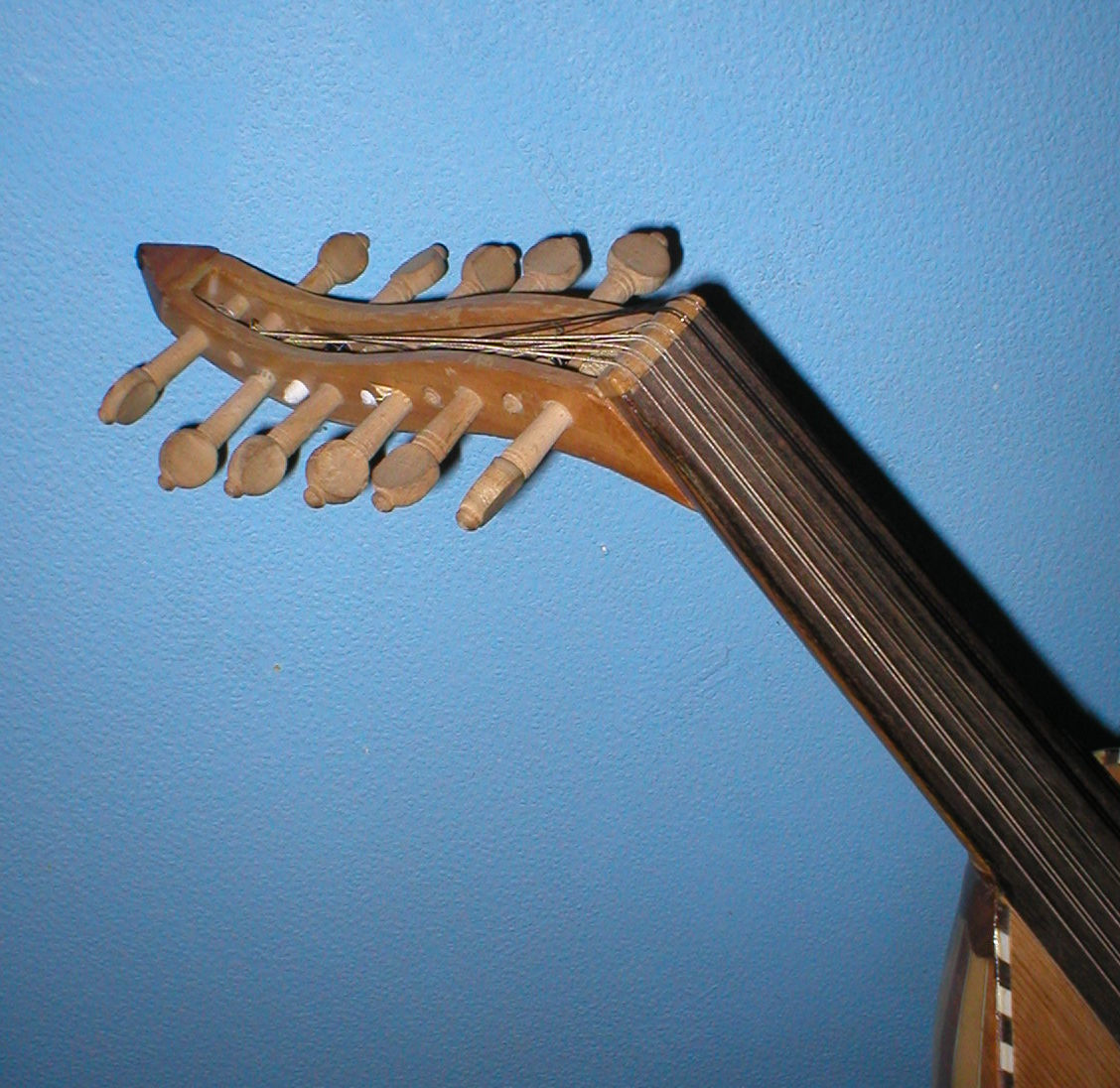
pegbox and pegs of an oud.

=== Use ===
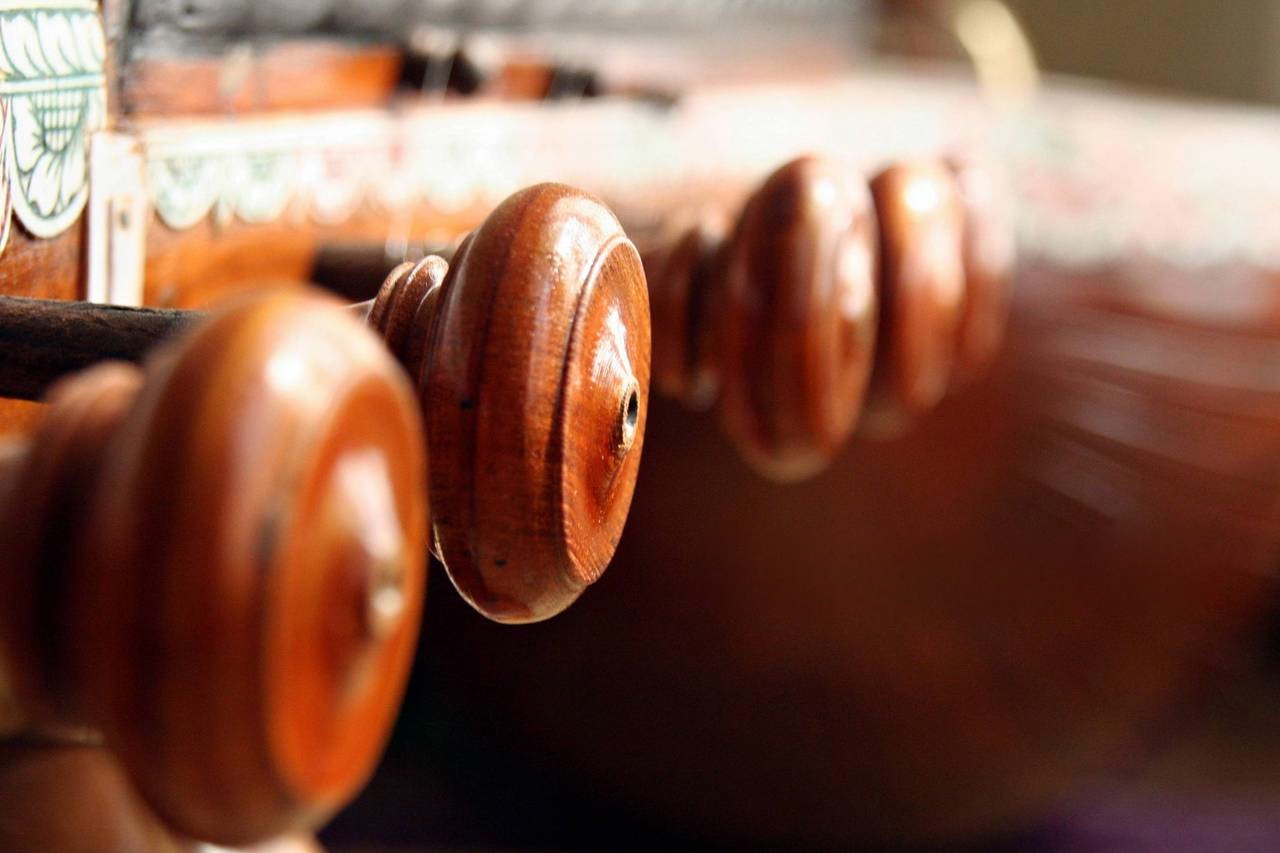
Tuning pegs with knobs on a veena.

Tapered pegs are a simple, ancient design, common in many musical traditions.

Tapered pegs are common on classical Indian instruments such as the sitar, the Saraswati veena, and the sarod, but some like the esraj and Mohan veena often use modern tuning machines instead. Tapered pegs are also used on older European instruments, such as the Bulgarian gadulka and the hurdy-gurdy, as well as on flamenco guitars.

Among modern Western musical instruments, tapered pegs are most often used on violin family instruments, though usually the double bass uses tuning machines.

=== Peg dope ===
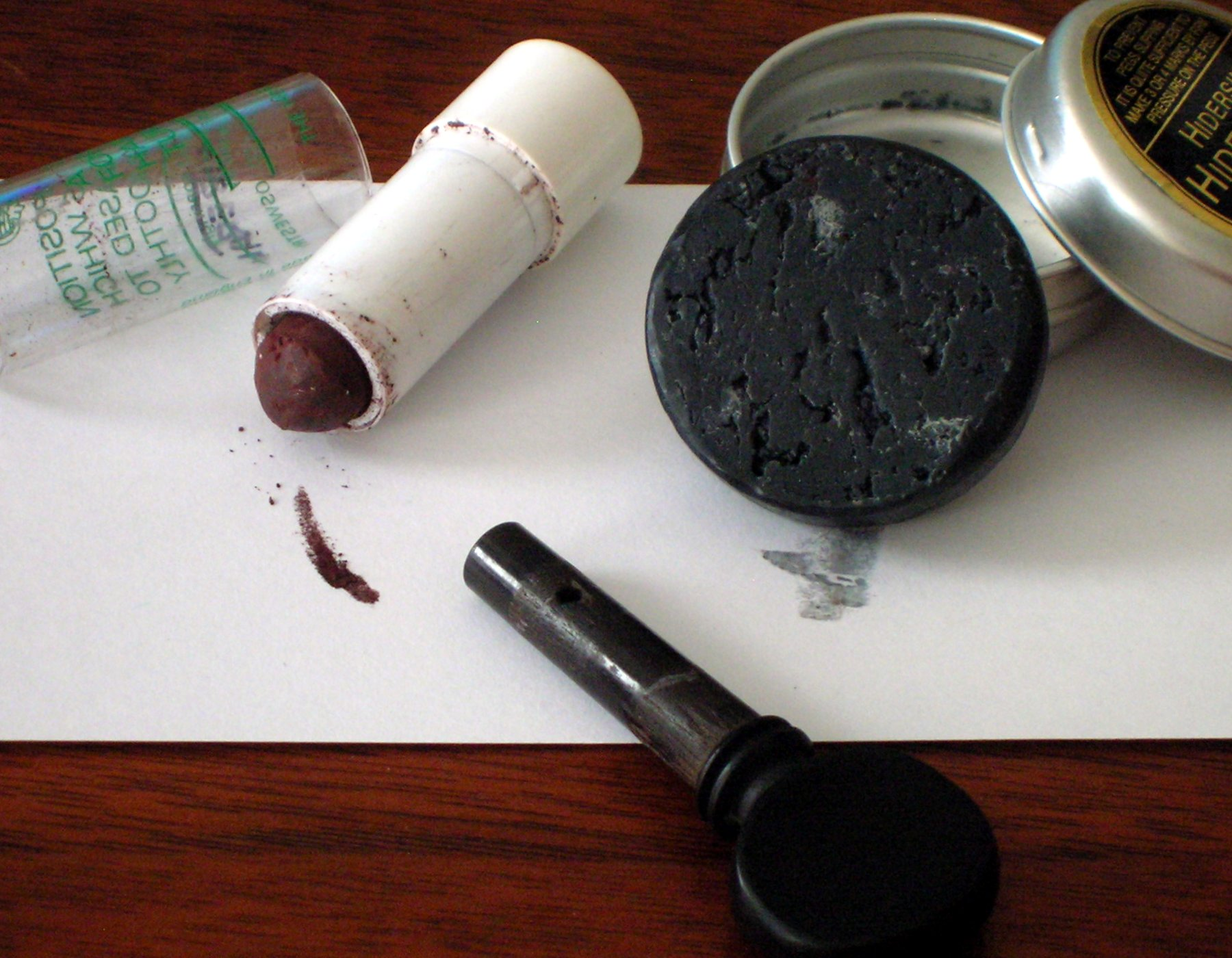
Two types of compound; bearing surfaces of peg are visible as shiny bands

"Peg dope" (also peg paste, peg stick, peg compound) is a substance used to coat the bearing surfaces of the tapered tuning pegs of string instruments (mainly violins, violas, cellos, viols and lutes ). Manufactured varieties are generally sold in either a small stick (resembling lipstick), a block, or as a liquid in a bottle. Commonly used home expedient treatments may include soap, graphite, or talc.

Peg dope serves two different (and almost conflicting) purposes. It both lubricates the peg shaft so it turns easily in the pegbox and provides friction to keep the pegs from slipping with the force of string tension. Tuning pegs that are well fitted and properly doped will both turn smoothly throughout an entire rotation and hold firmly wherever the player wishes.

Without the proper amount of friction to hold the peg in place, a tapered tuning peg will tend to "slip", making a tuning setting virtually impossible to maintain. String instruments with pegs that are slipping can be tuned briefly, but will be out of tune within minutes as soon as the peg slips again. With too much friction, adjusting the tuning at all is impossible. If the pegs or their holes are not perfectly round, or if the bearing surfaces of the pegs are indented from wear, peg dope will not remedy the resulting problems.

== Threaded pegs and pins ==
Some pegs and pins are threaded with a shallow, fine thread. They are not tapered, but straight, and they go into straight-sided holes.

Like tapered pins, threaded pins must be set in a pin block of fairly hard wood, such as cherry or white oak, or they will not stay in tune well. Some pin block woods come from endangered species. Some specialized plywoods can also be used (piano pin block stock or the die maker's ply used for rotary dies).

Threaded tuners are durable, will take very high string tensions. They do not push outwards on the hole and wedge the wood apart, which can reduce the risk of splitting it. They can be set in blind holes, which allows the wood to retain more strength for a given weight. They can, however, also be set in holes drilled right through the wood, to look like older pins. Threaded pins can be installed with an arbor press, and do not need to be re-set, but should be backed off a few turns when changing a string to keep pin height even.

=== Use ===
Tuning pins may be known as wrest pins or zither pins, regardless of the instrument on which they are used. They are used on instruments with many close strings, as they are more compact and cheaper. Modern pianos use threaded pins, as do many harps, psaltries, dulcimers, zithers, and other instruments.

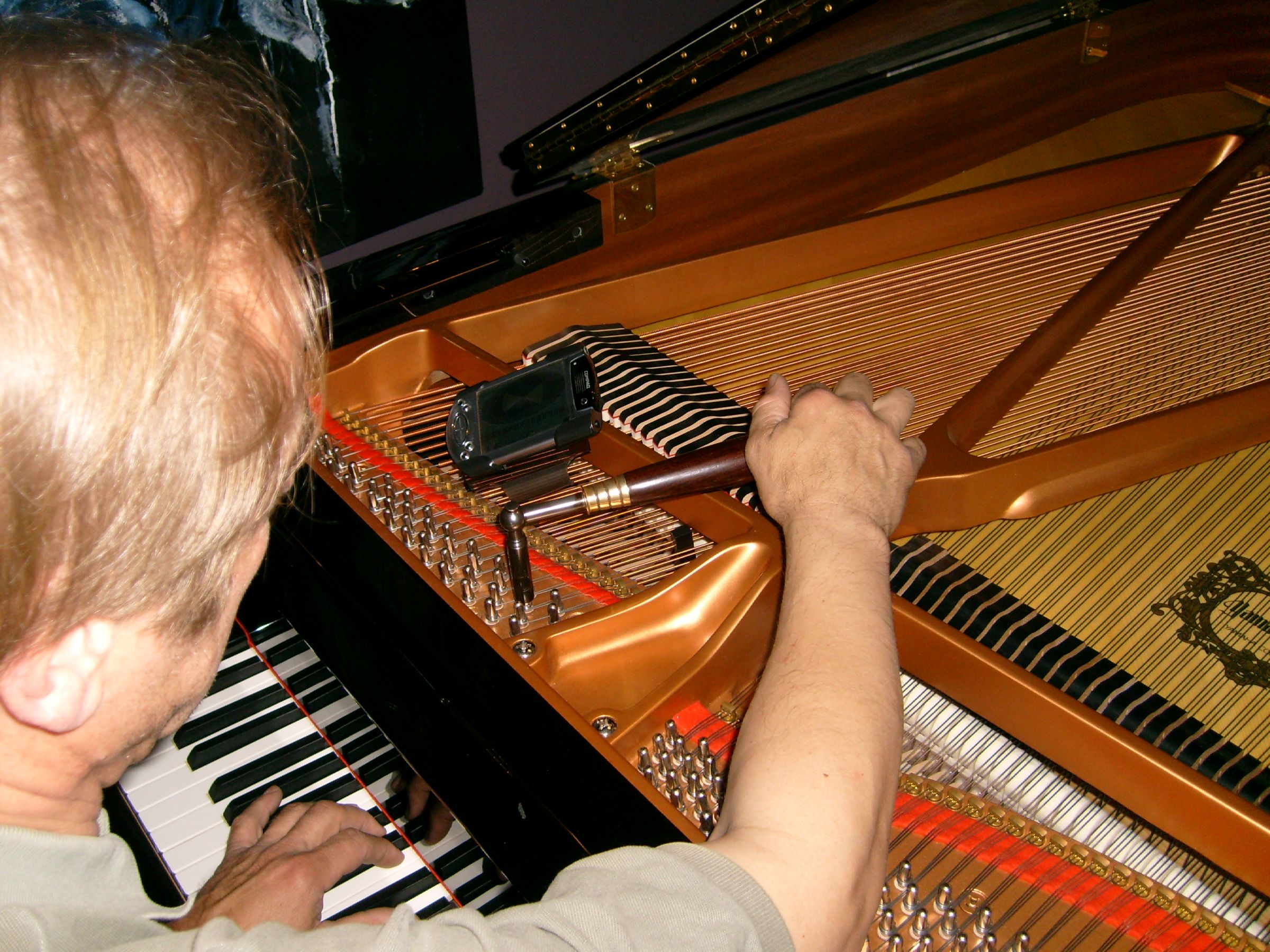
The threaded tuning pins on a piano must be turned with a tuning lever.

A one-cord-per-note piano being tuned with a tuning lever.

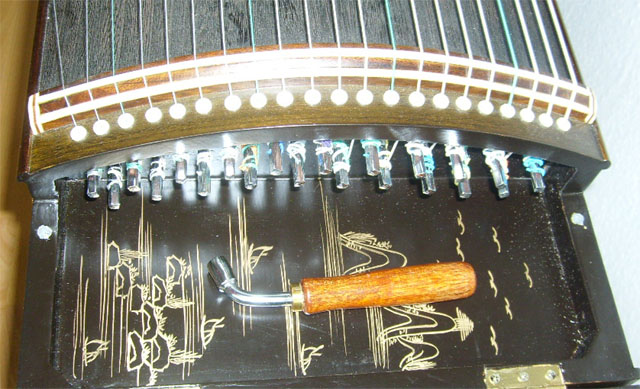
Tuning pins and tuning lever on a yatga.

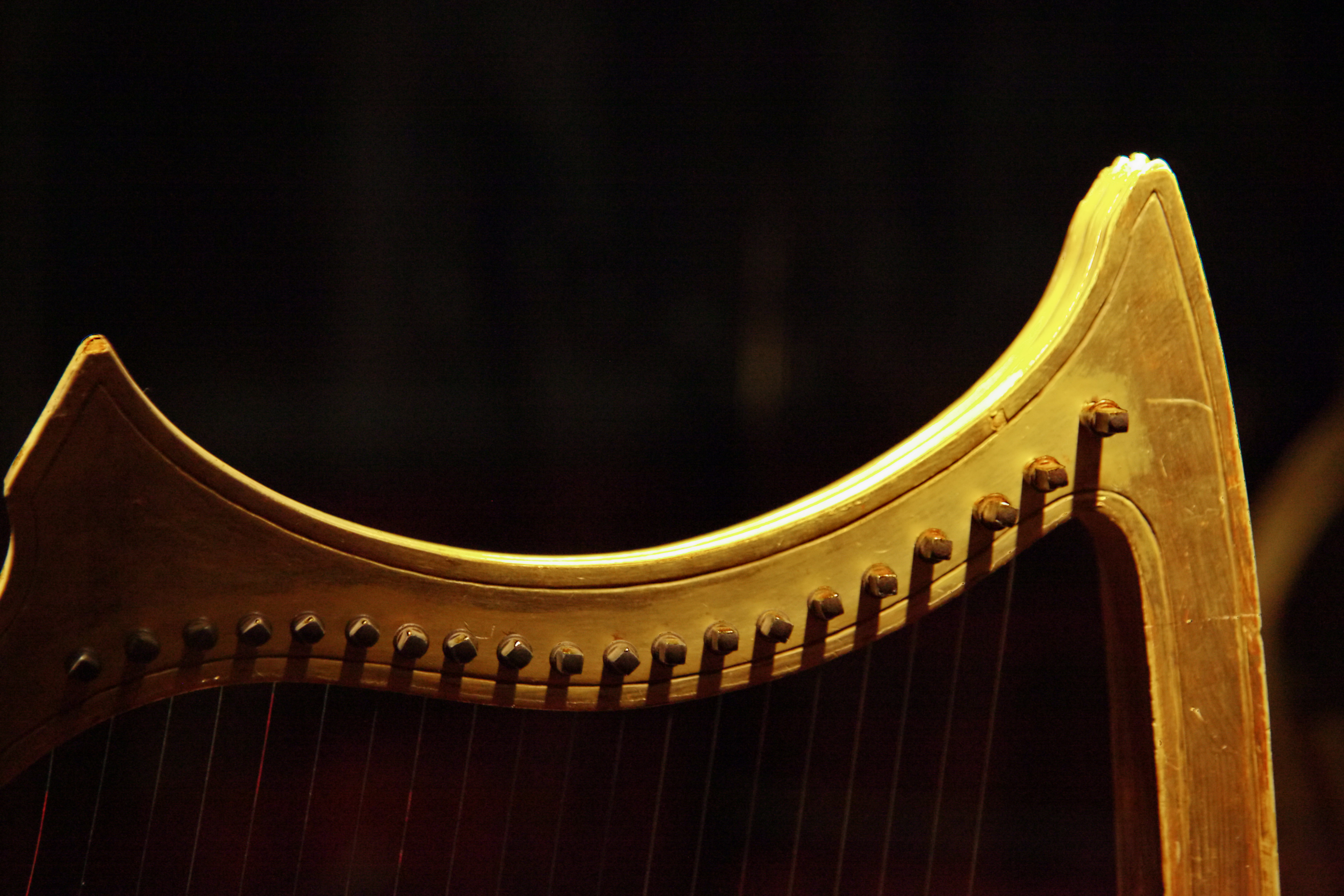
Harps also carry pins rather than pegs.

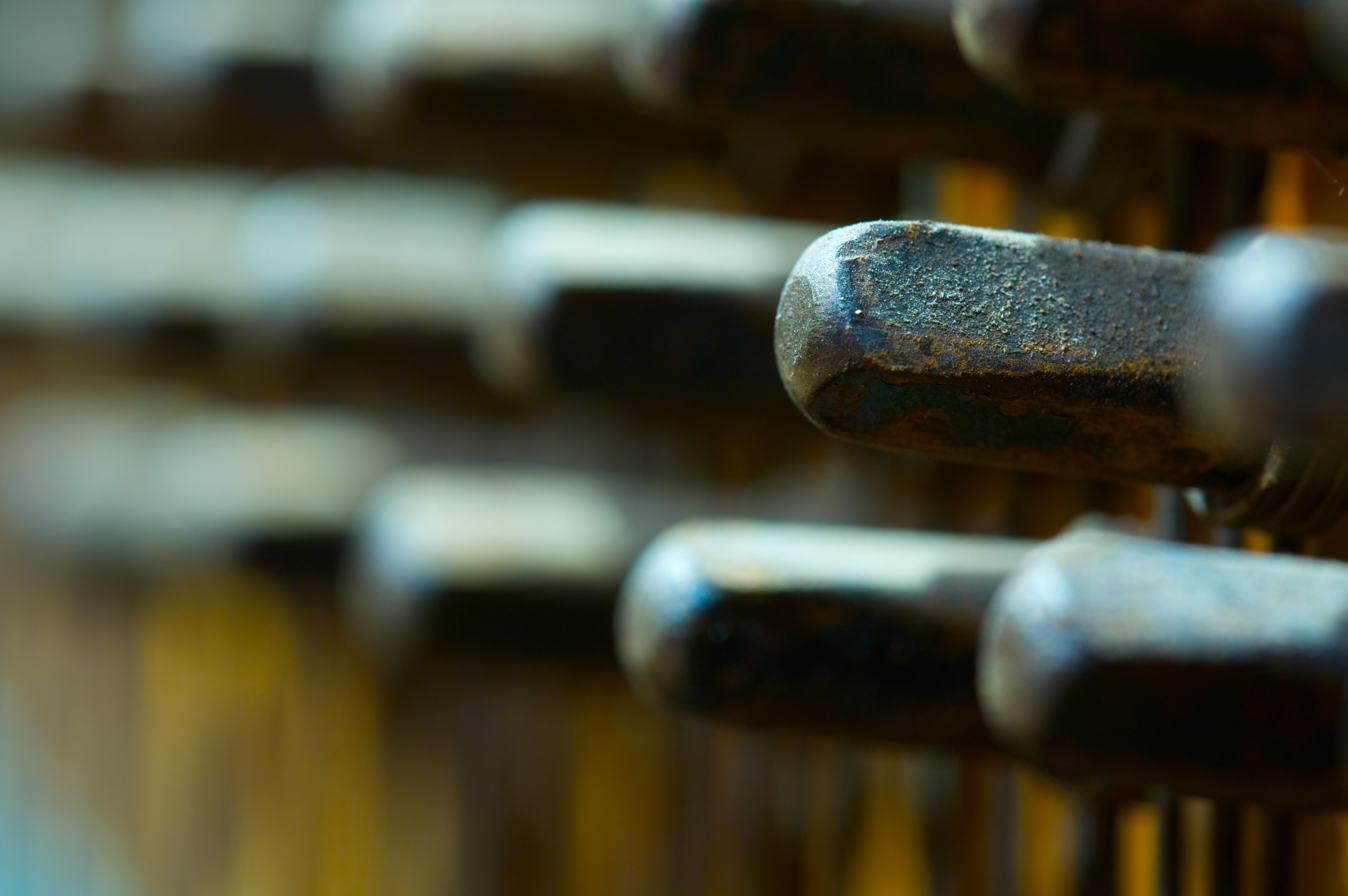
Tuning pins usually have square ends, allowing them to be turned with a square socket.

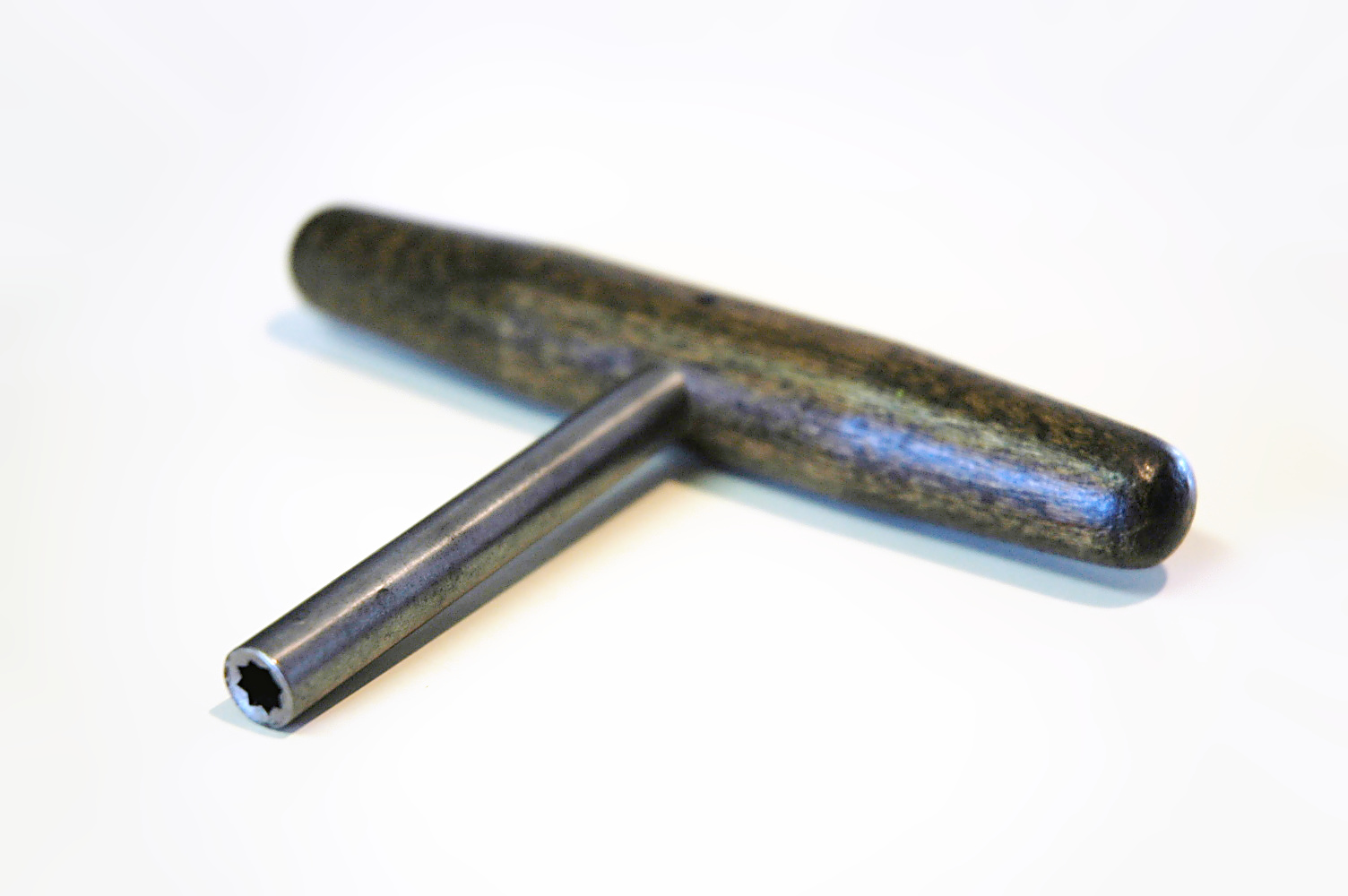
A modern T-shaped tuning wrench.

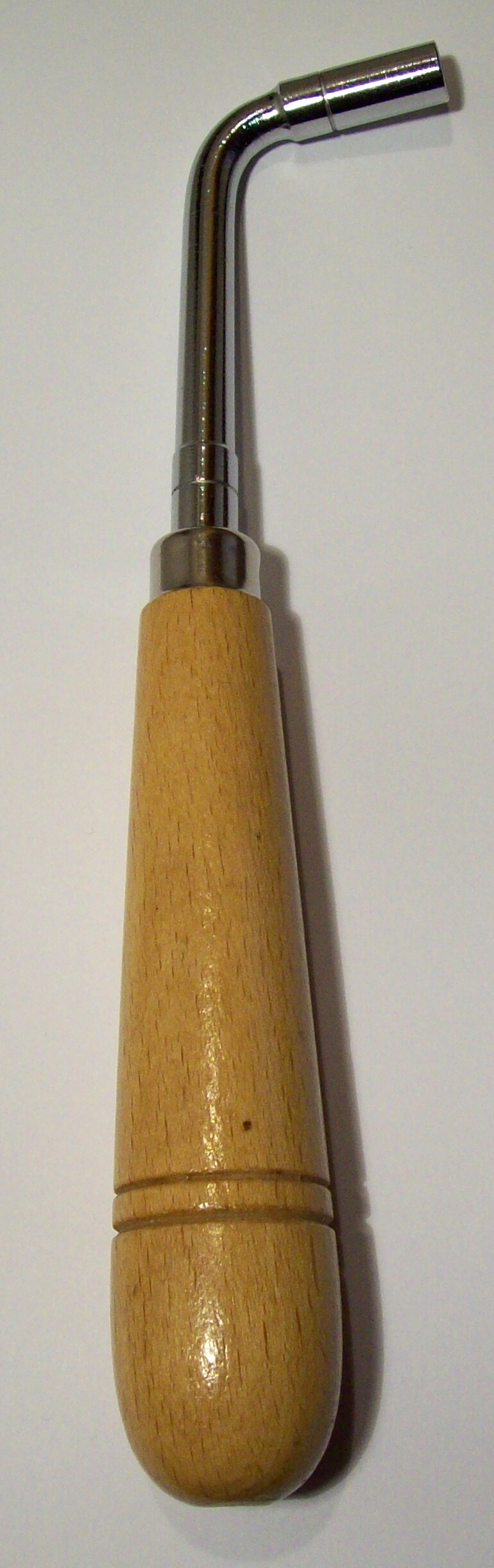
A tuning lever of another shape, like that used on the piano in the earlier image.

== Screw-and-lever tuners ==
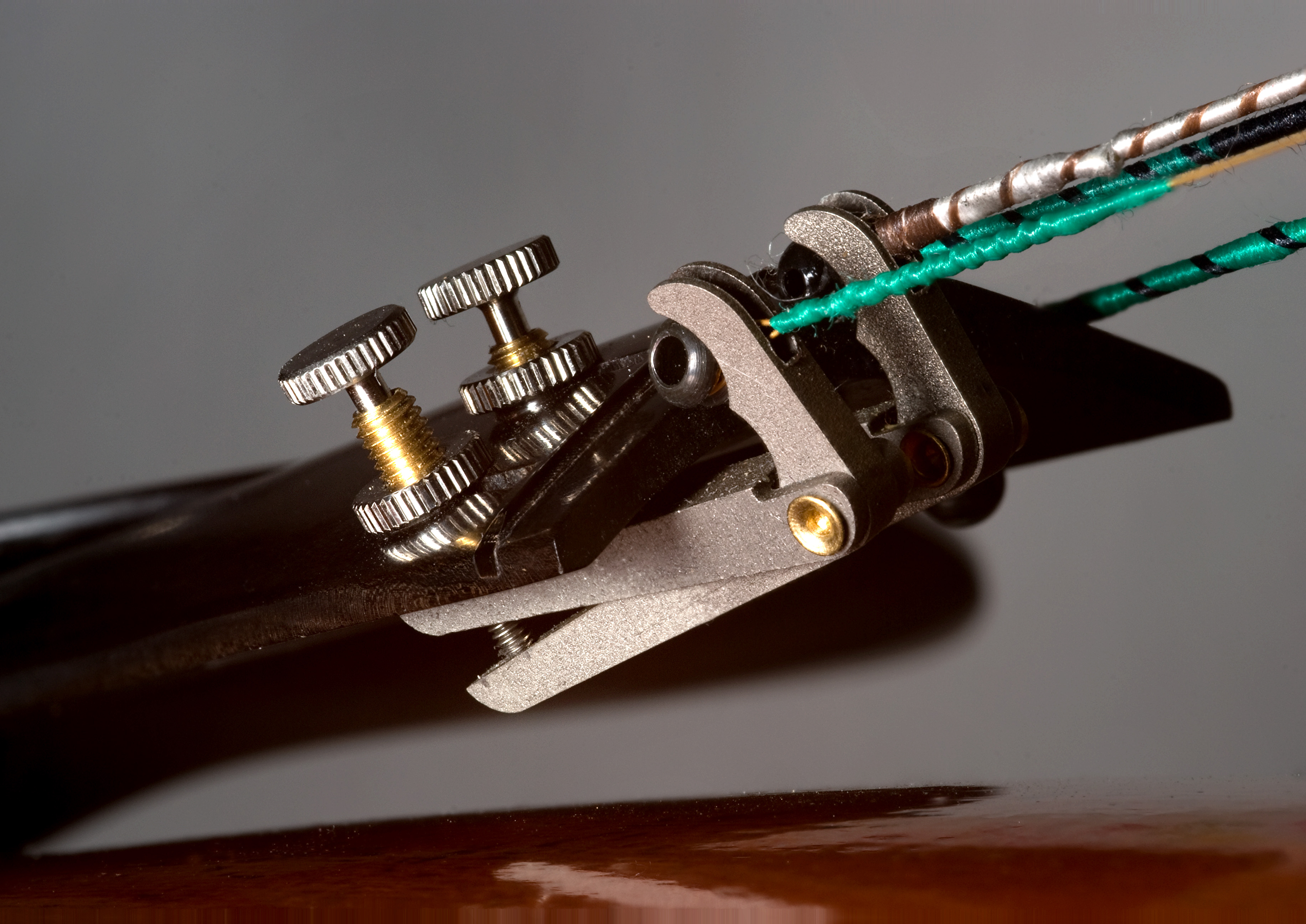
A violin tailpiece. Here, the two strings on the far side pass through the keyhole slots directly, but the nearer two strings use fine tuners.

Fine tuners are used on the tailpiece of some stringed instruments, as a supplement to the tapered pegs at the other end. Tapered pegs are harder to use to make small adjustments to pitch.

Fine tuners are not geared. They have a screw with a knurled head, whose lower end advances against one end of a lever with a right-angle bend in it. The string is fastened to the other end of the lever, and tightening the screw tightens the string. With the screw at the lower limit of its travel, the lever can come close enough to the instrument's top to pose a risk of scarring it. To avoid damage to the top, the screw may be turned out as far as it goes while still engaging the lever, and the string re-tuned using the peg.

Fine tuners can buzz, and may cut strings if not filed smooth before use. They add weight and, when not built into the tailpiece, reduce string afterlength. Fine tuners are common on cellos, but some violinists regard them as an aid for beginners who have not yet learned to tune precisely using pegs alone.

== Geared tuners ==
Pegs for double bass and guitar family instruments are usually geared, and are called tuning machines or machine heads. They often use a worm gear. The gearing ratio varies; while higher ratios are more sensitive, they are also more difficult to manufacture precisely. Machine heads may be open, with exposed gears, or closed, with a casing around all the gears.

Geared pegs for violin family instruments also exist, although they have not gained wide use, which has to do with the extensive and irreversible physical modification that must be made to the peg box in order to mount them, which is often viewed as ruining the aesthetics of the instrument, combined with a bad reputation they acquired due to poorly designed early models that were prone to failure, often with catastrophically damaging results.

The most recently marketed pegs of this sort use planetary gears designed to fit inside a case shaped like a friction peg. They have seen some adoption as they look almost exactly like friction pegs, require no more modification of the instrument than a new set of friction pegs, and make fine tuners unnecessary. They are also durable and less sensitive to changes in temperature and humidity. They are popular on banjos.

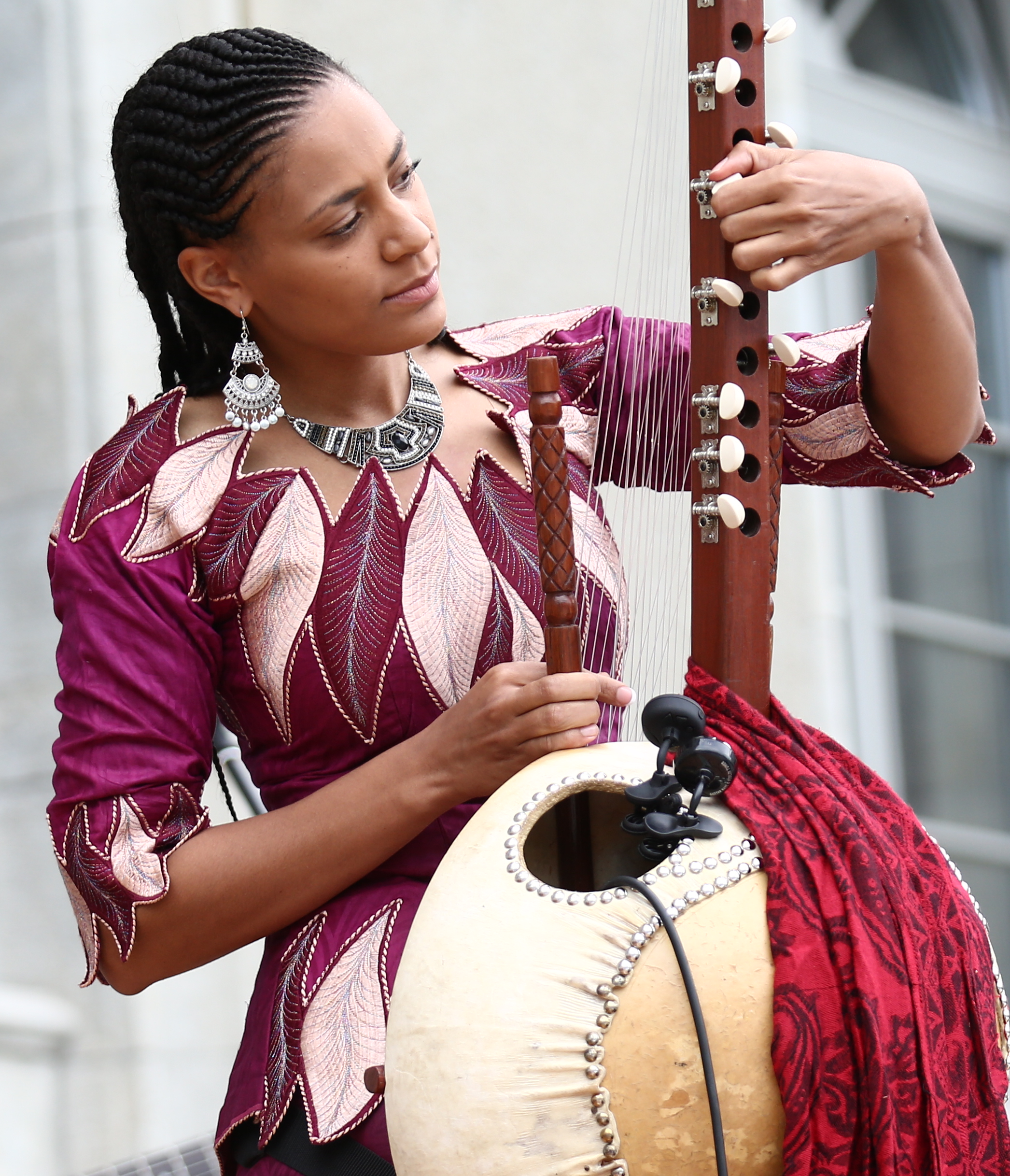
Sona Jobarteh tuning a kora with open machine heads

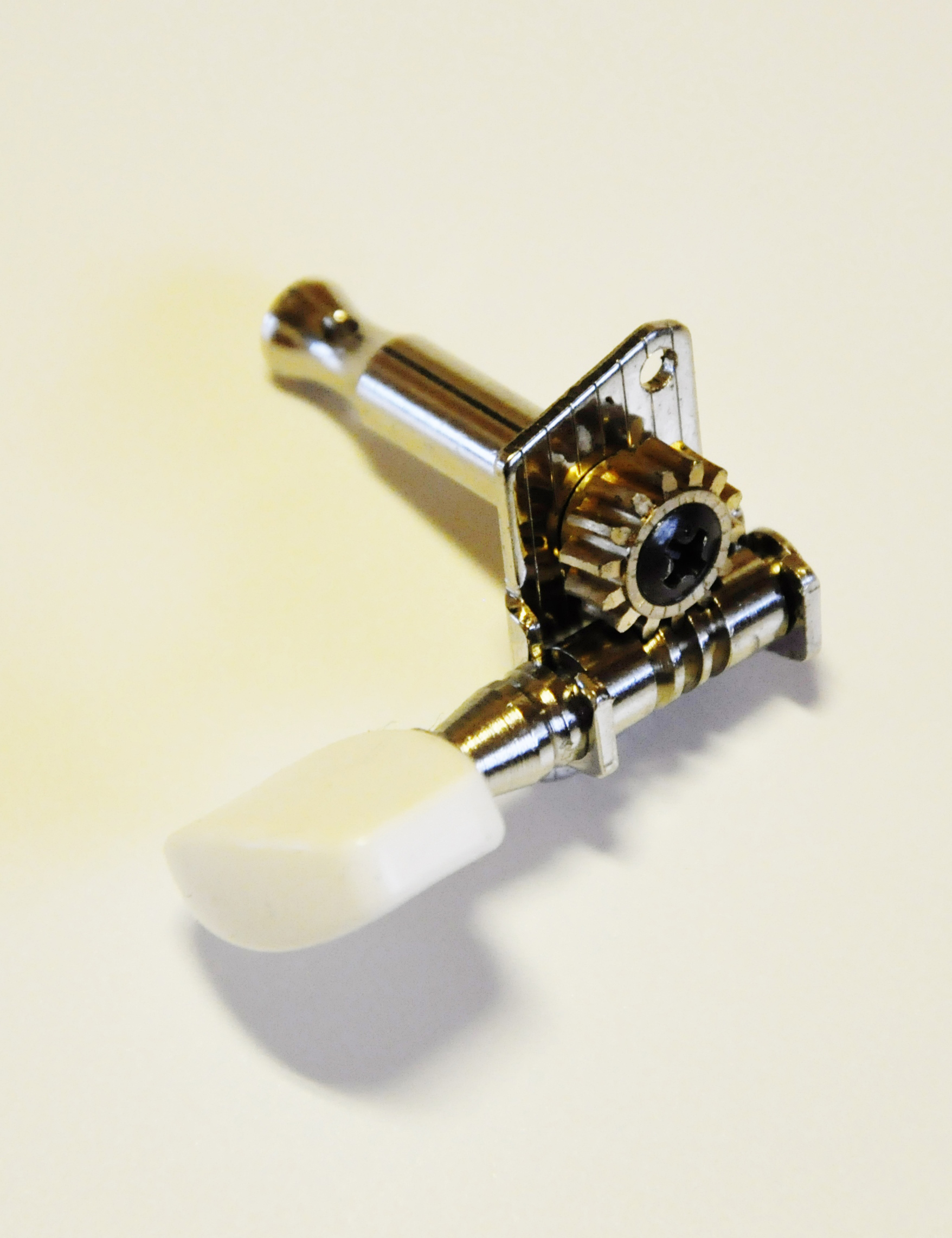
An open machine head, detached from the instrument

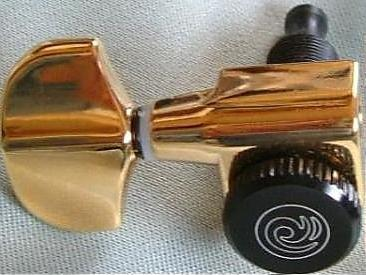
A closed machine head, detached from the instrument

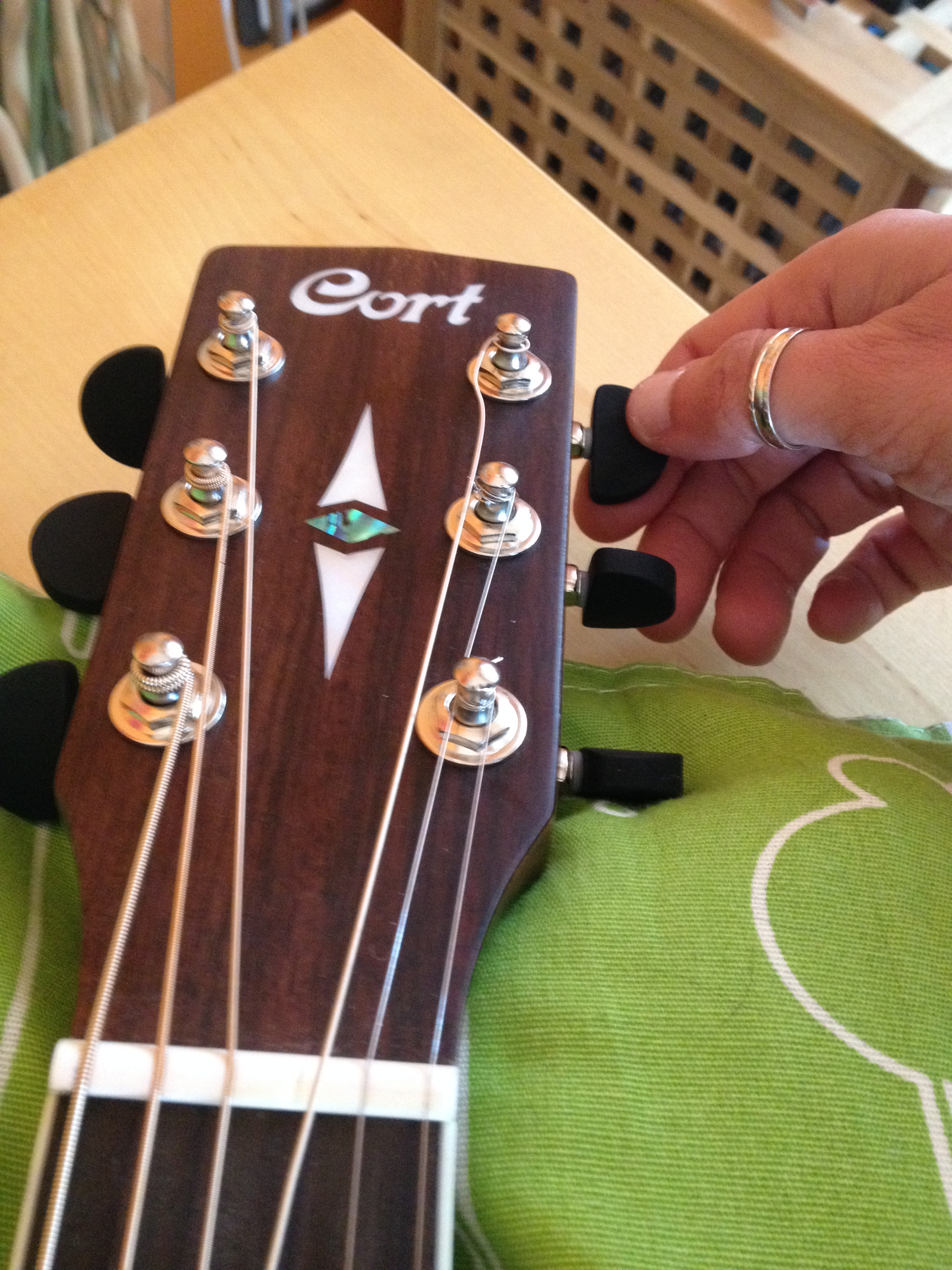
Tuning a guitar with closed machine heads

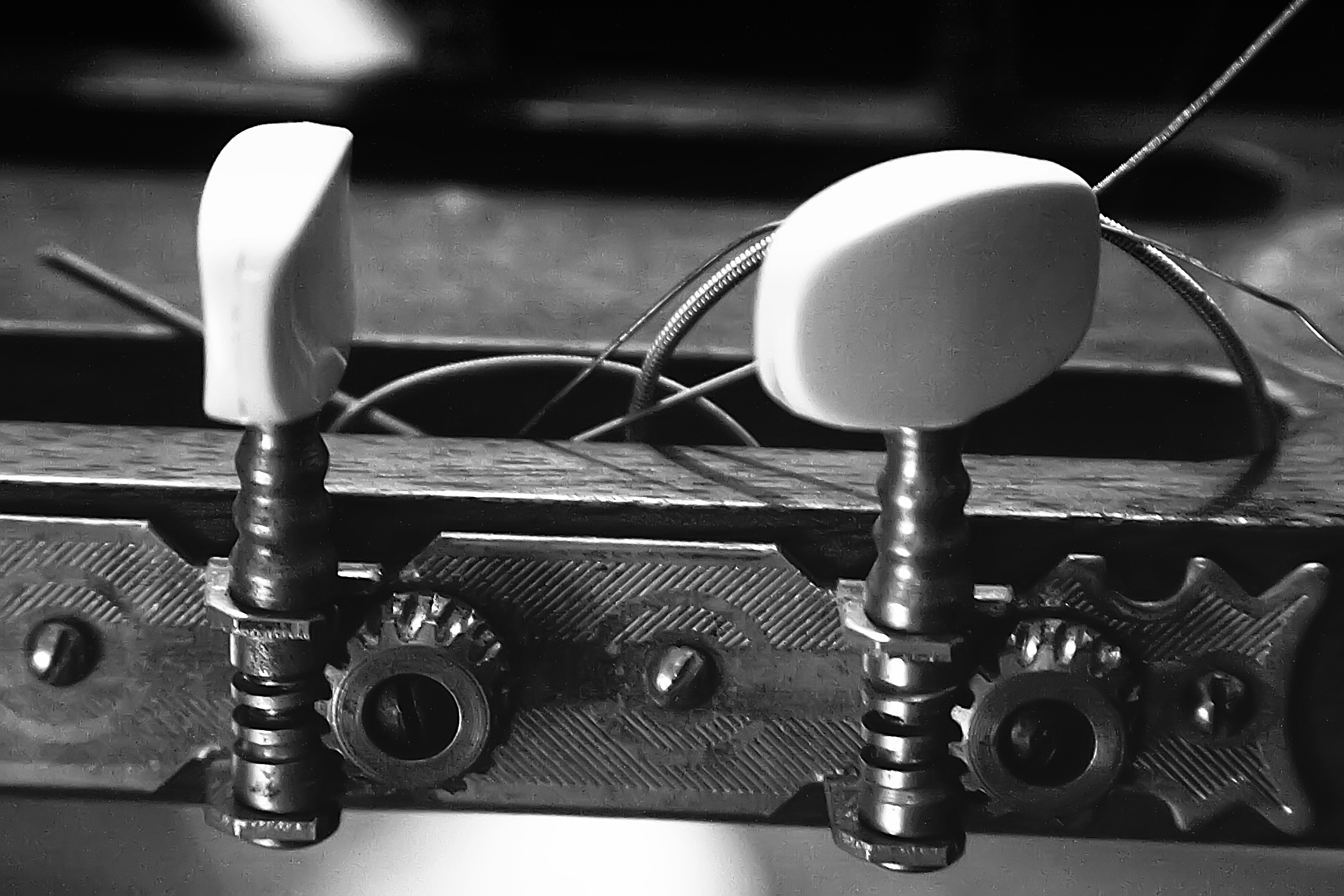
Mounted open machine heads. Note slot in background where the strings are wound around the pin of the tuner.

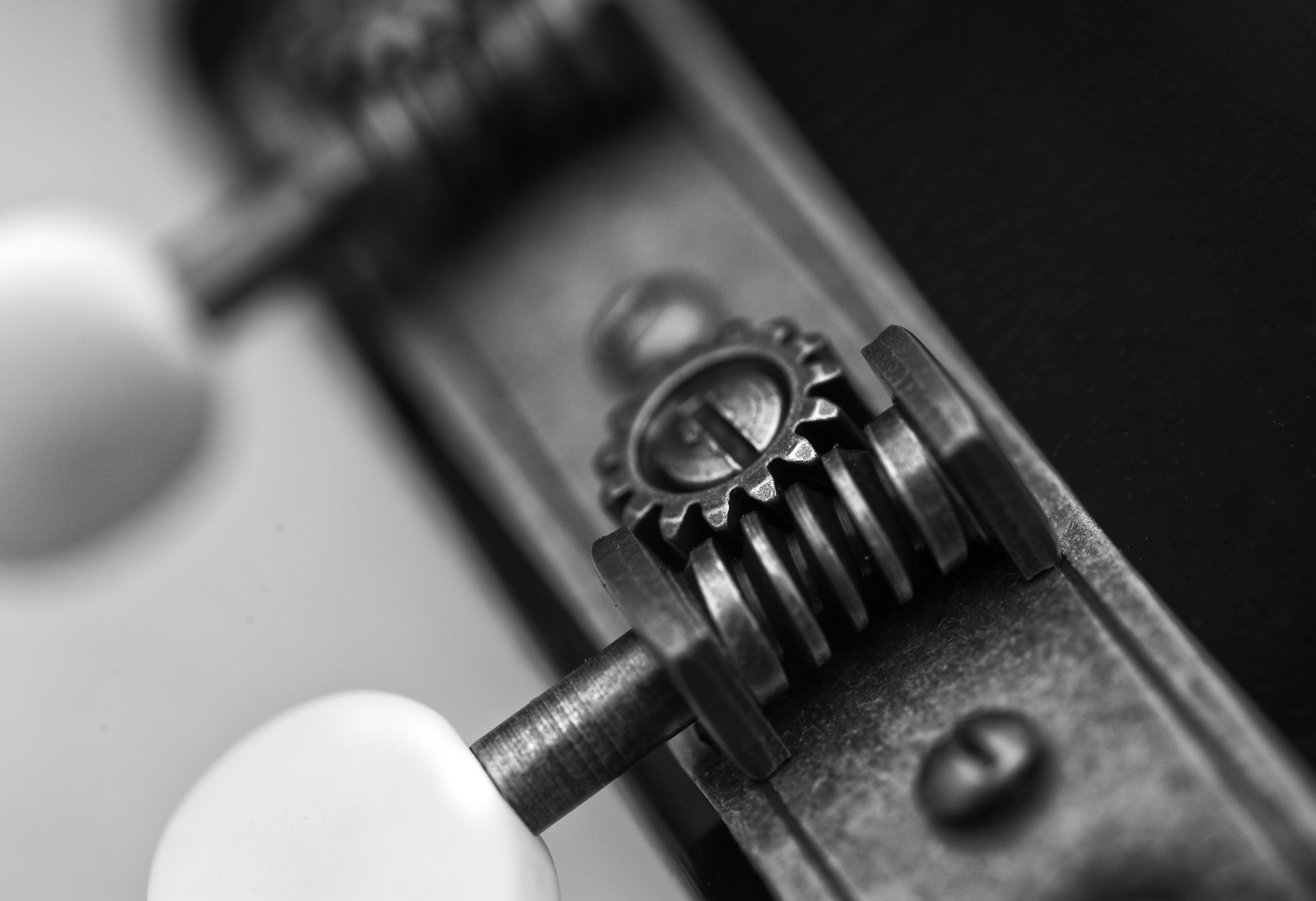
Close-up of the gearing of a mounted open machine head

== Konso ==
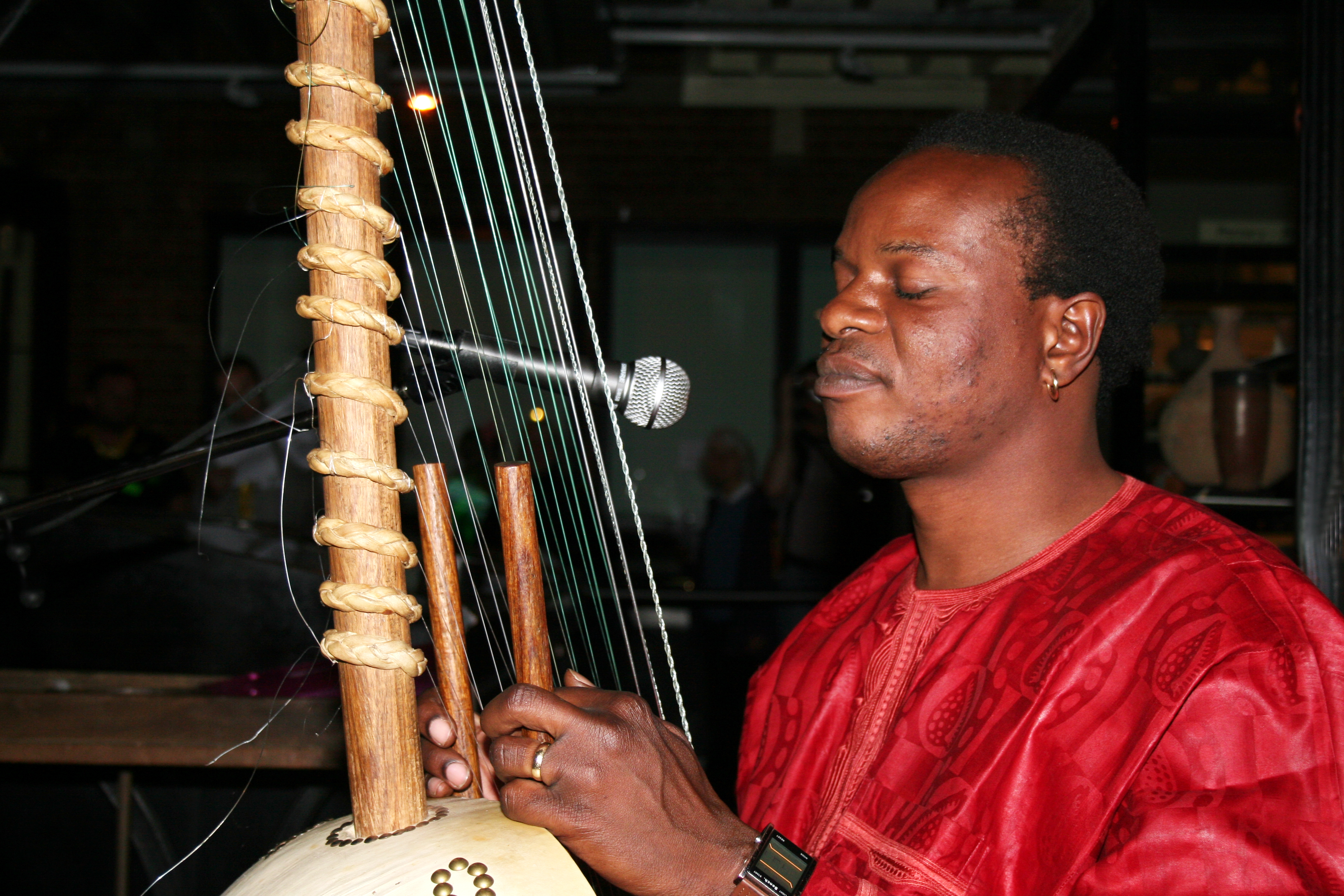
Jali Fily Sissokho playing a kora tuned with konso (braided leather ring) string terminations.

The konso system is traditionally used on koras. It consists of braided leather rings that wrap around the neck of the instrument. The rings are pulled along the neck of the instrument to change string tension. It can be quick to adjust but requires a fair degree of strength.

== Rong Kou ==
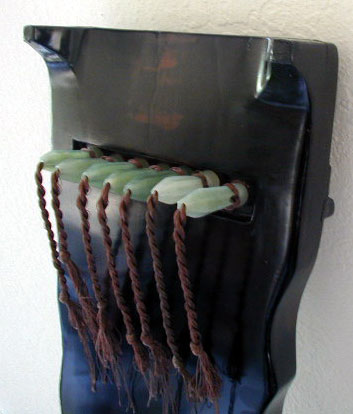
Tuning pegs of the guqin. The twisted Rong Kou cord goes through the bottom hole, through the side hole in the neck, around, under and through the hole in the neck again, and out the top hole. Pegs can be made from wood or jade

The 7-string Chinese Guqin uses braided cords or (rongkou 『絨剅/绒扣』) as a tuning mechanism. At one end, the zither's strings are looped around stationary pegs (fengzu 『鳳足』 "phoenix feet" or yanzu 『雁足』 "geese feet") at the underside of the instrument, across the nut (longyin 『龍齦』 dragon gums) before they pass over the face of the instrument. On the tuning end of each string (near the right hand of the player, at the bridge), a butterfly fly knot (shengtou jie 『蠅頭結/蝇头结』) is tied, and inserted through the loop end of a braided cord (traditionally made of silk due to its inelasticity) which passes through holes behind the bridge to the underside of the instrument. The Rong Kou cord is inserted through the centre of, and then twisted around, tuning pegs. When the strings are at tension, these pegs are held flush to the underside of the instrument in the peg pool (zhen chi 『軫池/轸池』). The pegs are then twisted individually by hand to achieve the desired tension for each string.

== See also ==
- Machine head
- Guqin tunings
