= Piano tuning =

Profession

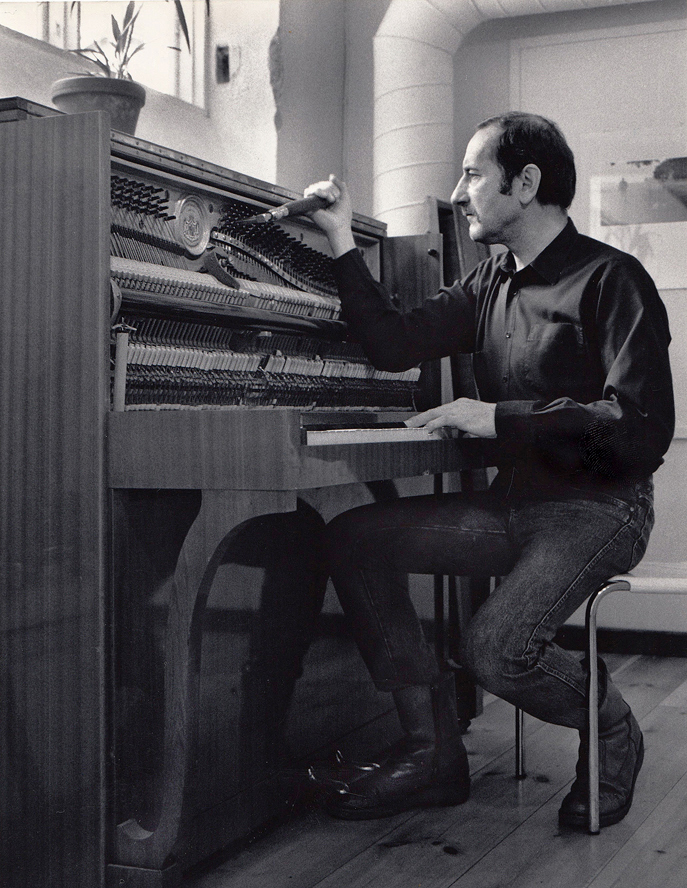
A man tuning an upright piano

Piano tuning is the practice of setting the instrument's intonation. Adjusting the tension of the piano strings is the primary tuning method. Pianos are normally tuned in equal temperament to the A440 Hz pitch standard.

Pianos should be tuned at least twice a year. Concert pianos are ideally tuned before every performance. Piano tuners are often trained and certified by professional organizations like the Piano Technicians Guild.

== Background ==
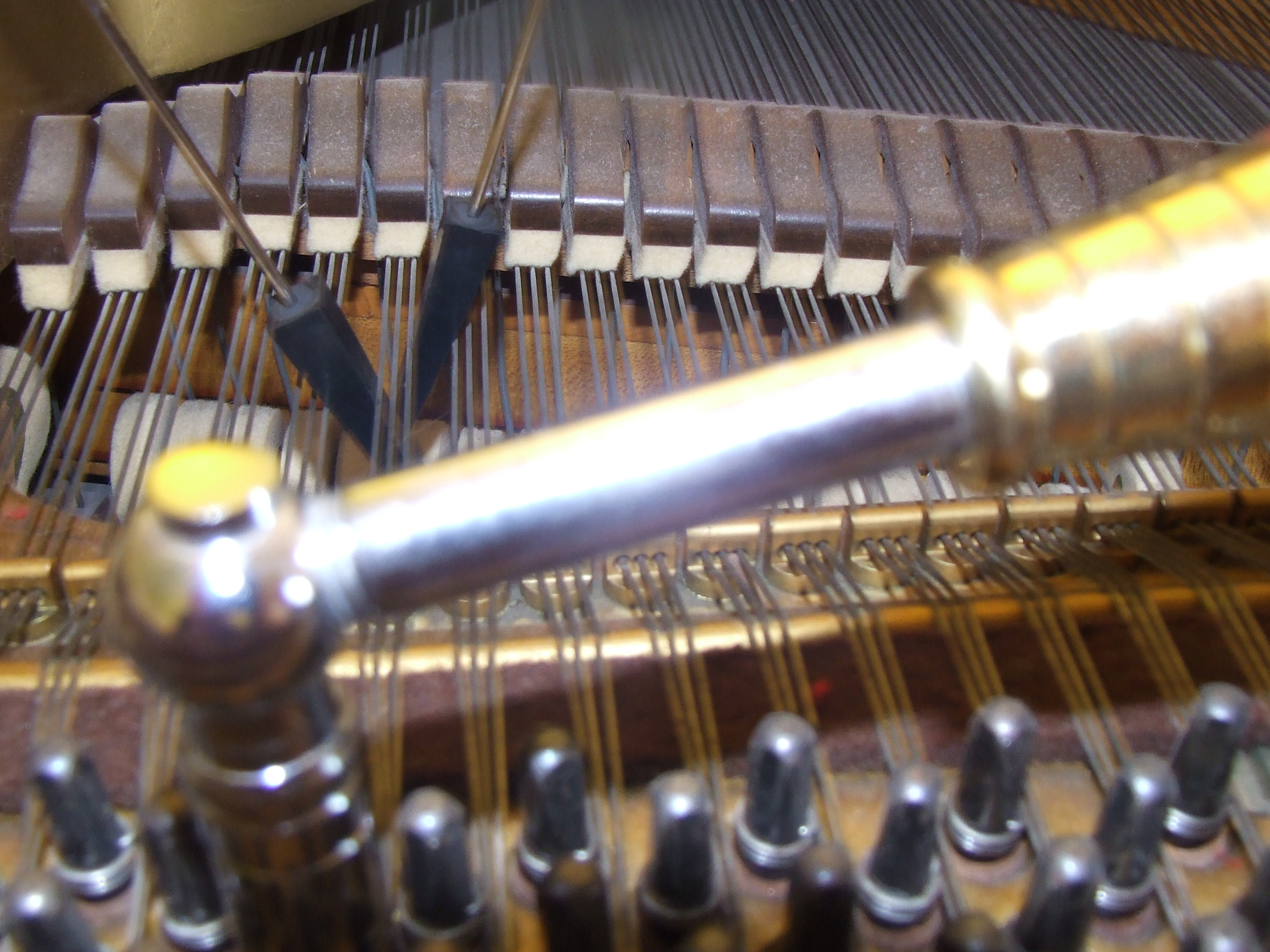
A piano tuner's most basic tools include the tuning lever (or "hammer") and mutes.

An illustration of beating. The sum (blue) of two waves (red, green) is shown as one of the waves increases in frequency. The two waves are initially identical, then the frequency of the green wave is gradually increased by 25%. Constructive and destructive interference results in a beating pattern in the resulting wave.

Many factors cause pianos to go out of tune, particularly atmospheric changes. Changes in humidity will significantly affect the pitch of a piano. High humidity causes the sound board, crowned upward, to swell, crowning it further and pushing upward on the strings, causing the pitch to rise. Low humidity has the opposite effect. To a lesser degree, changes in temperature will also affect the overall pitch of a piano. In newer pianos the strings gradually stretch and wooden parts compress, causing the piano to go flat, while in older pianos the tuning pins (that hold the strings in tune) can become loose and not hold the piano in tune as well.

Frequent and hard playing can also cause a piano to go out of tune. Many piano manufacturers recommend that new pianos be tuned four times during the first year, mostly owing to string stretch, and twice a year thereafter.

An out-of-tune piano can often be identified by the characteristic "honky tonk", warbling, or beating sound it produces. This fluctuation in the sound intensity is a result of two (or more) tones of similar frequencies being played together. For example, if a piano string tuned to 440 Hz (vibrations per second) is played together with a string tuned to 442 Hz, the resulting tone beats at a frequency of 2 Hz, due to the constructive and destructive interference between the two sound waves. Likewise, if a string tuned to 220 Hz (with a harmonic at 440 Hz) is played together with a string tuned at 442 Hz, the same 2 Hz beat is heard. Because pianos typically have multiple strings for each piano key, these strings must be tuned to the same frequency to eliminate beats.

The pitch of a note is determined by the frequency of vibrations. For a vibrating string, the frequency is determined by the string's length, mass, and tension. Piano strings are wrapped around tuning pins, which are turned to adjust the tension of the strings.

=== History ===
Piano tuning became a profession around the beginning of the 1800s, as the "pianoforte" became mainstream. Previously, musicians owned harpsichords, which were much easier to tune, and which the musicians generally tuned themselves. Early piano tuners were trained and employed in piano factories, and often underwent an apprenticeship of about 5–7 years. Early tuners faced challenges related to a large variety of new and changing pianos and non-standardized pitches.

Historically, keyboard instruments were tuned using just intonation, pythagorean tuning and meantone temperament meaning that such instruments could sound "in tune" in one key, or some keys, but would then have more dissonance in other keys. The development of well temperament allowed fixed-pitch instruments to play reasonably well in all of the keys. The famous "Well-Tempered Clavier" by Johann Sebastian Bach took advantage of this breakthrough, with preludes and fugues written for all 24 major and minor keys.

While unpleasant intervals, such as the wolf interval were avoided, the sizes of intervals were still not consistent between keys, and so each key still had its own distinctive character. During the 1800s this variation led to an increase in the use of quasi- equal temperament, in which the frequency ratio between each pair of adjacent notes on the keyboard were nearly equal, allowing music to be transposed between keys without changing the relationship between notes.

Pianos are generally tuned to an A440 pitch standard that was adopted during the early 20th century in response to widely varying standards. Previously the pitch standards had gradually risen from about A415 during the late 18th century and early 19th century to A435 during the late 19th century. Though A440 is generally the standard, some orchestras, particularly in Europe, use a higher pitch standard, such as A442.

== Theory ==
=== Overtones ===
A schematic of a vibrating string, fixed at both ends, showing the first six normal modes or harmonics

When a piano hammer strikes a string, it excites multiple harmonics which divide the string in subsequently smaller, equal divisions. The first and loudest harmonic is the fundamental frequency, which is the perceived pitch.

The size of the node between each division will vary depending on the thickness and stiffness of the piano string. The resulting inharmonicity creates overtones that vary from the theoretical harmonic series and complicate piano tuning.

=== Temperament ===
David Klavins tunes his Una Corda piano.

The term temperament refers to a tuning system that allows intervals to beat instead of tuning pure or "just intervals". In equal temperament, for instance, a fifth would be tempered by narrowing it slightly, achieved by flattening its upper pitch slightly, or raising its lower pitch slightly.

Tempering an interval causes it to beat. Because the actual tone of a vibrating piano string is not just one pitch, but a complex of tones arranged in a harmonic series, two strings that are close to a simple harmonic ratio such as a perfect fifth beat at higher pitches (at their coincident harmonics), because of the difference in pitch between their coincident harmonics. Where these frequencies can be calculated, a temperament may be tuned aurally by timing the beatings of tempered intervals.

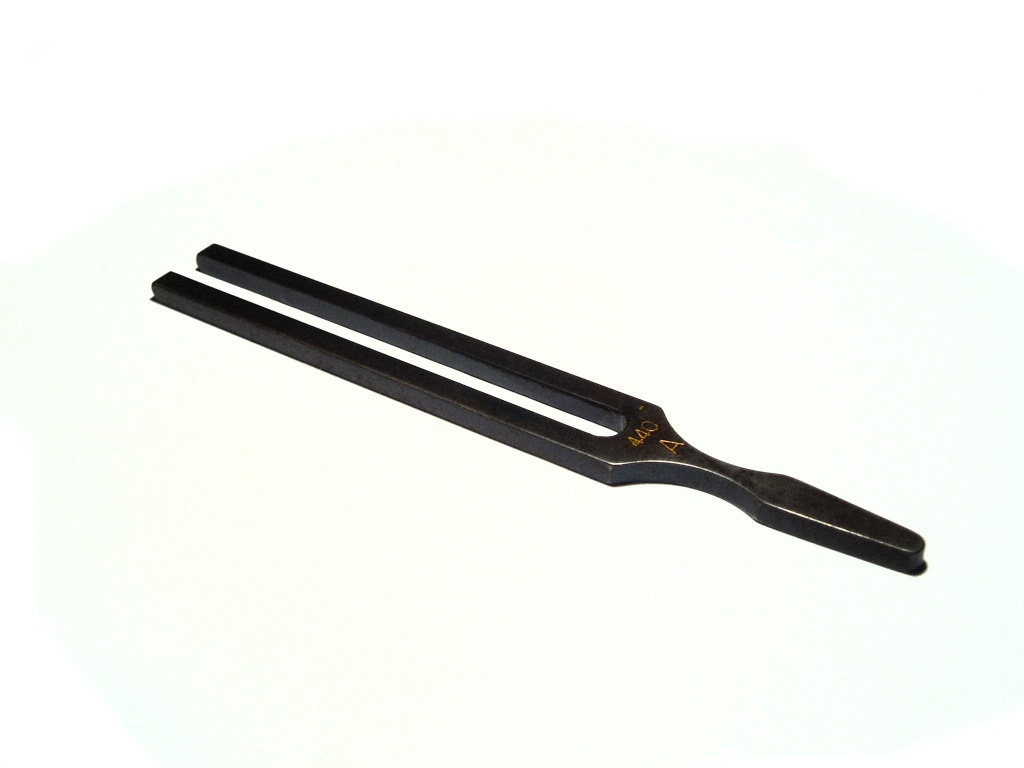
An A440 tuning fork

A common method of tuning the piano begins with tuning all the notes in the "temperament" octave in the lower middle range of the piano, usually F3 to F4. A tuner starts by using an external reference, usually an A440 tuning fork, (or commonly a C523.23 tuning fork) to tune a beginning pitch, and then tunes the other notes in the "temperament" using tempered interval relationships. During tuning it is common to assess perfect fifths and fourths, major and minor thirds, and major and minor sixths, often playing the intervals in an ascending or descending pattern to hear whether an even progression of beat rates has been achieved.

Having established the 12 notes of the chromatic scale, the technician then replicates the temperament throughout the piano by tuning octaves and cross-checking with other intervals, to align each note with others that have already been tuned.

Electronic piano tuning devices are also commonly used. They are designed to adjust the same tonal complexities that the aural tuner encounters. The devices use sophisticated algorithms to continuously test the harmonic makeup of each string as it is sounded, and apply the derived information to determine its optimal pitch within the context of the entire instrument.

=== Stretch ===
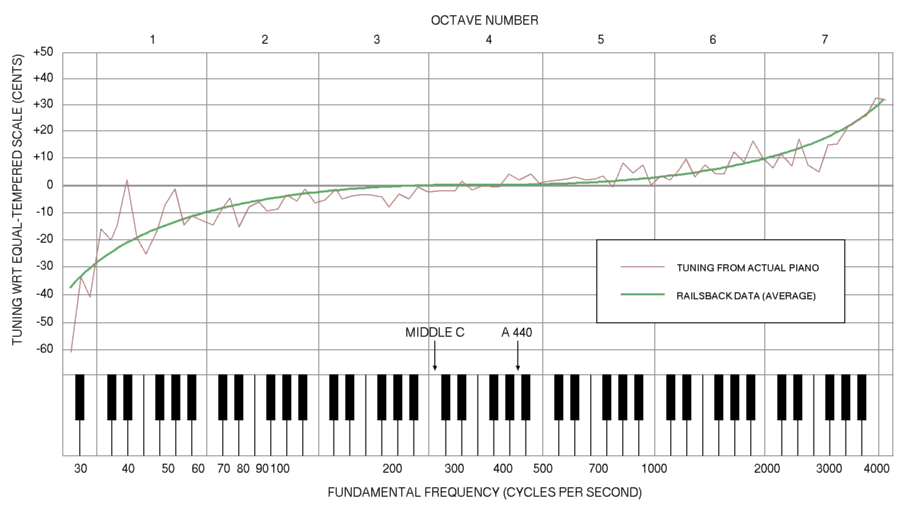
The Railsback curve, indicating the deviation between normal piano tuning and an equally-tempered scale

The tuning described by the above beating plan provides a good approximation of equal temperament across the range of the temperament octave. If extended further, however, the actual tuning of the instrument becomes increasingly inaccurate because of deviation of the real partials from the theoretical harmonics, pianos' partials run slightly sharp, as increasingly higher orders of the harmonic series are reached.

This problem is mitigated by "stretching" the octaves as one tunes above (and to an extent below) the temperament region. When octaves are stretched, they are not tuned to the lowest coincidental overtone (second partial) of the note below, but instead to a higher overtone (often the 4th partial). This widens all intervals equally, thereby maintaining intervallic and tonal consistency.

All western music, but western classical literature in particular, requires this deviation from the theoretical equal temperament because the music is rarely played within a single octave. A pianist constantly plays notes spread over three and four octaves, at least, so it is critical that the mid and upper range of the treble be stretched, or widened, to better match with the inharmonic overtones of lower registers.

Since the stretch of octaves is perceived and not measured, the tuner determines which octave needs more or less octave stretching "by ear". Good tuning requires compromise between tonal brilliance, accurate intonation, and an awareness of gradation of timbre through the compass of the instrument. The name of this modification of the width of the scale is called the piano tuners' octave, as opposed to the simple 2:1 octave expected from a (theoretical) harmonic oscillator.

The amount of stretching necessary to achieve the desired compromise is a complicated determination described theoretically as a function of string scaling. String scaling considers the string's tension, length, diameter, weight per unit length, and in elasticity in either the strings' core wires or any overwinding used to modify the wire's weight. The overwindings are normally made from a denser, heavier, but less "springy" metal than the steel used for the core. Imperfect "springiness" anywhere in the string wire makes its partials deviate slightly from mathematically pure harmonics, and no real material used to generating musical tones is perfectly elastic. The Railsback curve is the result of measuring the fundamental frequencies of stretched tunings and plotting their deviations from unstretched equal temperament.

In small pianos, the inharmonicity is so extreme that establishing a stretch based on a triple octave makes the single octaves beat noticeably, and the wide, fast beating intervals in the upper treble beat wildly – especially major 17ths (two octaves + a major 3rd). By necessity the tuner will attempt to limit the stretch. In large pianos like concert grands, less inharmonicity allows for a more complete string stretch without negatively affecting close octaves and other intervals. So while it may be true that the smaller piano receives a greater stretch relative to the fundamental pitch, only the concert grand's octaves can be fully widened so that triple octaves are beatless. This contributes to the response, brilliance, and "singing" quality that concert grands offer.

A benefit of stretching octaves is the correction of dissonance that equal temperament imparts to the perfect fifth. Without octave stretching, the slow, nearly imperceptible beating of fifths in the temperament region (ranging from little more than one beat every two seconds to about one per second) would double each ascending octave. At the top of the keyboard, then, the theoretically and ideally pure fifth would be beating more than eight times per second. Modern western ears easily tolerate fast beating in non-just intervals (seconds and sevenths, thirds and sixths), but not in perfect octaves or fifths. Happily for pianists, the string stretch that accommodates inharmonicity on a concert grand also nearly exactly mitigates the accumulation of dissonance in the perfect fifth.

Other factors, physical and psychoacoustic, affect the tuner's ability to achieve a temperament. Among physical factors are inharmonic effects due to soundboard resonance in the bass strings, poorly manufactured strings, or peculiarities that can cause "false beats", false because they are unrelated to the manipulation of beats during tuning. The principal psychoacoustic factor is that the human ear tends to perceive the higher notes as being flat when compared to those in the midrange. Stretching the tuning to account for string inharmonicity is often not sufficient to overcome this phenomenon, so piano tuners may stretch the top octave or so of the piano even more.

== Tools and methods ==
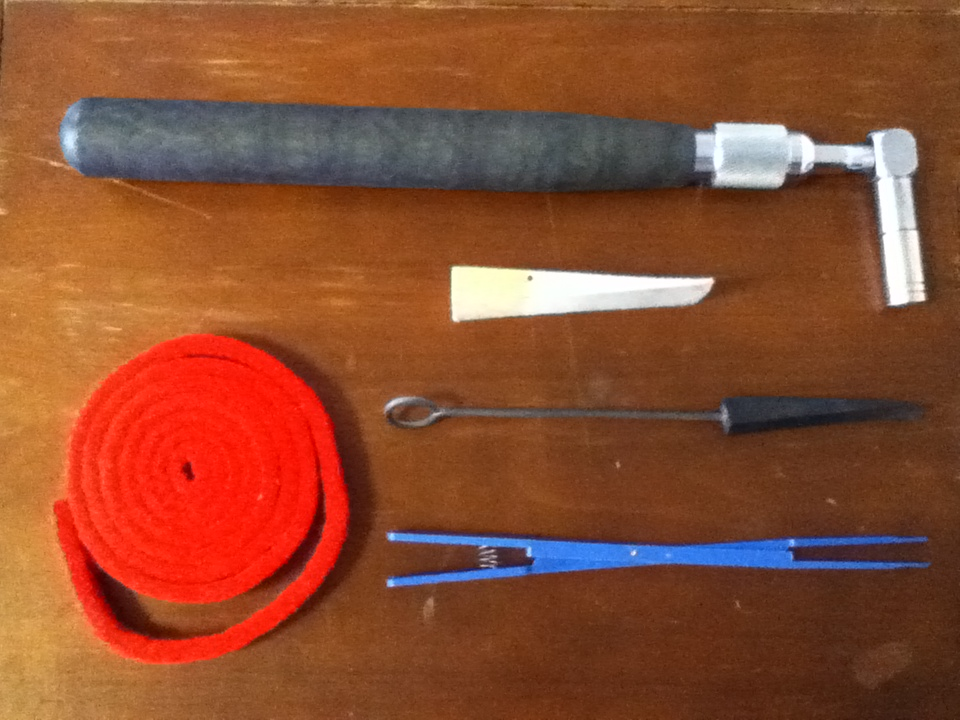
Some common piano tuning tools: From top to bottom: a tuning lever, a felt mute, a rubber mute, a felt temperament strip (left), and a Papps mute.

Common tools for tuning pianos include the tuning lever or "hammer", a variety of mutes, and a tuning fork or electronic tuning device. The tuning lever is used to turn and 'set' the tuning pins, increasing or decreasing the tension of the string. Mutes are used to silence strings that are not being tuned. While tuning the temperament octave, a felt strip is typically placed within the temperament section of the piano, commonly F3-F4. It is inserted into the space between each note's trichord, muting the outer two strings so that only the center string is free to vibrate.

After the center strings are all tuned, the felt strip can be removed note by note, tuning the outer strings to the already established center strings. Wedge-shaped mutes are also inserted as an aid in isolating the strings that need attention. (A Papps mute performs a similar function in an upright piano. It is placed through the piano action to mute either the leftmost or rightmost strings of the unison.)

In an aural tuning, an external reference, whether electronic or tuning fork, is used to tune the first note (generally A4) of the piano. Then a temperament octave is tuned between F3 and F4 using a variety of intervals and checks, until the tuner is satisfied that all the notes in the octave are correctly tuned. The rest of the piano is then tuned to the temperament octave, using octaves and other intervals as checks.

If an electronic tuning device is used, the temperament step might be skipped, as it is possible for the tuner to adjust notes directly with the tuning device in any reasonable order.

== See also ==
- Piano acoustics
- Piano key frequencies
- Pseudo-octave
- Stretched tuning
