= Piano Technicians Guild =

Professional organization

- Abbreviation: PTG
- Formation: 1957
- Headquarters: Kansas City, Kansas
- Region served: International
- President: David Stoneman, RPT
- Executive Director: Aaron Ensminger
- Website: www.ptg.org

The Piano Technicians Guild (PTG) is an international professional organization for piano technicians, those who have demonstrated proficiency in piano maintenance, repair, and tuning. Headquartered in Kansas City, Kansas, the PTG was formed in 1957 from the merger of the American Society of Piano Technicians and the National Association of Piano Tuners.

== Membership categories and requirements ==
The PTG is primarily an American professional association with open membership. It states that anyone with a professional or avocational interest in piano technology may join. The title of Registered Piano Technician (RPT) must be earned by passing a series of examinations. There are three examinations: a written multiple choice test consisting of questions covering all areas of piano technology and tuning, a tuning exam, and a technical exam, where the examinee demonstrates competence in common repairs and regulation of grand and upright actions. For the tuning exam, RPTs perform a standardized piano tuning on a piano that has been master tuned. A master tuning is one that is performed by a group of technicians until they all agree no improvements on the tuning can be made. The results of this "master tuning" are then stored on an electronic tuning device. The piano is then detuned so the examinee can tune it, and the results are compared to the master tuning for scoring.

== Education and conventions ==
Guild members improve their skills through training offered by local chapters and seminars held on the regional and national level. The Piano Technicians Guild also publishes a monthly technical magazine, the Piano Technicians Journal.
