= Tuning wrench =

Socket wrench used to tune string instruments

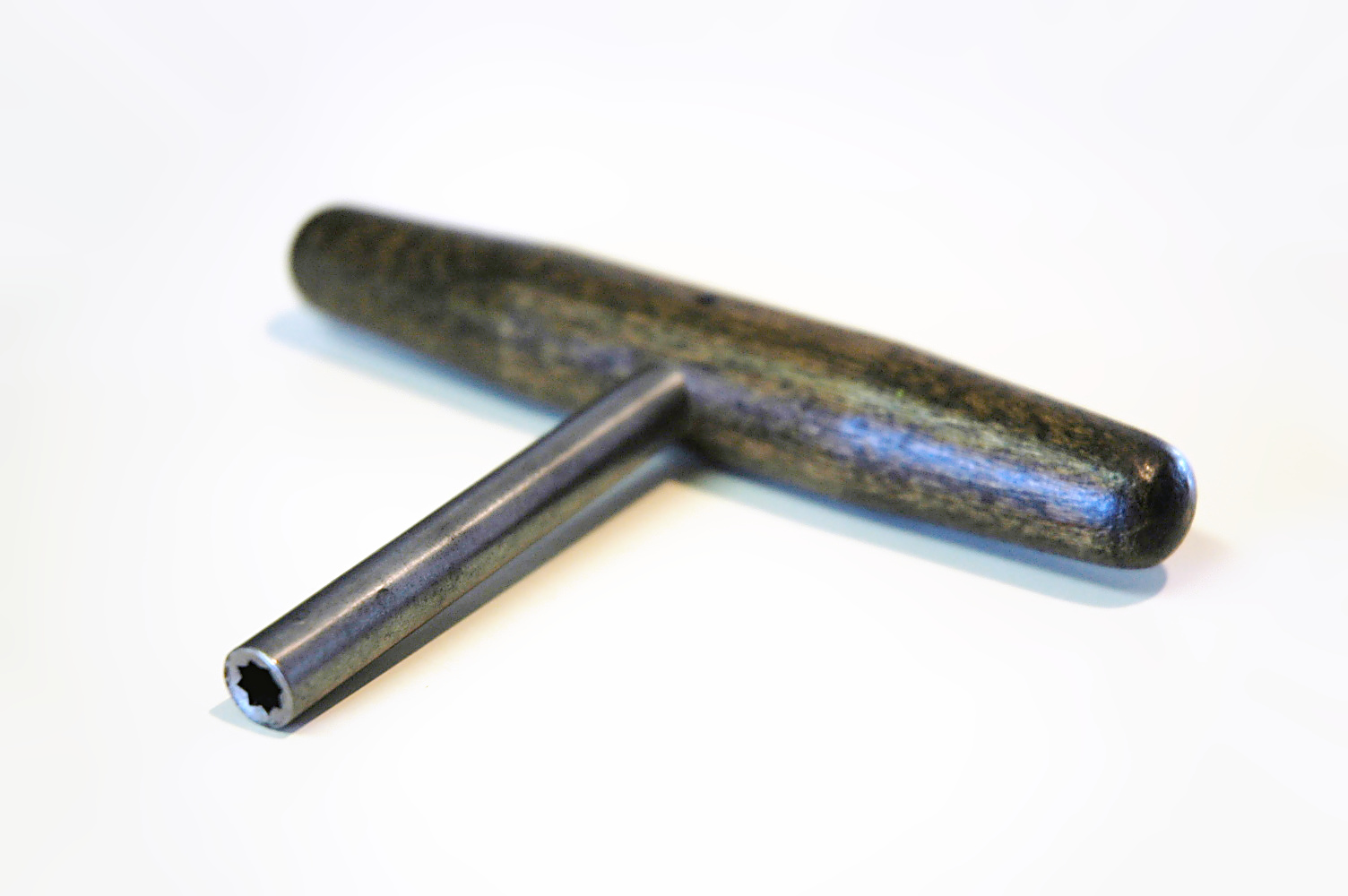
T-shaped tuning wrench

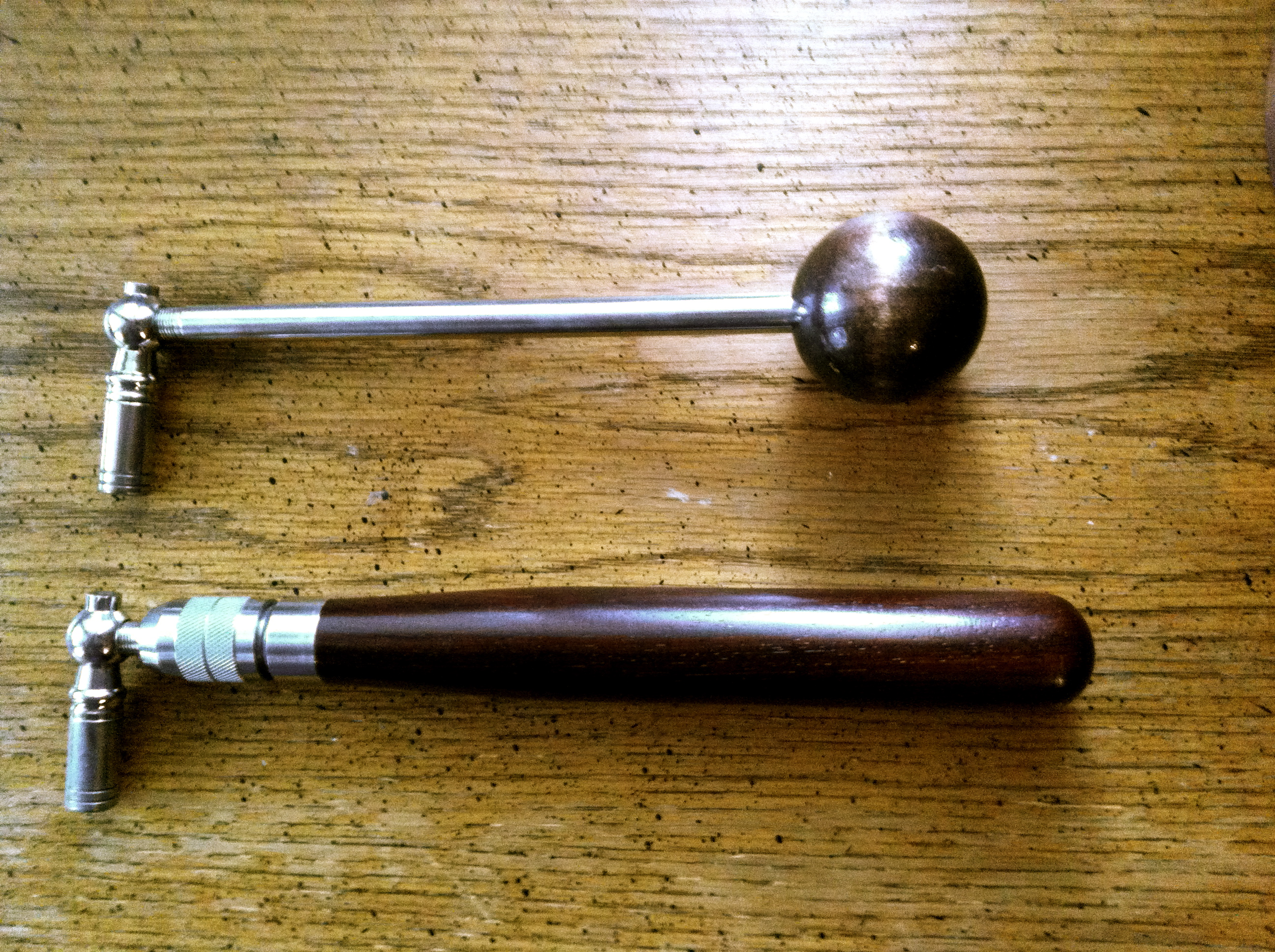
Traditional piano tuning levers

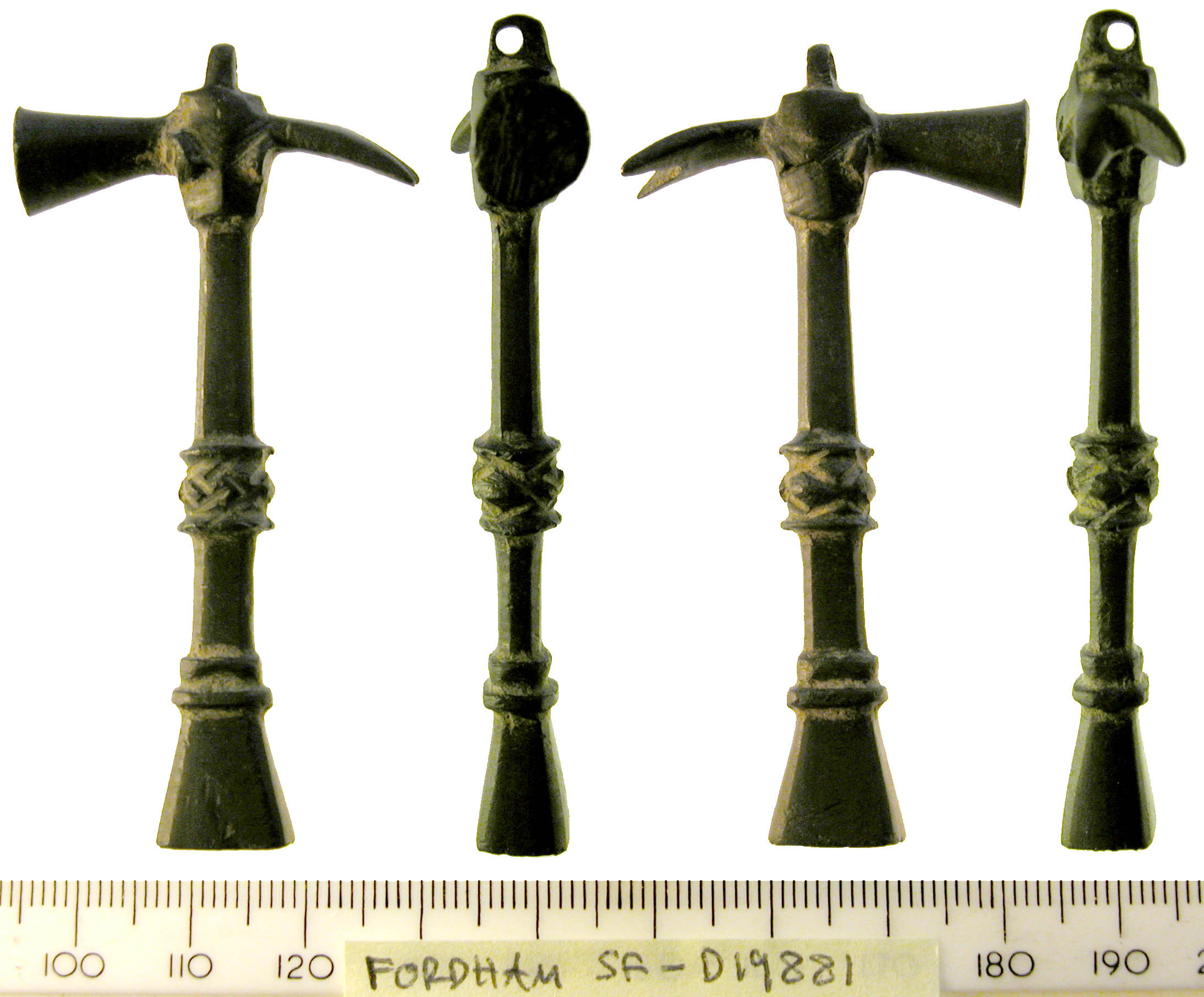
Post-Medieval tuning hammer

A tuning wrench (also called a tuning lever or tuning hammer) is a specialized socket wrench used to tune string instruments, such as the piano, harp, and hammer dulcimer, that have strings wrapped around tuning pins. Other string instruments do not require a tuning wrench because their tuning pins or pegs come with handles (as with the violin), or geared tuning machines (as with the guitar or banjo).

Tuning wrench sockets may be triangular-shaped or eight-pointed star-shaped, and are found in two basic sizes: a large size for pianos, and a smaller size for most other instruments. For pianos, pins are typically square with a slight taper. There are three standard sizes known as No. 1, No. 2 and No. 3, for pins up to 6.5mm, for pins 6.5mm to 7.25mm, and for pins larger than 7.25mm. No. 2 is the most common. Wrenches are supplied with an eight-point star. Some early keyboard instruments have oblong-shaped tuning pins.

Impact piano tuning levers differ from traditional levers in that they are fitted with a weight at the end of the handle. The tuner flicks the lever with their wrist, causing the weight to do the actual work of moving the tuning pin. Tuning wrench sockets are often attached snugly to the handle with fine-gauge machine-screw threads, to provide a very firm, immobile joint; this is in contrast to the square snap-on joints found in sockets used for machinery.

Unlike most socket wrenches, tuning wrenches usually have a comfortable wood or nylon handle. They are found in two basic shapes: L-shaped and T-shaped. L-shaped handles for pianos are available in several angles that are not quite right angles, provide greater leverage than T-shaped handles, and the angle provides clearance for the handle over adjacent pins, allowing a very short and stiff socket to be used. This enables a better feel and control of the tiny movements of the tuning pin, within the pin-block. T-shaped handles are used for many lower-tension instruments such as the harpsichord, harp, and dulcimer. T-shaped handles help keep torque parallel to the shaft of the tuning pin, and thus avoid bending the pin and widening the wooden hole that holds the tuning pin.

== See also ==
- Drum key, a similar tool used for tuning drums and adjusting drum hardware
