= Piano key frequencies =

This is a list of the fundamental frequencies in hertz (cycles per second) of the keys of a modern 88-key standard or 112-key extended piano in twelve-tone equal temperament, with the 49th key, the fifth A (called A_{4}), tuned to 440 Hz (referred to as A440). Every octave is made of twelve steps called semitones. A jump from the lowest semitone to the highest semitone in one octave doubles the frequency (for example, the fifth A is 440 Hz and the sixth A is 880 Hz). The frequency of a pitch is derived by multiplying (ascending) or dividing (descending) the frequency of the previous pitch by the twelfth root of two (approximately 1.059463). For example, to get the frequency one semitone up from A_{4} (A♯_{4}), multiply 440 Hz by the twelfth root of two. To go from A_{4} up two semitones (one whole tone) to B_{4}, multiply 440 twice by the twelfth root of two (or once by the sixth root of two, approximately 1.122462). To go from A_{4} up three semitones to C_{5} (a minor third), multiply 440 Hz three times by the twelfth root of two (or once by the fourth root of two, approximately 1.189207). For other tuning schemes, refer to musical tuning.

This list of frequencies is for a theoretically ideal piano. On an actual piano, the ratio between semitones is slightly larger, owing to string stiffness that causes inharmonicity, i.e., the tendency for the harmonic makeup of each note to run sharp. To compensate for this, octaves are tuned slightly wide, stretched according to the inharmonic characteristics of each instrument. This deviation from equal temperament is graphically represented by the Railsback curve.

The following equation gives the frequency f (Hz) of the n^{th} key on the idealized standard piano with the 49th key tuned to A_{4} at 440 Hz:

$$f(n)  =  \left(\sqrt[12]{2}\,\right)^{n-49} \times 440 \,\text{Hz}\,  =  2^{\frac{n-49}{12}} \times 440 \,\text{Hz}\,$$

where n is shown in the table below.

Conversely, the key number of a pitch with a frequency f (Hz) on the idealized standard piano is:

$$n = 12 \, \log_2\left({\frac{f}{440 \,\text{Hz}}}\right) + 49$$

== List ==
An 88-key piano, with the octaves numbered and with Middle C (cyan) and A440 (yellow) highlighted

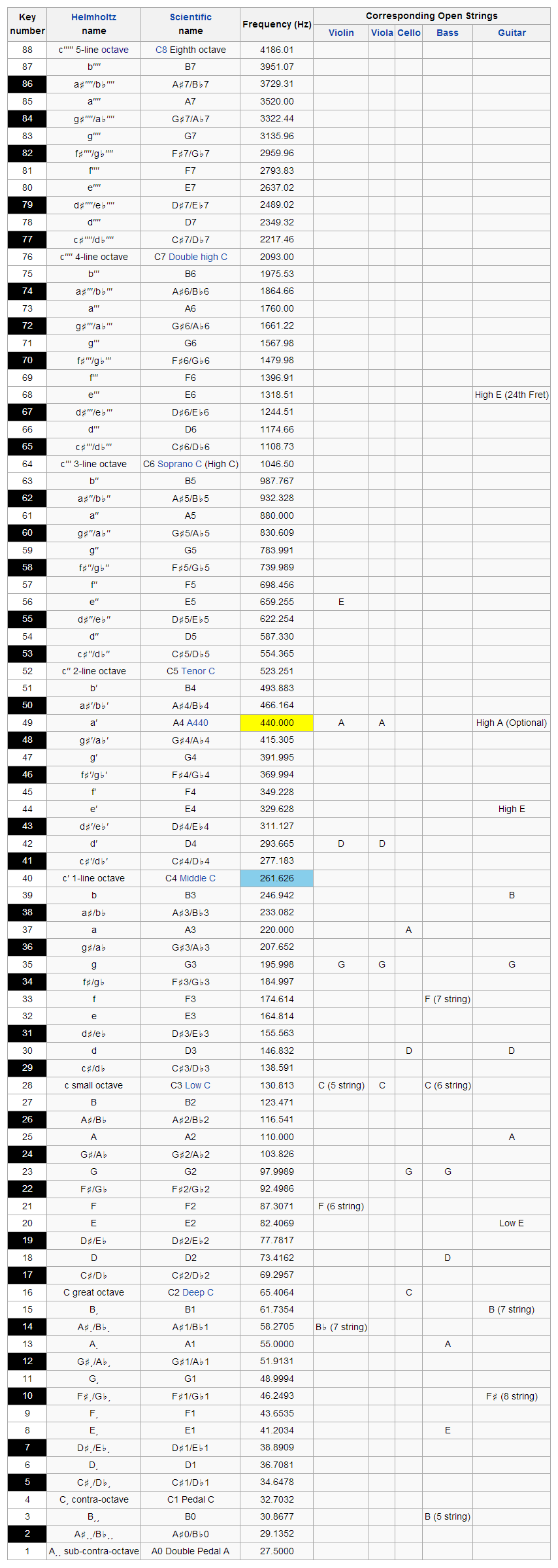
A printable version of the standard 88 keys' frequencies

Values in bold are exact on an idealized standard piano. Keys shaded gray are rare and only appear on extended pianos. The normal 88 keys are numbered 1 to 88; extra low and high keys which only appear on extended pianos are numbered −11 to 0 and 89 to 100 respectively. A 112-key piano that extends from A_{−1} to C_{9} (MIDI note number 9 to 120) was first built between 2022 and 2024 by Stuart & Sons.

Piano key number	MIDI note number	Helmholtz name	Scientific pitch name	Frequency f(n) (Hz) (Equal temperament)	Corresponding open strings on other instruments						Vocal Ranges					
Piano key number	MIDI note number	Helmholtz name	Scientific pitch name	Frequency f(n) (Hz) (Equal temperament)	Violin	Viola	Cello	Bass	Guitar	Ukulele	Soprano	Mezzo-soprano	Contralto	Tenor	Baritone	Bass
100	120	c′′′′′′ 6-line octave	C_{9}	8372.018												
99	119	b′′′′′	B_{8}	7902.133												
98	118	a♯′′′′′/b♭′′′′′	A♯_{8}/B♭_{8}	7458.620												
97	117	a′′′′′	A_{8}	**7040.000**												
96	116	g♯′′′′′/a♭′′′′′	G♯_{8}/A♭_{8}	6644.875												
95	115	g′′′′′	G_{8}	6271.927												
94	114	f♯′′′′′/g♭′′′′′	F♯_{8}/G♭_{8}	5919.911												
93	113	f′′′′′	F_{8}	5587.652												
92	112	e′′′′′	E_{8}	5274.041												
91	111	d♯′′′′′/e♭′′′′′	D♯_{8}/E♭_{8}	4978.032												
90	110	d′′′′′	D_{8}	4698.636												
89	109	c♯′′′′′/d♭′′′′′	C♯_{8}/D♭_{8}	4434.922												
88	108	c′′′′′ 5-line octave	C_{8} Eighth octave	4186.009												
87	107	b′′′′	B_{7}	3951.066												
86	106	a♯′′′′/b♭′′′′	A♯_{7}/B♭_{7}	3729.310												
85	105	a′′′′	A_{7}	**3520.000**												
84	104	g♯′′′′/a♭′′′′	G♯_{7}/A♭_{7}	3322.438												
83	103	g′′′′	G_{7}	3135.963												
82	102	f♯′′′′/g♭′′′′	F♯_{7}/G♭_{7}	2959.955												
81	101	f′′′′	F_{7}	2793.826												
80	100	e′′′′	E_{7}	2637.020												
79	99	d♯′′′′/e♭′′′′	D♯_{7}/E♭_{7}	2489.016												
78	98	d′′′′	D_{7}	2349.318												
77	97	c♯′′′′/d♭′′′′	C♯_{7}/D♭_{7}	2217.461												
76	96	c′′′′ 4-line octave	C_{7} Double high C	2093.005												
75	95	b′′′	B_{6}	1975.533												
74	94	a♯′′′/b♭′′′	A♯_{6}/B♭_{6}	1864.655												
73	93	a′′′	A_{6}	**1760.000**												
72	92	g♯′′′/a♭′′′	G♯_{6}/A♭_{6}	1661.219												
71	91	g′′′	G_{6}	1567.982												
70	90	f♯′′′/g♭′′′	F♯_{6}/G♭_{6}	1479.978												
69	89	f′′′	F_{6}	1396.913												
68	88	e′′′	E_{6}	1318.510												
67	87	d♯′′′/e♭′′′	D♯_{6}/E♭_{6}	1244.508												
66	86	d′′′	D_{6}	1174.659												
65	85	c♯′′′/d♭′′′	C♯_{6}/D♭_{6}	1108.731												
64	84	c′′′ 3-line octave	C_{6} Soprano C (High C)	1046.502												
63	83	b′′	B_{5}	987.7666												
62	82	a♯′′/b♭′′	A♯_{5}/B♭_{5}	932.3275												
61	81	a′′	A_{5}	**880.0000**												
60	80	g♯′′/a♭′′	G♯_{5}/A♭_{5}	830.6094												
59	79	g′′	G_{5}	783.9909												
58	78	f♯′′/g♭′′	F♯_{5}/G♭_{5}	739.9888												
57	77	f′′	F_{5}	698.4565												
56	76	e′′	E_{5}	659.2551	E	E (5 string)										
55	75	d♯′′/e♭′′	D♯_{5}/E♭_{5}	622.2540												
54	74	d′′	D_{5}	587.3295												
53	73	c♯′′/d♭′′	C♯_{5}/D♭_{5}	554.3653												
52	72	c′′ 2-line octave	C_{5} Tenor C	523.2511												
51	71	b′	B_{4}	493.8833					High B (12 string, optional)							
50	70	a♯′/b♭′	A♯_{4}/B♭_{4}	466.1638												
49	69	a′	A_{4} A440	**440.0000**	A	A			High A (optional)	A						
48	68	g♯′/a♭′	G♯_{4}/A♭_{4}	415.3047				High A♭ (12 single string)								
47	67	g′	G_{4}	391.9954						High G						
46	66	f♯′/g♭′	F♯_{4}/G♭_{4}	369.9944												
45	65	f′	F_{4}	349.2282												
44	64	e′	E_{4}	329.6276			High E (5 string)		High E	E						
43	63	d♯′/e♭′	D♯_{4}/E♭_{4}	311.1270				High E♭ (12 single string)								
42	62	d′	D_{4}	293.6648	D	D										
41	61	c♯′/d♭′	C♯_{4}/D♭_{4}	277.1826												
40	60	c′ 1-line octave	C_{4} Middle C	261.6256						C						
39	59	b	B_{3}	246.9417					B							
38	58	a♯/b♭	A♯_{3}/B♭_{3}	233.0819												
37	57	a	A_{3}	**220.0000**			A									
36	56	g♯/a♭	G♯_{3}/A♭_{3}	207.6523												
35	55	g	G_{3}	195.9977	G	G			G	Low G						
34	54	f♯/g♭	F♯_{3}/G♭_{3}	184.9972												
33	53	f	F_{3}	174.6141				High F (7 string)								
32	52	e	E_{3}	164.8138				High E (5th tuning, 5 string)								
31	51	d♯/e♭	D♯_{3}/E♭_{3}	155.5635												
30	50	d	D_{3}	146.8324			D		D							
29	49	c♯/d♭	C♯_{3}/D♭_{3}	138.5913												
28	48	c small octave	C_{3}	130.8128	C (5 string)	C		C (6 string)								
27	47	B	B_{2}	123.4708												
26	46	A♯/B♭	A♯_{2}/B♭_{2}	116.5409												
25	45	A	A_{2}	**110.0000**				A (5th tuning upright)	A							
24	44	G♯/A♭	G♯_{2}/A♭_{2}	103.8262												
23	43	G	G_{2}	97.99886			G	G								
22	42	F♯/G♭	F♯_{2}/G♭_{2}	92.49861												
21	41	F	F_{2}	87.30706	Low F (6 string)	Low F (6 string)										
20	40	E	E_{2}	82.40689					Low E							
19	39	D♯/E♭	D♯_{2}/E♭_{2}	77.78175												
18	38	D	D_{2}	73.41619				D								
17	37	C♯/D♭	C♯_{2}/D♭_{2}	69.29566												
16	36	C great octave	C_{2} Deep C	65.40639			C									
15	35	B͵	B_{1}	61.73541					Low B (7 string)							
14	34	A♯͵/B♭͵	A♯_{1}/B♭_{1}	58.27047												
13	33	A͵	A_{1}	**55.00000**				A								
12	32	G♯͵/A♭͵	G♯_{1}/A♭_{1}	51.91309												
11	31	G͵	G_{1}	48.99943				G (5th tuning upright)								
10	30	F♯͵/G♭͵	F♯_{1}/G♭_{1}	46.24930					Low F♯ (8 string)							
9	29	F͵	F_{1}	43.65353			Low F (6 string)									
8	28	E͵	E_{1}	41.20344				E								
7	27	D♯͵/E♭͵	D♯_{1}/E♭_{1}	38.89087												
6	26	D͵	D_{1}	36.70810												
5	25	C♯͵/D♭͵	C♯_{1}/D♭_{1}	34.64783					Low C♯ (9 string)							
4	24	C͵ contra-octave	C_{1} Pedal C	32.70320				C (upright extension or 5th tuning)								
3	23	B͵͵	B_{0}	30.86771				B (5 string)								
2	22	A♯͵͵/B♭͵͵	A♯_{0}/B♭_{0}	29.13524												
1	21	A͵͵	A_{0}	**27.50000**												
0	20	G♯͵͵/A♭͵͵	G♯_{0}/A♭_{0}	25.95654					Low G♯ (10 string)							
−1	19	G͵͵	G_{0}	24.49971												
−2	18	F♯͵͵/G♭͵͵	F♯_{0}/G♭_{0}	23.12465												
−3	17	F͵͵	F_{0}	21.82676												
−4	16	E͵͵	E_{0}	20.60172												
−5	15	D♯͵͵/E♭͵͵	D♯_{0}/E♭_{0}	19.44544												
−6	14	D͵͵	D_{0}	18.35405												
−7	13	C♯͵͵/D♭͵͵	C♯_{0}/D♭_{0}	17.32391												
−8	12	C͵͵ sub-contra-octave	C_{0} Double Pedal C	16.35160												
−9	11	B͵͵͵	B_{−1}	15.43385												
−10	10	A♯͵͵͵/B♭͵͵͵	A♯_{−1}/B♭_{−1}	14.56762												
−11	9	A͵͵͵	A_{−1}	**13.75000**												

== See also ==
- Piano tuning
- Scientific pitch notation
- Music and mathematics
