= The Acoustic EP =

The Acoustic EP may refer to:

- Against Me! (2001 EP), an EP by Against Me!, also known as The Acoustic EP
- The Acoustic EP (The Early November EP), 2002
- The Acoustics (EP), by Vassy

== See also ==
- Acoustic (disambiguation)
- Acoustics (disambiguation)
