= Acústico =

Acústico (Spanish "acoustic") may refer to:

== Music ==
- Acústico (Ednita Nazario album), 2002
- Acústico (La 5ª Estación album), 2005
- En Acústico, a 2011 album by Pablo Alborán

== See also ==
- Acústico Vol. II, 2002 album by Ednita Nazario
- Acustica (disambiguation)
- Acoustic (disambiguation)
