= Acústica =

Acústica may refer to:

- Antologia Acústica, acoustic compilation album by Brazilian solo artist Zé Ramalho
- Tracción Acústica, the tenth album of Enanitos Verdes published in 1998
- Versão Acústica, Brazilian acoustic rock band formed by Emmerson Nogueira
- Versão Acústica (album), the first album by Brazilian acoustic rock musician Emmerson Nogueira
- Versão Acústica 2, the second album by Brazilian Acoustic rock musician Emmerson Nogueira
- Versão Acústica 3, the third album by Brazilian Acoustic rock musician Emmerson Nogueira

== See also ==
- Acústico (disambiguation)
- Acoustica (disambiguation)
- Acoustic (disambiguation)
