= Clavinova =

Product line of digital pianos

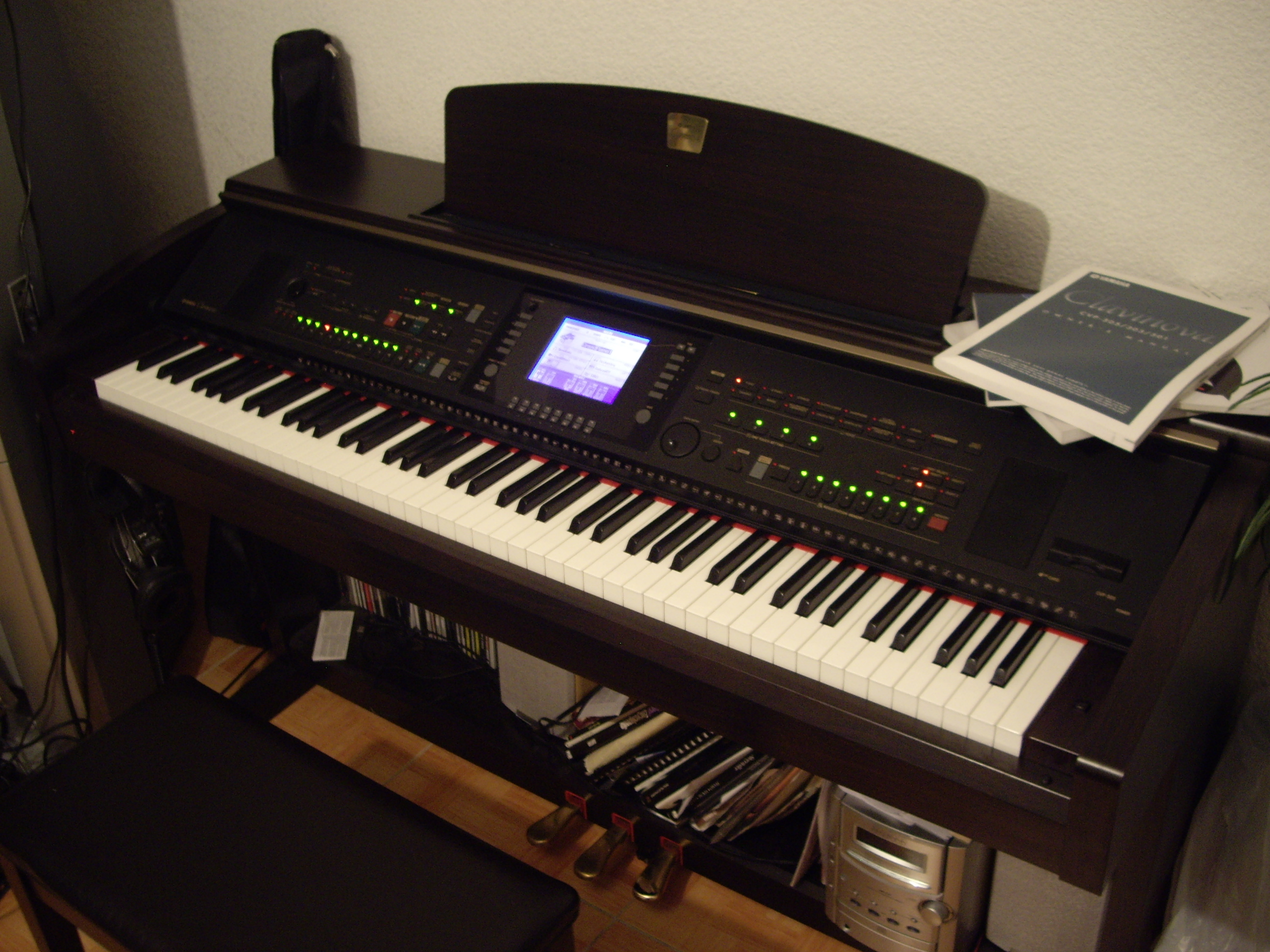
Clavinova CVP-303 Player Piano

The Clavinova is a long-running line of digital pianos created by the Yamaha Corporation. The name is a portmanteau of the two words Clavier meaning 'keyboard instrument” and nova meaning “new”.

It is similar in function to an acoustic piano but also includes many features common to various electronic keyboards, such as the ability to save/load songs and to play demo songs, including original Yamaha compositions, and the ability to play in a variety of voices. More recent models can be connected to a computer via USB or wireless network for music production or interactive piano lesson programs.

In 2023, the Clavinova celebrated the 40th anniversary of its debut in 1983.

== Technical information ==
All current (and many past) Clavinovas (CLP and CVP-Series) feature Yamaha's “Graded Hammer” technology, a mechanical system of small metal hammers, weighted to be similar to those of an acoustic piano. These then activate a digital pressure sensor that then translates into sound. The graded action is intended to reproduce more accurately the varying weights of the hammers of an acoustic piano where the hammers vary in weight from the bass section to the treble. Higher-end models, such as the CVP-600 Series from 2012, incorporate real wooden keys and linear grading for added realism.

The built-in synthesizer produces the sound. Early Clavinova models used FM synthesis. Later models use sample-based synthesis to produce the sound. Information comes in a MIDI or similar format either directly from the piano keyboard or a stored source (from within the piano or via a computer or external sequencer). The synthesizer can imitate a large array of acoustic instruments, electronic instruments and other sound effects. Recent models of CVP Clavinova have hundreds of such voices. These usually include many types of pianos and organs, string, percussion, brass and woodwind instruments, as well as modern and vintage synthesizer sounds, sampled effects etc. The more recent CVP models also feature many accompaniment styles, ranging from traditional dance and classical orchestration to more modern club, pop, rock, big band and jazz styles.

As of July 2020, the current line of Clavinova CLP models is the CLP-700 series, and the current Clavinova CVP models are the CVP-800 series. In August 2017, Yamaha introduced a new line of tablet computer-enabled Clavinovas, the CSP series, which is designed for use with Yamaha's SmartPianist app to access and control features of the instrument.

== Graded hammer ==
The various graded or progressively weighted keys are:

- Graded Hammer Standard (GHS), formerly Hammer Effect (HE) or Action Effect (AE)
- Graded Hammer (GH or sometimes GHE), somewhat heavier than GHS. GH is also closer to the weight of real piano keys.
- Graded Hammer 3 (GH3), like GH, but GH3 incorporate a third sensor, thus making the key respond more like "grand piano" behaviour. GH3 allows the player to trigger the sound when depressed a second time, even when the note is still decaying, and the player has not completely released the key after the first push of the key. This makes some techniques such as a soft legato "trill" easier to execute.
- Graded Hammer 3X (GH3X) keyboard features an "escapement" mechanism that reproduces a slight clicking sensation near the bottom of the key travel. It has been designed in such a way that the click is discernible only on the lightest keystrokes, similar to the keyboard of a grand piano.
- Natural Wood (NW) is graded like the GH3 but also uses spruce wood to make the feeling even closer to that of the acoustic grand piano.
- Natural Wood X (NWX) provides the keys of the NW keyboard, yet also has escapement, giving an even more accurate feel.
- GrandTouch Keyboard has a longer key length. The longer distance between the edge of the key and its pivot point means that it requires less strength to push down.
- 88-key Linear Graded Hammers provide 88 levels of gradation (each key has its own weight). With NWX, it has the most accurate feel of any of the Clavinovas, although also found on some NW keyboards.

== Keyboard "feel" feature matrix for current models ==
From Yamaha Clavinova microsite. From Yamaha Product Spec page.

Clavinova Series/Model	GrandTouch Keyboard	Graded Hammer 3 (GH3)	Natural Wood Keyboard (NW)	Synthetic Ivory Keytops	88-key Linear Graded Hammers	Escapement	Counterweighted
CLP Series
CLP-150	No	No	No	No	Yes	No	No
CLP-170	No	Yes	No	No	No	No	No
CLP-230	No	Yes	No	No	No	No	No
CLP-240	No	Yes	No	No	No	No	No
CLP-270	No	Yes	No	No	No	No	No
CLP-280	No	Yes	Yes	No	No	No	No
CLP-S306	No	Yes	No	Yes	No	No	No
CLP-S308	No	Yes	Yes	Yes	No	No	No
CLP-320	No	No	No	No	No	No	No
CLP-330	No	Yes	No	No	No	No	No
CLP-340	No	Yes	No	Yes	No	No	No
CLP-370	No	Yes	Yes	Yes	No	No	No
CLP-380	No	Yes	Yes	Yes	No	No	No
CLP-430	No	Yes	No	No	No	No	No
CLP-440	No	Yes	No	Yes	No	No	No
CLP-465GP	No	Yes	No	No	No	No	No
CLP-470	No	Yes	Yes	Yes	Yes	No	No
CLP-480	No	Yes	Yes	Yes	Yes	No	No
CLP-S406	No	Yes	No	Yes	No	No	No
CLP-S408	No	Yes	Yes	Yes	Yes	No	No
CLP-525	No	Yes	No	Yes	No	No	No
CLP-535	No	Yes	No	Yes	No	Yes	No
CLP-545	No	Yes	Yes	Yes	No	Yes	No
CLP-565GP	No	Yes	No	Yes	No	Yes	No
CLP-575	No	Yes	Yes	Yes	Yes	Yes	No
CLP-585	No	Yes	Yes	Yes	Yes	Yes	Yes
CLP-625	No	Yes	No	Yes	No	Yes	No
CLP-635	No	Yes	No	Yes	No	Yes	No
CLP-645	No	Yes	Yes	Yes	No	Yes	No
CLP-665GP	No	Yes	No	Yes	No	Yes	No
CLP-675	Yes	No	Yes	Yes	Yes	Yes	No
CLP-685	Yes	No	Yes	Yes	Yes	Yes	Yes
CLP-695GP	Yes	No	Yes	Yes	Yes	Yes	Yes
CLP-725	Yes	No	No	Yes	No	Yes	No
CLP-735	Yes	No	No	Yes	No	Yes	No
CLP-745	Yes	No	Yes	Yes	No	Yes	No
CLP-765GP	Yes	No	No	Yes	No	Yes	No
CLP-775	Yes	No	Yes	Yes	Yes	Yes	No
CLP-785	Yes	No	Yes	Yes	Yes	Yes	Yes
CLP-795GP	Yes	No	Yes	Yes	Yes	Yes	Yes
Clavinova Series/Model	GrandTouch Keyboard	Graded Hammer 3 (GH3)	Natural Wood Keyboard (NW)	Synthetic Ivory Keytops	88-key Linear Graded Hammers	Escapement	Counterweighted
CVP Series
CVP-305	No	Yes	No	No	No	No	No
CVP-307	No	Yes	No	No	No	No	No
CVP-309	No	Yes	Yes	No	No	No	No
CVP-401	No	No	No	No	No	No	No
CVP-403	No	Yes	No	No	No	No	No
CVP-405	No	Yes	No	No	No	No	No
CVP-407	No	Yes	Yes	No	Yes	No	No
CVP-409	No	Yes	Yes	Yes	No	No	No
CVP-409GP	No	Yes	Yes	Yes	No	No	No
CGP-1000	No	Yes	Yes	Yes	Yes	No	No
CVP-501	No	Yes	No	No	No	No	No
CVP-503	No	Yes	No	No	No	No	No
CVP-505	No	Yes	No	No	No	No	No
CVP-509	No	Yes	Yes	Yes	Yes	No	No
CVP-601	No	Yes	No	No	No	No	No
CVP-605	No	Yes	No	Yes	No	No	No
CVP-609	No	Yes	Yes	Yes	Yes	No	No
CVP-609GP	No	Yes	Yes	Yes	Yes	No	No
CVP-701	No	Yes	No	Yes	No	Yes	No
CVP-705	No	Yes	Yes	Yes	Yes	Yes	No
CVP-709	No	Yes	Yes	Yes	Yes	Yes	Yes
CVP-709GP	No	Yes	Yes	Yes	Yes	Yes	Yes
CVP-805	Yes	No	No	Yes	Yes	Yes	No
CVP-809	Yes	No	No	Yes	Yes	Yes	Yes
CVP-809GP	Yes	No	No	Yes	Yes	Yes	Yes
Clavinova Series/Model	GrandTouch Keyboard	Graded Hammer 3 (GH3)	Natural Wood Keyboard (NW)	Synthetic Ivory Keytops	88-key Linear Graded Hammers	Escapement	Counterweighted
CSP Series
CSP-150	No	Yes	No	Yes	No	Yes	No
CSP-170	No	Yes	Yes	Yes	No	Yes	No

== Tone feature matrix for three past generations and current models ==
From Yamaha Clavinova microsite. From Clavinova Spec page.

Clavinova Series/Model	AWM Sampling	CF Sampling	CF-RGE Sampling	CFX-RGE Sampling	Half-damper	Key-Off Samples	String Resonance	VRM	iAFC Effect	IAC	Tri-Amped	Quad-Amped
CLP Series												
CLP-150	Yes	No	No	No	No	Yes	Yes	No	No	No	No	No
CLP-170	Yes	No	No	No	Yes	Yes	Yes	No	Yes	No	No	No
CLP-270	Yes	No	No	No	No	Yes	Yes	No	Yes	No	No	No
CLP-280	Yes	No	No	No	Yes	Yes	Yes	No	Yes	No	No	No
CLP-265GP	Yes	No	No	No	Yes	No	No	No	No	No	No	No
CLP-295GP	Yes	No	No	No	Yes	Yes	No	No	Yes	No	No	No
CLP-320	No	3 level	No	No	Yes	No	No	No	No	No	No	No
CLP-330	No	3 level	No	No	Yes	No	No	No	No	No	No	No
CLP-340	No	4 level	No	No	Yes	Yes	Yes	No	No	No	No	No
CLP-370	No	4 level	No	No	Yes	Yes	Yes	No	No	No	No	No
CLP-380	No	5 level	No	No	Yes	Yes	Yes	No	Yes	No	Yes	No
CLP-S306	No	3 level	No	No	Yes	No	No	No	No	No	No	No
CLP-S308	No	4 level	No	No	Yes	No	Yes	No	No	No	No	No
CLP-430	No	No	Yes	No	Yes	Yes	Yes	No	No	Yes	No	No
CLP-440	No	No	Yes	No	Yes	Yes	Yes	No	No	Yes	No	No
CLP-S406	No	No	Yes	No	Yes	Yes	Yes	No	No	Yes	No	No
CLP-465GP	No	No	Yes	No	Yes	Yes	No	No	No	Yes	No	No
CLP-470	No	No	Yes	No	Yes	Yes	Yes	No	Yes	Yes	No	No
CLP-480	No	No	Yes	No	Yes	Yes	Yes	No	Yes	Yes	Yes	No
CLP-S408	No	No	Yes	No	Yes	Yes	Yes	No	No	Yes	No	No
CLP-525	No	No	Yes	No	Yes	Yes	No	No	No	Yes	No	No
CLP-535	No	No	No	Yes	Yes	Yes	Yes	No	No	Yes	No	No
CLP-545	No	No	No	Yes	Yes	Yes	Yes	No	No	Yes	No	No
CLP-565GP	No	No	No	Yes	Yes	Yes	Yes	No	No	Yes	No	No
CLP-575	No	No	No	Yes	Yes	Yes	Yes	Yes	No	Yes	No	No
CLP-585	No	No	No	Yes	Yes	Yes	Yes	Yes	No	Yes	Yes	No
Clavinova Series/Model	AWM Sampling	CF Sampling	CF-RGE Sampling	CFX-RGE Sampling	Half-damper	Key-Off Samples	String Resonance	VRM	iAFC Effect	IAC	Tri-Amped	Quad-Amped
CVP Series												
CVP-307	Yes	No	No	No	No	Yes	Yes	No	Yes	No	No	No
CVP-309	Yes	No	No	No	Yes	Yes	Yes	No	Yes	No	No	No
CVP-401	Yes	3 level	No	No	Yes	Yes	No	No	No	No	No	No
CVP-403	No	3 level	No	No	Yes	Yes	No	No	No	No	No	No
CVP-405	No	3 level	No	No	Yes	Yes	No	No	No	No	No	No
CVP-407	No	4 level	No	No	Yes	Yes	Yes	No	Yes	No	No	No
CVP-409	No	4 level	No	No	Yes	Yes	Yes	No	Yes	No	No	No
CVP-409GP	No	4 level	No	No	Yes	Yes	Yes	No	Yes	No	No	No
CGP-1000	No	4 level	No	No	Yes	Yes	Yes	No	Yes	No	No	No
CVP-501	No	3 level	No	No	Yes	Yes	No	No	No	No	No	No
CVP-503	No	4 level	No	No	Yes	Yes	No	No	No	No	No	No
CVP-505	No	4 level	No	No	Yes	Yes	No	No	No	No	No	No
CVP-509	No	5 level	No	No	Yes	Yes	Yes	No	No	No	Yes	No
CVP-601	No	No	Yes	No	Yes	Yes	Yes	No	No	Yes	No	No
CVP-605	No	No	Yes	No	Yes	Yes	Yes	No	No	Yes	No	No
CVP-609	No	No	Yes	No	Yes	Yes	Yes	No	No	Yes	Yes	No
CVP-609GP	No	No	Yes	No	Yes	Yes	Yes	No	No	Yes	Yes	No
CVP-701	No	No	No	Yes	Yes	Yes	Yes	Yes	No	Yes	No	No
CVP-705	No	No	No	Yes	Yes	Yes	Yes	Yes	No	Yes	No	No
CVP-709	No	No	No	Yes	Yes	Yes	Yes	Yes	No	Yes	No	Yes
CVP-709GP	No	No	No	Yes	Yes	Yes	Yes	Yes	No	Yes	No	Yes

== History ==
Clavinovas and their immediate predecessors have been in production since 1983.

=== Predecessors (YP and CV) ===
==== YP (CLP Predecessor) ====
- 1983: YP-10, YP-20, YP-30, YP-40 – provided the "Stereo Symphonic effect" showing depth feeling to perform in concert halls and live houses, first pianos on the series.

==== CV (CLP Predecessor) ====
- 1984: CV-100, CV-300

=== CVP and CGP models ===
- 1985: CVP-3, CVP-5, CVP-7 – First CVP series Clavinova
- 1987: CVP-6, CVP-8, CVP-10, CVP-100MA, CVP-100PE
- 1988: CVP-20
- 1989: CVP-30, CVP-50, CVP-70
- 1991: CVP-25*, CVP-35, CVP-45, CVP-55, CVP-65, CVP-75
- 1993: CVP-83, CVP-85, CVP-87, CVP-89
- 1995: CVP-49, CVP-59, CVP-69, CVP-79 – added LCD on all models except CVP-49, and introduced LCD buttons.
- 1997: CVP-92, CVP-94, CVP-96, CVP-98, CVP-555 – First modern design button LCD, Organ Combo (predecessor to Organ Flutes! voices). Based on the PSR-8000 and PSR-740.
- 1998: CVP-600
- 1999: CVP-103, CVP-105, CVP-107, CVP-109. Based on PSR-740 and PSR-9000.
- 2000: CVP-700
- 2001: CVP-201, CVP-203, CVP-205, CVP-207, CVP-209 – Introduced most of the current technologies, added first color display, and with the latest button setup. Based on PSR-9000, 9000 Pro and PSR-2100.
- 2002: CVP-900
- 2003: CVP-202, CVP-204, CVP-206, CVP-208, CVP-210. Based on PSR-2100.
- 2004: CVP-301, CVP-303, CVP-305, CVP-309, CVP-307, CVP-309, CVP-309GP – All models have current button display, first GH3 and NW keyboards. Added Mega Voices and based on Tyros/PSR-3000.
- 2007: CGP-1000
- 2007: CVP-401, CVP-403, CVP-405, CVP-407, CVP-409, CVP-409GP – Added Super Articulation, based on Tyros 2/PSR-S900.
- 2009: CVP-501, CVP-503, CVP-505, CVP-509, CVP-509GP – Introduced several new keyboard technologies, added S. Articulation 2. Added free play styles. Based on Tyros 3/PSR-S910.
- 2012: CVP-601, CVP-605, CVP-609, CVP-609GP – All models have S. Articulation and GH3, added touch screen and RGE sound engine. Based on Tyros 4/PSR-S950.
- 2015: CVP-701, CVP-705, CVP-709, CVP-709GP – All models have color displays and synthetic ivory keycaps. Added VRM sound engine and escapement. Based on Tyros 5/PSR-S970.
- 2019: CVP-805, CVP-809, CVP-809GP. Based on Genos/PSR-SX900, with green lamp inside style control, registrations, and one touch settings buttons.
- 2023: CVP-905, CVP-909, CVP-909GP. Based on Genos/PSR-SX900, with blue lamp inside style control, registrations, and one touch settings buttons.

=== CLP models ===
History reference.

- 1985: CLP-20, CLP-30
- 1986: CLP-40, CLP-45, CLP-50, CLP-55, CLP-200, CLP-300
- 1987: CLP-100, CLP-100MA, CLP-100PE, CLP-500
- 1988: CLP-250, CLP-350, CLP-550, CLP-650
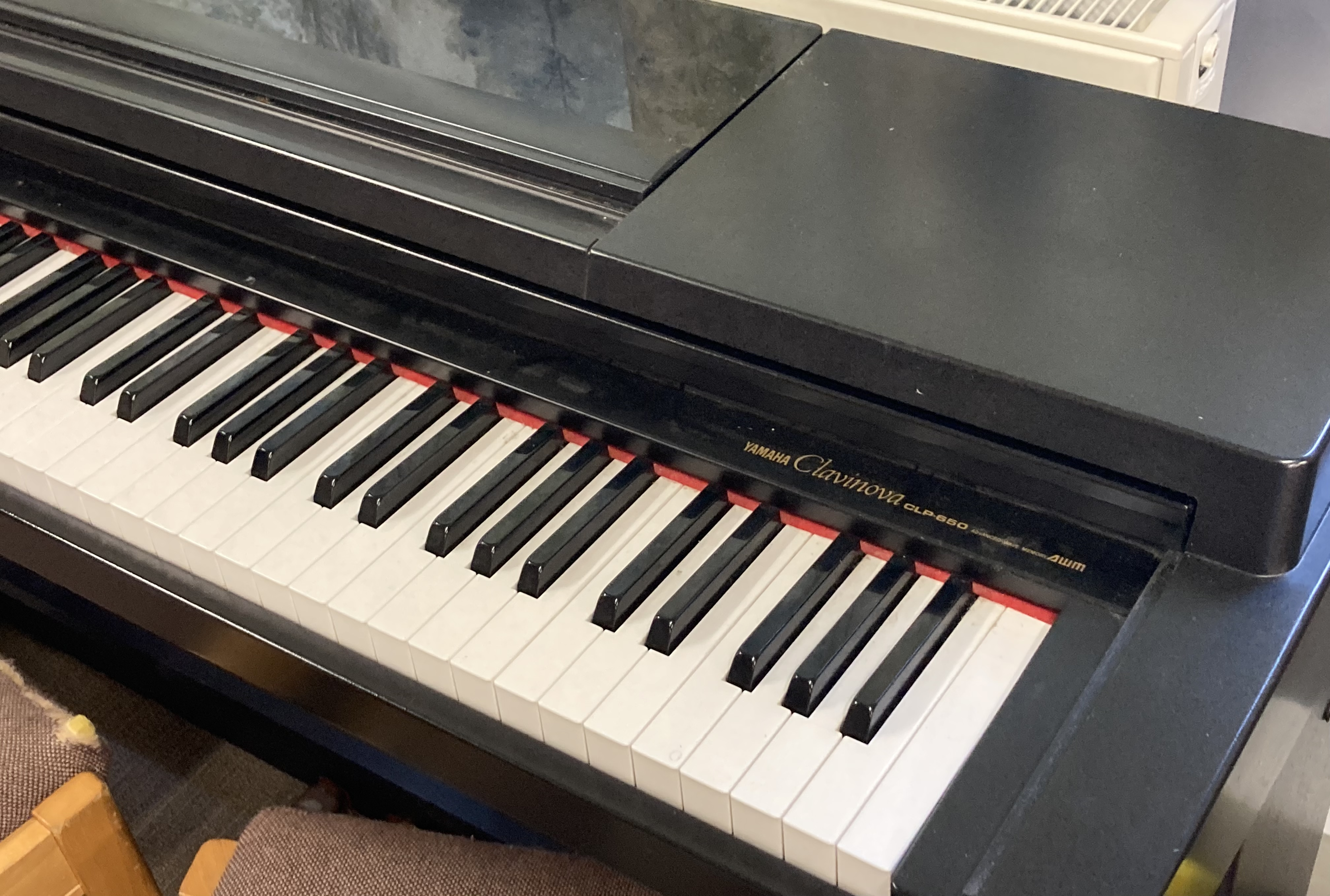
  A picture of the CLP-650
- 1989: CLP-570, CLP-650W, CLP-670
- 1990: CLP-260, CLP-360, CLP-560, CLP-760
- 1992: CLP-121, CLP-122, CLP-123, CLP-124
- 1994: CLP-152S, CLP-153S, CLP-153SG, CLP-154S, CLP-155, CLP-157
- 1996: CLP-311, CLP-411, CLP-511, CLP-611, CLP-811, CLP-911
- 1997: CLP-555
- 1998: CLP-810, CLP-820, CLP-840, CLP-860, CLP-880
- 2000: CLP-920, CLP-930, CLP-950, CLP-955, CLP-970, CLP-970A
- 2001: CLP-910, CLP-990
- 2002: CLP-110, CLP-120, CLP-130, CLP-150, CLP-170
- 2003: CLP-115
- 2005: CLP-F01
- 2005: CLP-220, CLP-230, CLP-240, CLP-270, CLP-280, CLP-265GP, CLP-295GP
- 2008: CLP-320, CLP-330, CLP-340, CLP-370, CLP-380, CLP-S306, CLP-S308
- 2011: CLP-430, CLP-440, CLP-465GP, CLP-470, CLP-480, CLP-S406, CLP-S408 - Implemented RGE Sound Engine
- 2014: CLP-525, CLP-535, CLP-545, CLP-565GP, CLP-575, CLP-585 - Revised LCD, added VRM
- 2017: CLP-625, CLP-635, CLP-645, CLP-665GP, CLP-675, CLP-685
- 2018: CLP-695GP
- 2020: CLP-735, CLP-745, CLP-765GP, CLP-775, CLP-785, CLP-795GP
- 2021: CLP-725
- 2024: CLP-825, CLP-835, CLP-845, CLP-865GP, CLP-875, CLP-885, CLP-895GP

=== CSP models ===
- 2017: CSP-150, CSP-170
- 2023: CSP-255, CSP-275, CSP-295, CSP-295GP

== See also ==
- Piano acoustics
