= Pseudo-octave =

Musical interval which is not a perfect harmonic

Pseudo Octave
Pseudo Octave

Perfect Octave
Perfect Octave

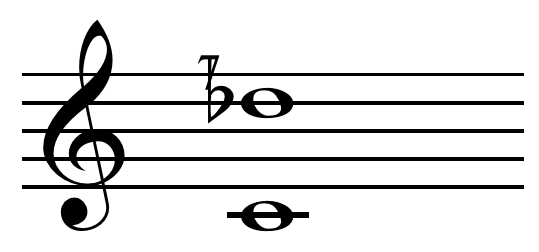
Pseudo-octave (2.1:1)

In music theory, a pseudo-octave, pseudooctave, or paradoxical octave is an interval whose ratio of frequencies is not exactly the 2:1 = octave:tonic expected for perfectly harmonic pitches, but slightly wider or narrower in pitch – for example 1.98:1, 2.01:1, or even as large as 2.3:1. The pseudo-octave is nevertheless perceived as if it were equivalent to the conventional 2:1 harmonic ratio, and consequently is treated the same. Pitches separated by a pseudo-octave appropriate for a given instrument are considered equivalent to each other just as with normal "pitch classes" (which are typically explained only in terms of the idealized 2:1 octave).

== Stretched octave ==
The stretched octave, for example 2.01 : 1, rather than 2 : 1 (an 8.6 cent pitch difference), sounds out of tune when played with ideal harmonic overtones, but in tune when played with lower notes whose overtones are themselves naturally stretched by an equivalent amount.

In piano tuning, stretched octaves are commonly encountered in instruments where string thickness and high string tension causes some strings to approach their elastic limit, which makes the string respond to stretching and bending with a pull to restore its original shape and position a little out of proportion to how far it was bent or stretched. That non-linearity causes small differences between the string's real overtone frequencies and the mathematically ideal simple harmonic oscillator's integer multiple harmonics. The so-named "piano-tuners' octave" used to compensate for the non-harmonic partials is well approximated by the Railsback curve (which see).

The effect of strings' small inelastic response is that rather than the simple harmonics expected for its overtone series, which would all be integer multiples of the fundamental frequency, the timbre of the note that the string actually produces has slightly inharmonic overtones. In detailed discussions of pitch and tuning the actual overtones in the sounded note are called partial tones or partials, in order to avoid confusing them with the more familiar, mathematically simple integer harmonics; both are often relevant in the same sentence. Partials measured in the sounds produced by real musical instruments almost always have a slightly higher pitch than the corresponding idealized harmonic, with the discrepancy being less important for high-pitched instruments (above 5000 Hz) whose high-level overtones fall above the range of human hearing.

The practical consequence of the discrepancy between the sharpened pitches in a bass note's overtone series that treble notes must match, makes it necessary to widen every interval very slightly. Generally, it's more than sufficient to sharpen only whole octaves slightly, rather than separately modifying all intervals that reach individual pitches in the upper octaves (see stretched tuning).

The octaves of Balinese gamelans are never tuned 2:1, but instead are stretched or compressed in a consistent manner throughout the range of each individual gamelan, due to the physical characteristics of their instruments. Another example is the tritave of the Bohlen–Pierce scale (3:1).

Octave stretching is less apparent on large pianos which have longer strings and hence less curvature for a given displacement; that is one reason why orchestras go to the expense of using very long concert grand pianos rather than shorter, less expensive baby grand, upright, or spinet pianos. (Another reason is that long strings under high tension can store more acoustic energy than can short strings, making larger instruments louder (hence making a single piano better able to be perceived over the volume of an entire orchestra) and giving them longer sustain than similar, smaller instruments.)

== See also ==
- Electronic tuner
- Mel scale
- Octave band
- Piano acoustics § Railsback curve
