= Stretched tuning =

Detail of tuning of musical instruments

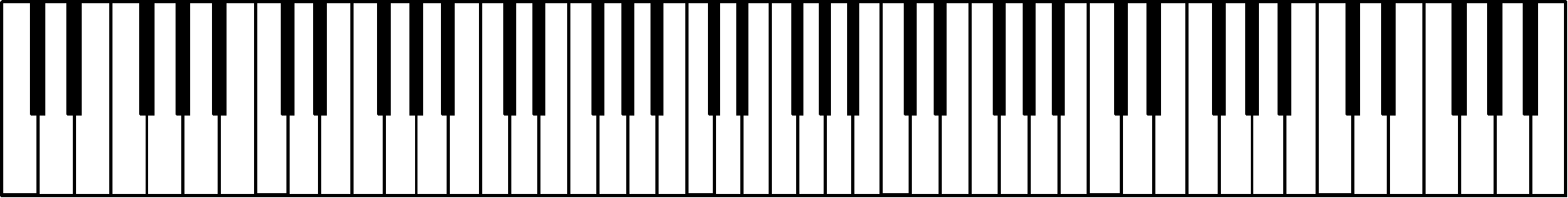
If the widths of the keys of a piano keyboard were stretched as the intervals between the corresponding notes are in stretched tuning, it would look something like the above.

Stretched tuning is a detail of musical tuning, applied to wire-stringed musical instruments, older, non-digital electric pianos (such as the Fender Rhodes piano and Wurlitzer electric piano), and some sample-based synthesizers based on these instruments, to accommodate the natural inharmonicity of their vibrating elements. In stretched tuning, two notes an octave apart, whose fundamental frequencies theoretically have an exact 2:1 ratio, are tuned slightly farther apart (a stretched octave). If the frequency ratios of octaves are greater than a factor of 2, the tuning is stretched; if smaller than a factor of 2, it is compressed."

Melodic stretch refers to tunings with fundamentals stretched relative to each other, while harmonic stretch refers to tunings with harmonics stretched relative to fundamentals which are not stretched. For example, the piano features both stretched harmonics and, to accommodate those, stretched fundamentals.

== Fundamentals and harmonics ==
In most musical instruments, the tone-generating component (a string or resonant column of air) vibrates at many frequencies simultaneously: a fundamental frequency that is usually perceived as the pitch of the note, and harmonics or overtones that are multiples of the fundamental frequency and whose wavelengths therefore divide the tone-generating region into simple fractional segments (1/2, 1/3, 1/4, etc.). (See harmonic series.) The fundamental note and its harmonics sound together, and the amplitude relationships among them strongly affect the perceived tone or timbre of the instrument.

In the acoustic piano, harpsichord, and clavichord, the vibrating element is a metal wire or string; in many non-digital electric pianos, it is a tapered metal tine (Rhodes piano) or reed (Wurlitzer electric piano) with one end clamped and the other free to vibrate. Each note on the keyboard has its own separate vibrating element whose tension and/or length and weight determines its fundamental frequency or pitch. In electric pianos, the motion of the vibrating element is sensed by an electromagnetic pickup and amplified electronically.

== Intervals and inharmonicity ==
In tuning, the relationship between two notes (known musically as an interval) is determined by evaluating their common harmonics. For example, we say two notes are an octave apart when the fundamental frequency of the upper note exactly matches the second harmonic of the lower note. Theoretically, this means the fundamental frequency of the upper note is exactly twice that of the lower note, and we would assume that the second harmonic of the upper note will exactly match the fourth harmonic of the lower note.

On instruments strung with metal wire, however, neither of these assumptions is valid, and inharmonicity is the reason.

Inharmonicity refers to the difference between the theoretical and actual frequencies of the harmonics or overtones of a vibrating tine or string. The theoretical frequency of the second harmonic is twice the fundamental frequency, and of the third harmonic is three times the fundamental frequency, and so on. But on metal strings, tines, and reeds, the measured frequencies of those harmonics are slightly higher, and proportionately more so in the higher than in the lower harmonics. A digital emulation of these instruments must recreate this inharmonicity if it is to sound convincing.

The theory of temperaments in musical tuning do not normally take into account inharmonicity, which varies from instrument to instrument (and from string to string), but in practice the amount of inharmonicity present in a particular instrument will effect a modification to the theoretical temperament which is being applied to it.

== Vibration of wire strings ==
When a stretched wire string is excited into motion by plucking or striking, a complex wave travels outward to the ends of the string. As it travels outward, this initial impulse forces the wire out of its resting position all along its length. After the impulse has passed, each part of the wire immediately begins to return toward (and overshoot) its resting position, which means vibration has been induced. Meanwhile, the initial impulse is reflected at both ends of the string and travels back toward the center. On the way, it interacts with the various vibrations it induced on the initial pass, and these interactions reduce or cancel some components of the impulse wave and reinforce others. When the reflected impulses encounter each other, their interaction again cancels some components and reinforces others.

Within a few transits of the string, all these cancellations and reinforcements sort the vibration into an orderly set of waves that vibrate over 1/1, 1/2, 1/3, 1/4, 1/5, 1/6, etc. of the length of the string. These are the harmonics. As a rule, the amplitude of its vibration is less for higher harmonics than for lower, meaning that higher harmonics are softer—though the details of this differ from instrument to instrument. The exact combination of different harmonics and their amplitudes is a primary factor affecting the timbre or tone quality of a particular musical tone.

In an ideal plain string, vibration over half the string's length will be twice as fast as its fundamental vibration, vibration over a third will be three times as fast, and so on. In this kind of string, the only force acting to return any part of it to its resting position is the tension between the string's ends. Strings for low and mid-range tones, however, typically consist of a core that is wound with another, thinner piece of wire. This makes them naturally resistant to being bent, adding to the effect of string tension in returning a given part of the string toward its resting position; the result is a comparatively higher frequency of vibration of wound strings. Since rigidity is constant, its effect is greater for shorter wavelengths, i.e. in higher harmonics.

=== Tines and reeds ===
Tines and reeds differ from strings in that they are held at one end and free to vibrate at the other. The frequencies of their fundamental and harmonic vibrations are subject to the same inharmonicity as strings. However, because of the comparative thickness of the bars that terminate the tines in an electric piano, the larger (and stronger) vibrations tend to "see" termination points slightly deeper in the bar than do smaller, weaker vibrations. This enhances inharmonicity in tines.

== Effects on tuning ==
Inharmonicity alters harmonics beyond their theoretical frequencies. As the overtone series progresses, each partial becomes proportionally sharper. Thus, in our example of an octave, exactly matching the lowest common harmonic causes a slight amount of stretch; matching the next higher common harmonic causes a greater amount of stretch; and so on. If the interval is two octaves plus a fifth (the favored means of cross-checking the stretch of the upper treble of the piano), exactly matching the upper note to the sixth harmonic of the lowest requires great sophistication of octave stretch to make the lower individual octaves, its double and triple octaves, and their other intervallic relationships sound pure and balanced.

Solving such dilemmas is at the heart of precise tuning by ear, and all solutions involve some stretching of the higher notes upward and the lower notes downward from their theoretical frequencies. In shorter strings (such as on spinet pianos), the wire stiffness in the tenor and bass registers is proportionately high; this leads to a timbre which is generally poorer, due to the higher inharmonicity and octave stretch, creating significant compromises to what is considered acceptable tuning. On longer strings, such as on concert grand or even moderately sized grand pianos, this effect is greatly reduced. Online sources suggest that the total amount of "stretch" over the full range of a piano may be on the order of ±35 cents: this also appears in the empirical Railsback curve.

== See also ==
- Electronic tuner
- Piano acoustics
- Piano tuning

== Further information ==
- Five lectures on the acoustics of the piano
