= Acoustic Sessions =

Acoustic Sessions may refer to:

- Acoustic Sessions (Juke Kartel EP), 2010 EP by Juke Kartel
- Acoustic Sessions (Harem Scarem EP), 1991 EP by Harem Scarem
- Acoustic Sessions (Cascada album), acoustic album by Cascada
- Acoustic Sessions (Shinedown EP), 2014 EP by Shinedown
- Acoustic Session (Emmelie de Forest EP)

Bad Wolves: Acoustic Sessions (Live)

1. Killing Me Slowly (Live Acoustic)

== See also ==
- Acoustic (disambiguation)
