= Acoustica =

Acoustica may refer to:

- Acoustica: Alarm Will Sound Performs Aphex Twin, a 2005 album by Alarm Will Sound
- Acoustica (Scorpions album), a 2001 album by Scorpions
- Acoustica (Wolfgang album), a 2000 album by Filipino rock band Wolfgang
- Acoustica (Alex Lloyd album), a 2016 album by Australian singer-songwriter, Alex Lloyd
- Acoustica, Inc., developer of Mixcraft Studio, an audio workstation, MIDI sequencer, and virtual instrument host
- Acoustica (software), a digital audio editor

== See also ==
- Acoustic (disambiguation)
- Acustica (disambiguation)
