= Piano wire =

Material for piano strings

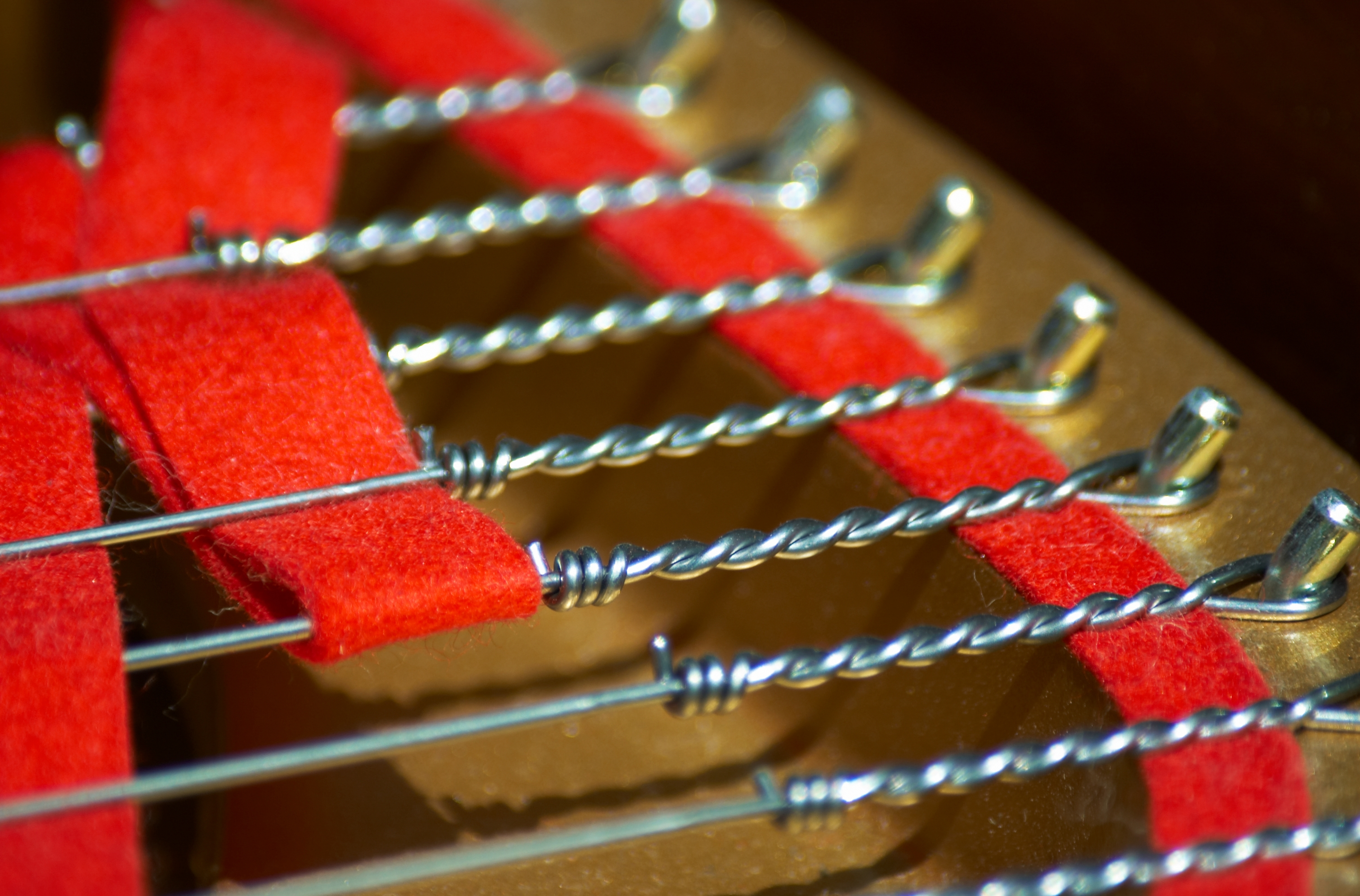
Piano string ends

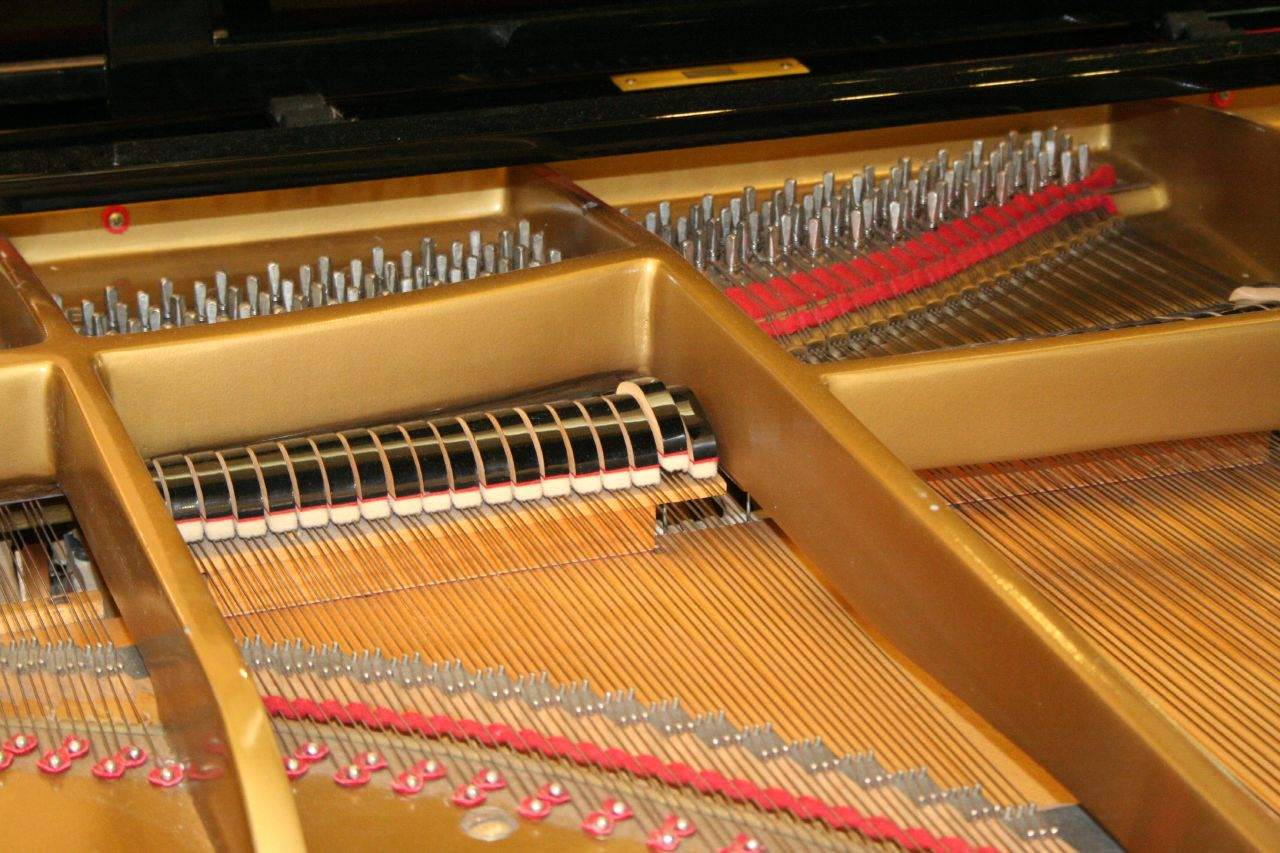
Piano strings

Piano wire, or "music wire", is a specialized type of wire made for use in piano strings but also in other applications as springs. It is made from tempered high-carbon steel, also known as spring steel, which replaced iron as the material starting in 1834.

Piano wire has a very high tensile strength to cope with the heavy demands of its primary role, allowing it to also be used in such varied purposes as fishing lures, surgicaly, and special effects.

== History ==
The oldest record of wire being made for musical instruments is from Augsburg in 1351.

Starting around 1800, the piano began to be built ever more ambitiously, with sturdier (eventually, iron) framing and greater string tension. This led to innovations in making tougher piano wire. In 1834, the Webster & Horsfal firm of Birmingham, United Kingdom brought out a form of piano wire made from cast steel; according to Dolge it was "so superior to the iron wire that the English firm soon had a monopoly." But a better steel wire was soon created in 1840 by the Viennese firm of Martin Miller, and a period of innovation and intense competition ensued, with rival brands of piano wire being tested against one another at international competitions, leading ultimately to the modern form of piano wire.

== Manufacture and use ==
The ASTM standard A228 covers the manufacture of steel wire for use in musical instruments, including pianos and guitars. This standard specifies a density of 7,850 kg/m³, a Poisson's ratio of 0.313, a Young's modulus of 207 GPa, a shear modulus of 80 GPa, and tensile strength ranges for a variety of diameters.

The tensile strength of one popular brand of piano wire is listed as 2620–2930 MPa (380–425 ksi).

== Piano wire sizes ==
Size	Diameter, inch	Diameter, mm
12	.029	0.74
12 1/2	.030	0.76
13	.031	0.79
13 1/2	.032	0.81
14	.033	0.84
14 1/2	.034	0.86
15	.035	0.89
15 1/2	.036	0.91
16	.037	0.94
16 1/2	.038	0.97
17	.039	0.99
17 1/2	.040	1.02
18	.041	1.04
18 1/2	.042	1.07
19	.043	1.09
19 1/2	.044	1.12
20	.045	1.14
21	.047	1.19
22	.049	1.25
23	.051	1.30

== Other applications ==
Piano wire is also used in the fabrication of springs, fishing lures, special effects in the movie industry, scaffold cross-bracing, orthodontic and pharyngeal surgery, and for the cutting of cheese and soap. It is also commonly used in hobby applications such as model railroading, both control line and radio-controlled aircraft, and knitting. It has also been employed by assassins as a garrote.

== See also ==
- Piano acoustics
- Wire wheel another application of high tensile strength wire
