= Acoustic EP =

Acoustic EP may refer to:

- Acoustic EP (Coldplay EP)
- Acoustic EP (3 Doors Down EP)
- Acoustic EP (10 Years EP), by 10 Years (band)
- Acoustic EP (Daphne Loves Derby EP)
- Acoustic EP (People in Planes EP)
- A bonus EP with the album 13 Ways to Bleed on Stage by Cold
- Against Me! (2001), a self-titled release by Against Me! also known as The Acoustic EP

== See also ==
- Acoustic (disambiguation)
