= Twelfth root of two =

Algebraic irrational number

Octaves (12 semitones) increase exponentially when measured on a linear frequency scale (Hz).

Octaves are equally spaced when measured on a logarithmic scale (cents).

The twelfth root of two or $\sqrt[12]{2}$ (or equivalently $2^{1/12}$) is an algebraic irrational number approximately equal to 1.0594631. It is important in Western music theory, where it represents the frequency ratio (musical interval) of a semitone in 12-tone equal temperament. This number was first proposed in relation to musical tuning in the 16th and 17th centuries. It allows measurement and comparison of different intervals (frequency ratios) as consisting of different numbers of a single interval, the equal-tempered semitone (for example, a minor third is 3 semitones, a major third is 4 semitones, and a perfect fifth is 7 semitones). (Note: "The smallest interval in an equal-tempered scale is the ratio $r^n=p$, so $r=\sqrt[n]p$, where the ratio r divides the ratio p (= 2/1 in an octave) into n equal parts.") Semitones are divided into 100 cents (1 cent = $\sqrt[1200]{2}=2^{1/1200}$).

== Numerical value ==
The twelfth root of two to 20 significant figures is 1.0594630943592952646. The continued fraction begins [1: 16, 1, 4, 2, 7, 1, 1, 2, 2, 7, 4, 1, 2, 1, ...], so a simple rational approximation is 18/17.

== The equal-tempered chromatic scale ==
A musical interval is a ratio of frequencies and the equal-tempered chromatic scale divides the octave (which has a ratio of 2:1) into 12 equal parts. Each note has a frequency that is 2^{1/12} times that of the one below it.

Applying this value successively to the tones of a chromatic scale, starting from A above middle C (known as A_{4}) with a frequency of 440 Hz, produces the following sequence of pitches:

Note	Standard interval name(s) relating to A 440	Frequency (Hz)	Multiplier	Coefficient (to six decimal places)	Just intonation ratio	Difference (± cents)
A	Unison	440.00	2^{0/12}	1.000000	1	0
A♯/B♭	Minor second/Half step/Semitone	466.16	2^{1/12}	1.059463	≈ 16/15	+11.73
B	Major second/Full step/Whole tone	493.88	2^{2/12}	1.122462	≈ 9/8	+3.91
C	Minor third	523.25	2^{3/12}	1.189207	≈ 6/5	+15.64
C♯/D♭	Major third	554.37	2^{4/12}	1.259921	≈ 5/4	−13.69
D	Perfect fourth	587.33	2^{5/12}	1.334839	≈ 4/3	−1.96
D♯/E♭	Augmented fourth/Diminished fifth/Tritone	622.25	2^{6/12}	1.414213	≈ 7/5	-17.49
E	Perfect fifth	659.26	2^{7/12}	1.498307	≈ 3/2	+1.96
F	Minor sixth	698.46	2^{8/12}	1.587401	≈ 8/5	+13.69
F♯/G♭	Major sixth	739.99	2^{9/12}	1.681792	≈ 5/3	−15.64
G	Minor seventh	783.99	2^{10/12}	1.781797	≈ 16/9	-3.91
G♯/A♭	Major seventh	830.61	2^{11/12}	1.887748	≈ 15/8	−11.73
A	Octave	880.00	2^{12/12}	2.000000	2	0

The final A (A_{5}: 880 Hz) is exactly twice the frequency of the lower A (A_{4}: 440 Hz), that is, one octave higher.

=== Other tuning scales ===
Other tuning scales use slightly different interval ratios:

- The just or Pythagorean perfect fifth is 3/2, and the difference between the equal-tempered perfect fifth and the just is a grad, the 12th root of the Pythagorean comma ($3 / 2^{19/12}$).
- The equal-tempered Bohlen–Pierce scale uses the interval of the 13th root of three ($\sqrt[13]{3}$).
- Stockhausen's Studie II (1954) makes use of the 25th root of five ($\sqrt[25]{5}$), a compound major third divided into 5×5 parts.
- The delta scale is based on ≈$\sqrt[50]{3/2}$.
- The gamma scale is based on ≈$\sqrt[20]{3/2}$.
- The beta scale is based on ≈$\sqrt[11]{3/2}$.
- The alpha scale is based on ≈$\sqrt[9]{3/2}$.

== Pitch adjustment ==
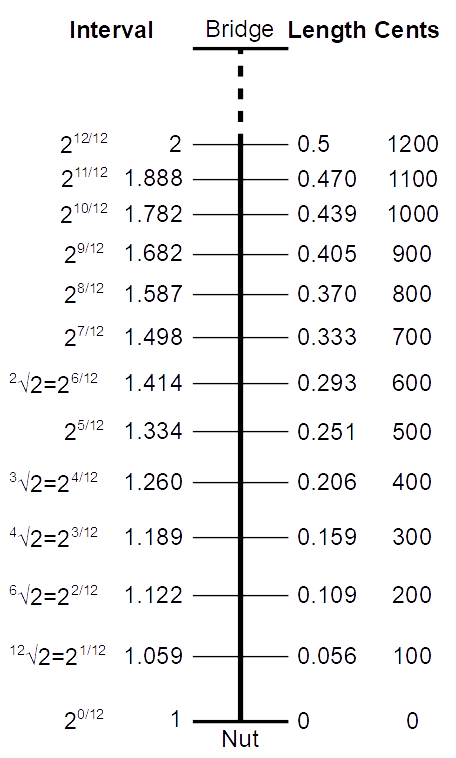
One octave of 12-tet on a monochord (linear)

The chromatic circle depicts equal distances between notes (logarithmic)

Since the frequency ratio of a semitone is close to 106% ($100\sqrt[12]{2} \approx 105.946$), increasing or decreasing the playback speed of a recording by 6% will shift the pitch up or down by about a semitone, or "half-step". Upscale reel-to-reel magnetic tape recorders typically have pitch adjustments of up to ±6%, generally used to match the playback or recording pitch to other music sources having slightly different tunings (or possibly recorded on equipment that was not running at quite the right speed). Modern recording studios utilize digital pitch shifting to achieve similar results, ranging from cents up to several half-steps. Reel-to-reel adjustments also affect the tempo of the recorded sound, while digital shifting does not.

== History ==
Historically this number was proposed for the first time in relation to musical tuning in 1580 (drafted, rewritten 1610) by Simon Stevin. Vincenzo Galilei may have been the first European to suggest 12-tone equal temperament, in 1581. The 12th root of two was first calculated in 1584 by the Chinese mathematician and musician Zhu Zaiyu using an abacus to reach 24 decimal places accurately, calculated circa 1605 by Flemish mathematician Simon Stevin, in 1636 by the French mathematician Marin Mersenne, and in 1691 by German musician Andreas Werckmeister.

== See also ==
- Fret
- Just intonation § Practical difficulties
- Music and mathematics
- Piano key frequencies
- Scientific pitch notation
- Twelve-tone technique
- The Well-Tempered Clavier
