= Acoustics (disambiguation) =

Acoustics is the interdisciplinary science that deals with the study of all mechanical waves in gases, liquids, and solids.

Acoustics may also refer to:

- Acoustics (Tony Rice album) (1979)
- Acoustics (Floater album) (2004)
- Acoustics (Minus the Bear EP) (2008)
- Acoustics (Lydia EP) (2012)
- Acoustics (This Century EP) (2012)

== See also ==
- Acoustic (disambiguation)
- Architectural acoustics
- Musical acoustics
