= Electronic tuner =

Device used to tune musical instruments

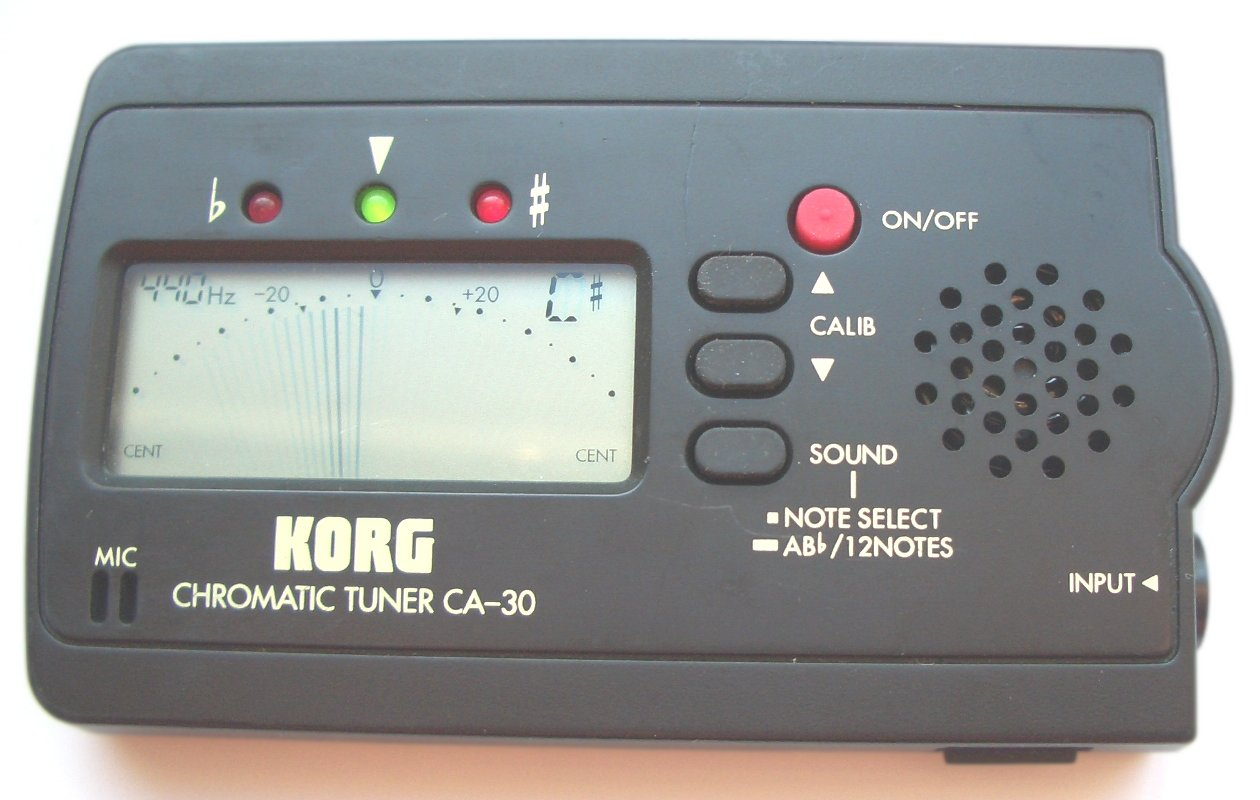
Pocket-sized Korg chromatic LCD tuner, with simulated analog indicator needle

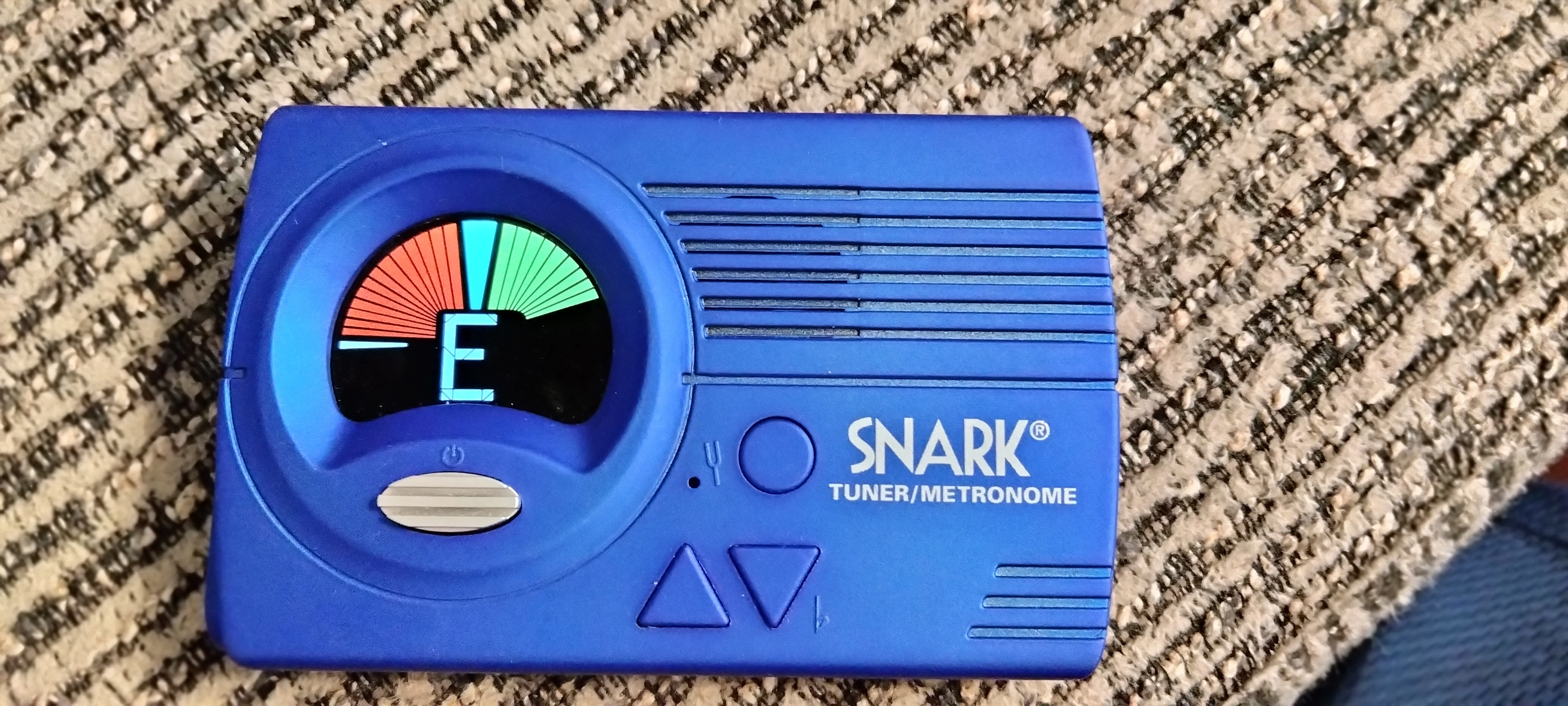
Guitar tuner showing that the "E" string is too sharp and needs to be tuned down

In music, an electronic tuner is a device that detects and displays the pitch of musical notes played on a musical instrument. "Pitch" is the perceived fundamental frequency of a musical note, which is typically measured in hertz. Simple tuners indicate—typically with an analog needle or dial, LEDs, or an LCD—whether a pitch is lower, higher, or equal to the desired pitch. Since the early 2010s, software applications can turn a smartphone, tablet, or personal computer into a tuner. More complex and expensive tuners indicate pitch more precisely. Tuners vary in size from units that fit in a pocket to 19" rack-mount units. Instrument technicians and piano tuners typically use more expensive, accurate tuners.

The simplest tuners detect and display tuning only for a single pitch—often "A" or "E"—or for a small number of pitches, such as the six used in the standard tuning of a guitar (E, A, D, G, B, E). More complex tuners offer chromatic tuning for all 12 pitches of the equally tempered octave. Some electronic tuners offer additional features, such as pitch calibration, temperament options, the sounding of a desired pitch through an amplifier plus speaker, and adjustable "read-time" settings that affect how long the tuner takes to measure the pitch of the note.

Among the most accurate tuning devices, strobe tuners work differently than regular electronic tuners. They are stroboscopes that flicker a light at the same frequency as the note. The light shines on a wheel that spins at a precise speed. The interaction of the light and regularly-spaced marks on the wheel creates a stroboscopic effect that makes the marks for a particular pitch appear to stand still when the pitch is in tune. These can tune instruments and audio devices more accurately than most non-strobe tuners. However, mechanical strobe units are expensive and delicate, and their moving parts require periodic servicing, so they are used mainly in applications that require higher precision, such as by professional instrument makers and repair experts.

== Regular types ==
Regular electronic tuners contain either an input jack for electric instruments (usually a 1/4-inch patch cord input), a microphone, or a clip-on sensor (e.g., a piezoelectric pickup) or some combination of these inputs. Pitch detection circuitry drives some type of display (an analog needle, an LCD simulated image of a needle, LED lights, or a spinning translucent disk illuminated by a strobing backlight). Some tuners have an output, or through-put, so the tuner can connect 'in-line' from an electric instrument to an instrument amplifier or mixing console. Small tuners are usually battery powered. Many battery-powered tuners also have a jack for an optional AC power supply.

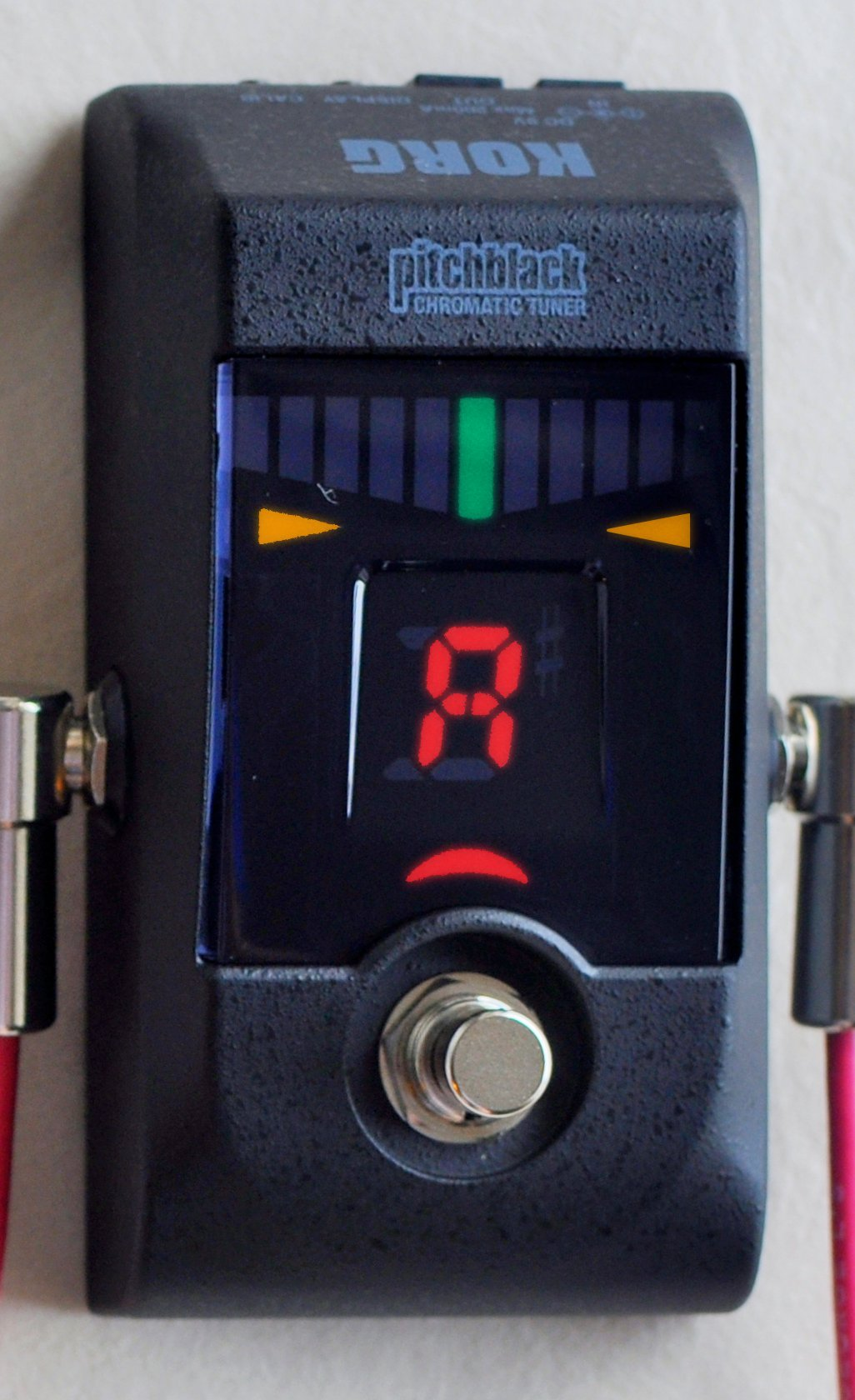
Some rock and pop guitarists and bassists use "stompbox" format electronic tuners that route the electric signal for the instrument through the unit via a 1/4-inch patch cable. These pedal-style tuners usually have an output so that the signal can be plugged into an amplifier.

Most musical instruments generate a fairly complex waveform with multiple related frequency components. The fundamental frequency is the pitch of the note. Additional "harmonics" (also called "partials" or "overtones") give each instrument its characteristic timbre. As well, this waveform changes during the duration of a note. This means that for non-strobe tuners to be accurate, the tuner must process a number of cycles and use the pitch average to drive its display. Background noise from other musicians or harmonic overtones from the musical instrument can impede the electronic tuner from "locking" onto the input frequency. This is why the needle or display on regular electronic tuners tends to waver when a pitch is played. Small movements of the needle, or LED, usually represent a tuning error of 1 cent. The typical accuracy of these types of tuners is around ±3 cents. Some inexpensive LED tuners may drift by as much as ±9 cents.

"Clip-on" tuners typically attach to instruments with a spring-loaded clip that has a built-in contact microphone. Clipped onto a guitar headstock or violin scroll, these sense pitch even in loud environments, for example when other people are tuning.

Some guitar tuners fit into the instrument itself. Typical of these are the Sabine AX3000 and the "NTune" device. The NTune consists of a switching potentiometer, a wiring harness, an illuminated plastic display disc, a circuit board and a battery holder. The unit installs in place of an electric guitar's existing volume knob control. The unit functions as a regular volume knob when not in tuner mode. To operate the tuner, the player pulls the volume knob up. The tuner disconnects the guitar's output so the tuning process is not amplified. The lights on the illuminated ring, under the volume knob, indicate the note being tuned. When the note is in tune a green "in tune" indicator light illuminates. After tuning is complete the musician pushes the volume knob back down, disconnecting the tuner from the circuit and re-connecting the pickups to the output jack.

Gibson guitars released a guitar model in 2008 called the Robot Guitar—a customized version of either the Les Paul or SG model. The guitar is fitted with a special tailpiece with in-built sensors that pick up the frequency of the strings. An illuminated control knob selects different tunings. Motorized tuning machines on the headstock automatically tune the guitar. In "intonation" mode, the device displays how much adjustment the bridge requires with a system of flashing LEDs on the control knob.

=== Regular needle, LCD and LED display tuners ===
A needle, LCD or regular LED type tuner uses a microprocessor to measure the average period of the waveform. It uses that information to drive the needle or array of lights. When the musician plays a single note, the tuner senses the pitch. The tuner then displays the pitch in relation to the desired pitch, and indicates whether the input pitch is lower, higher, or equal to the desired pitch. With needle displays, the note is in tune when the needle is in a 90° vertical position, with leftward or rightward deviations indicating that the note is flat or sharp, respectively. Tuners with a needle are often supplied with a backlight, so that the display can be read on a darkened stage.

For block LED or LCD tuners, markings on the readout drift left if the note is flat and right if the note is sharp from the desired pitch. If the input frequency is matched to the desired pitch frequency the LEDs are steady in the middle and an 'in tune' reading is given.

Some LCDs mimic needle tuners with a needle graphic that moves in the same way as a genuine needle tuner. Somewhat misleadingly, many LED displays have a 'strobe mode' that mimics strobe tuners by scrolling the flashing of the LEDs cyclically to simulate the display of a true strobe. However, these are all just display options. The way a regular tuner 'hears' and compares the input note to a desired pitch is exactly the same, with no change in accuracy.

The least expensive models only detect and display a small number of pitches, often those pitches that are required to tune a given instrument (e.g., E, A, D, G, B, E of standard guitar tuning). While this type of tuner is useful for bands that only use stringed instruments such as guitar and electric bass, it is not that useful for tuning brass or woodwind instruments. Tuners at the next price point offer chromatic tuning, the ability to detect and assess all the pitches in the chromatic scale (e.g., C, C♯, D, D♯, etc.). Chromatic tuners can be used for B♭ and E♭ brass instruments, such as saxophones and horns. Many models have circuitry that automatically detects which pitch is being played, and then compares it against the correct pitch. Less expensive models require the musician to specify the target pitch via a switch or slider. Most low- and mid-priced electronic tuners only allow tuning to an equal temperament scale.

Electric guitar and bass players who perform concerts may use electronic tuners built into an effects pedal, often called a stomp box. These tuners have a rugged metal or heavy-duty plastic housing and a foot-operated switch to toggle between the tuner and a bypass mode. Professional guitarists may use a more expensive version of the LED tuner mounted in a rack-mount case with a larger range of LEDs for more accurate pitch display. On many electronic tuners, the user can select a different note—useful for, for example, dropping a guitar's tuning to a lower pitch (e.g., Dropped tuning). Many models also let the user select reference pitches other than A440. This is useful to some Baroque musicians who play period instruments at lower reference pitches—such as A=435. Some higher-priced electronic tuners support tuning to a range of different temperaments—a feature useful to some guitarists and harpsichord players.

Some expensive tuners also include an on-board speaker that can sound notes, either to facilitate tuning by ear or to act as a pitch reference point for intonation practice. Some of these tuners also provide an adjustable read time that controls at what time interval the circuitry assesses pitch. The combination of all the above features makes some tuners preferable for tuning instruments in an orchestra. These are sometimes called "orchestral tuners".

=== Clip-on ===
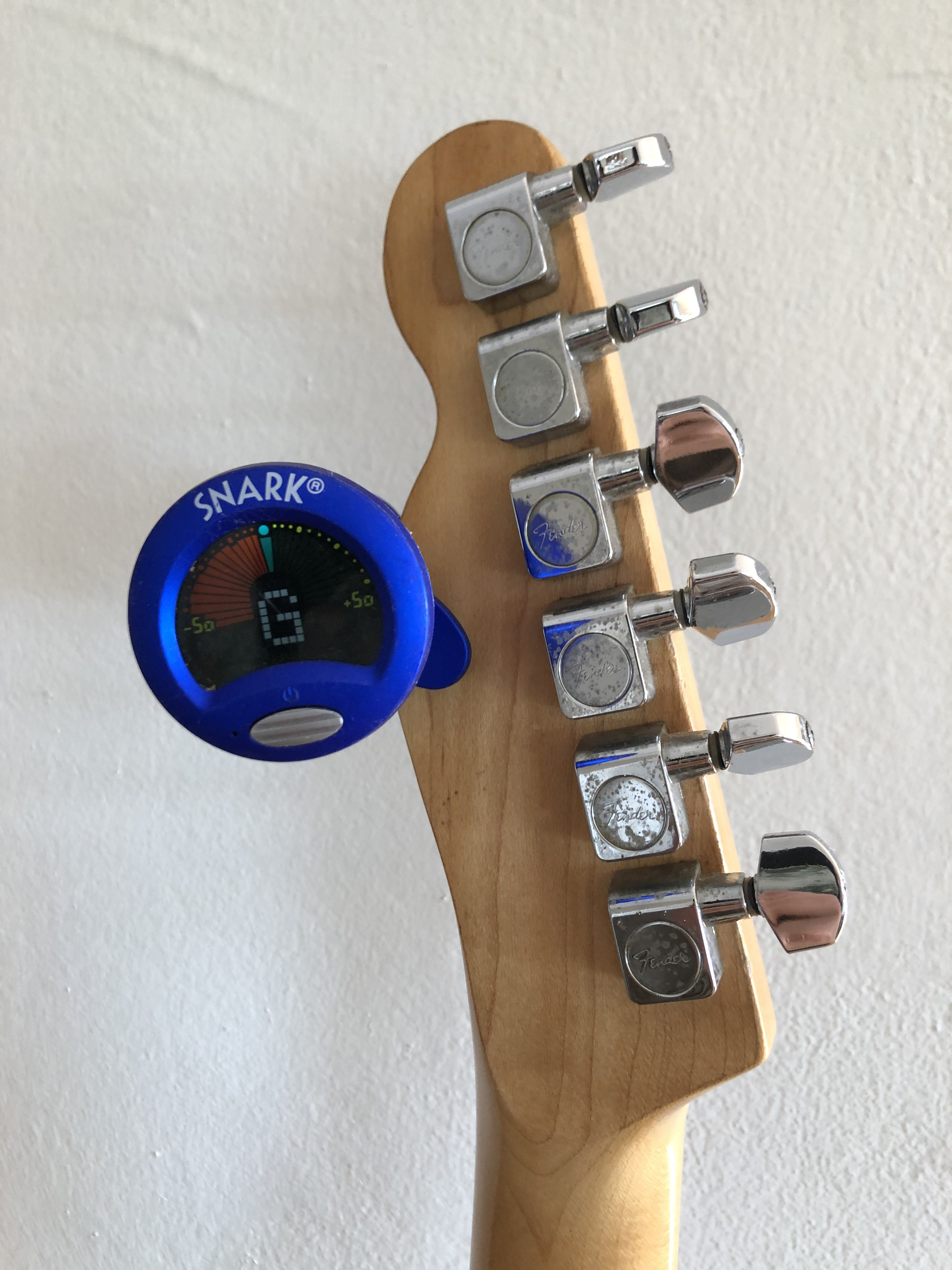
A common LCD clip-on guitar tuner, clipped onto the back of a Fender Telecaster headstock so that the guitarist can tune easily while wearing the guitar. A clip-on tuner attaches to the instrument and senses the vibrations from the instrument, even in a noisy environment.

A clip-on tuner clips onto an instrument—such as onto the headstock of a guitar or the bell of a trombone. A vibration sensor built into the clip transmits the instrument vibrations to the tuning circuitry. The absence of a microphone makes these tuners immune to background noise, so musicians can tune in noisy environments, including while other musicians are tuning. The first clip-on tuner was made by Mark Wilson from the OnBoard Research Corporation, and was marketed as Intellitouch PT1.

=== Apps ===
Since the early 2010s, many chromatic and guitar tuner apps are available for Android and iOS smartphones.

== Strobe tuners ==
Strobe tuners (the popular term for stroboscopic tuners) are the most accurate type of tuner. There are three types of strobe tuners: the mechanical rotating disk strobe tuner, an LED array strobe in place of the rotating disk, and "virtual strobe" tuners with LCDs or ones that work on personal computers. A strobe tuner shows the difference between a reference frequency and the musical note being played. Even the slightest difference between the two shows up as a rotating motion in the strobe display. The accuracy of the tuner is only limited by the internal frequency generator. The strobe tuner detects the pitch from either a TRS input jack or a built-in or external microphone connected to the tuner.

The first strobe tuner was produced in 1936 by Conn. It was at first sold as Conn's "Chromatic Stroboscope." then, beginning in the 1940s, as the Stroboconn. It was manufactured into the 1960s but is mainly a collector piece at present. The front panel had 12 strobe discs, driven by one motor. The gearing between discs was a very close approximation to the 12th root of two ratio. This tuner had an electrically driven temperature-compensated tuning fork. The electrical output of this fork was amplified to run the motor. The fork had sliding weights, an adjustment knob, and a dial to show the position of the weights. These weights permitted setting it to different reference frequencies (such as A_{4} = 435 Hz), although over a relatively narrow range, perhaps a whole tone. When set at A_{4} = 440 Hz the tuning fork produced a 55 Hz signal, which drove the four-pole 1650 RPM synchronous motor to which the A disc was mounted. (The other discs were all gear-driven off of this one.) Incoming audio was amplified to feed a long neon tube common to all 12 discs. Wind instrument players and repair people liked this tuner because it needed no adjustment to show different notes; though portable, its total weight was 68 pounds.

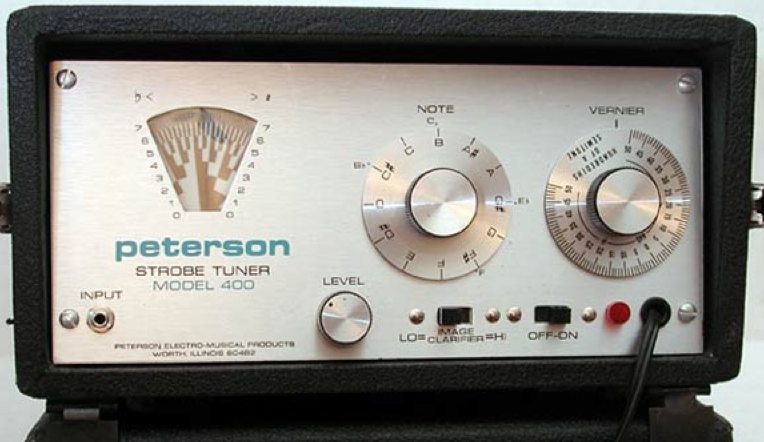
Peterson Tuners Model 400, 1967

The best-known brand in strobe tuner technology is Peterson Tuners who in 1967 marketed their first strobe tuner, the Model 400. Other companies, such as Sonic Research, TC Electronic, and Planet Waves, sell highly accurate LED-based true strobe tuners. Other LED tuners have a 'strobe mode' that emulates the appearance of a strobe. However, the accuracy of these tuners in strobe mode, while sufficient for most tuning, is no better than in any other mode, as they use the same technique as any basic tuner to measure frequency, only displaying it in a way that imitates a strobe tuner.

=== Operation ===
Mechanical strobe tuners have a series of lamps or LEDs powered by amplified audio from the instrument; they flash (or strobe) at the same frequency as the input signal. For instance, an 'A' played on a guitar's 6th string at the 5th fret has the frequency of 110 Hz when in tune. An 'A' played on the 1st string at the 5th fret vibrates at 440 Hz. As such, the lamps would flash either 110 or 440 times per second in the above examples. In front of these flashing lights is a motor-driven, translucent printed disc with rings of alternating transparent and opaque sectors.

This disc rotates at a fixed specific speed, set by the user. Each disc rotation speed is set to a particular frequency of the desired note. If the note being played (and making the lamps behind the disc flash) is at exactly the same frequency as the spinning of the disc, then the disc appears to be static from the strobing effect. If the note is out of tune then the pattern appears to be moving as the light flashing and the disc rotation are out of sync from each other. The more out of tune the played note is, the faster the pattern seems to be moving, although in reality it always spins at the same speed for a given note. Many good turntables for vinyl disc records have stroboscopic patterns lit by the incoming AC power (mains). The power frequency, either 50 or 60 Hz, serves as the reference, although commercial power frequency sometimes changes slightly (a few tenths of a percent) with varying load. Unless reference and measured quantity are interchanged, the operating principle is the same; the turntable speed is adjusted to stop drifting of the pattern.

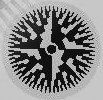
Pattern of a mechanical strobe tuner disc

As the disc has multiple bands, each with different spacings, each band can be read for different partials within one note. As such, extremely fine tuning can be obtained, because the user can tune to a particular partial within a given note. This is impossible on regular needle, LCD or LED tuners. The strobe system is about 30 times more accurate than a quality electronic tuner, being accurate to 1/10 of a cent. Advertisements for the Sonic Research LED strobe claim that it is calibrated to ± 0.0017 cents and guaranteed to maintain an accuracy of ± 0.02 cents or 1/50 of a cent.

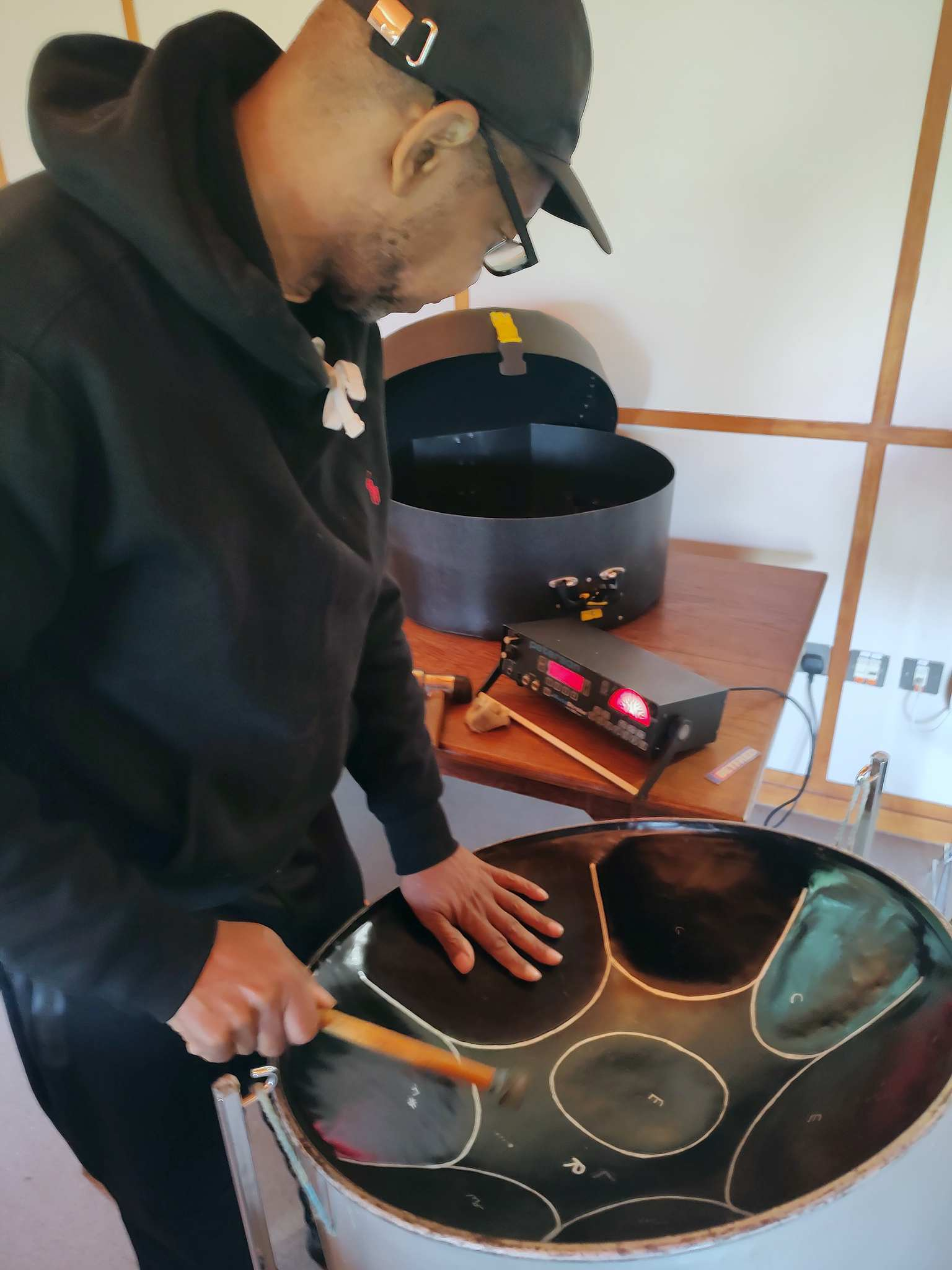
Tuning a steelpan with a Peterson 590 AutoStrobe disc strobe tuner

Strobe units can often be calibrated for many tunings and preset temperaments and allow for custom temperament programming, stretched tuning, "sweetened" temperament tunings and Buzz Feiten tuning modifications. Due to their accuracy and ability to display partials even on instruments with a very short "voice" (e.g., notes of short duration), strobe tuners can perform tuning tasks that would be very difficult, if not impossible, for needle-type tuners. For instance, needle/LED display type tuners cannot track the signal to identify a tone of the Caribbean steelpan (often nicknamed the "steeldrum") due to its very short "voice". A tuner needs to be able to detect the first few partials for tuning such an instrument, which means that only a strobe tuner can be used for steelpan tuning. This is also true of the comb teeth used in mechanical musical instruments like Music Boxes and the like. In such cases, a technician has to physically remove metal from the tooth to reach the desired note. The metal teeth only resonate briefly when plucked. Great accuracy is required as once the metal is cut or filed away, the lost material cannot be replaced. As such, the strobe-type tuners are the unit of choice for such tasks. Tuners with an accuracy of better than 0.2 cent are required for guitar intonation tuning.

One of the most expensive strobe tuners is the Peterson Strobe Center, which has twelve separate mechanical strobe displays; one for each pitch of the equally tempered octave. This unit (about US$3,500) can tune multiple notes of a sound or chord, displaying each note's overtone sub-structure simultaneously. This gives an overall picture of tuning within a sound, note or chord that is not possible with most other tuning devices. (The TC Electronic Polytune can display the pitch accuracy of up to six pre-selected notes.) It is often used for tuning complex instruments and sound sources, or difficult-to-tune instruments where the technician requires a very accurate and complete aural picture of an instrument's output. For instance, when tuning musical bells, this model displays several of the bell's partials (hum, second partial, tierce, quint and nominal/naming note) as well as the prime, and each of their partials, on separate displays. The unit is heavy and fragile, and requires a regular maintenance schedule. Each of the twelve displays requires periodic re-calibration. It can be used to teach students about note substructures, which show on the separate strobing displays.

==== Strobe developments ====
Mechanical Disc strobe tuners work by spinning a printed disc under a flashing light source;
as the disc rotates, an in-tune note makes the visual pattern appear to stand still.

While highly precise, these units are costly, bulky, and mechanically delicate — the motor that spins the disc and the strobing light source both need periodic upkeep. For many musicians and technicians, the combination of expense and maintenance makes a mechanical strobe impractical.

In response, manufacturers began producing electronic "virtual" strobe tuners in the early 2000s.
These replace the spinning disc with a digital display visualization — typically an LCD dot-matrix screen — that recreates the same stroboscopic effect without moving parts. Rugged, floor-mounted "stomp box" versions built for live performance followed a few years later.

Virtual strobe tuners can match the pitch accuracy of mechanical ones, but the display works differently.
A mechanical disc shows one band per specific frequency, including harmonic partials, giving a detailed view of a note's overtone structure. Virtual displays instead consolidate nearby frequencies into a smaller number of bands, each roughly representing octaves of the fundamental. This is simpler to read and still very accurate for everyday tuning and intonation work, but it doesn't resolve individual partials the way a disc strobe can.

A related design uses a ring of LEDs that flash in a strobing pattern keyed to the input frequency.
Like LCD-based virtual strobes, these "true strobe" LED tuners need no mechanical servicing and cost much less than disc-based units, making strobe-level accuracy accessible to a wider range of musicians.
LED versions generally show only pitch, with no harmonic detail, while LCD virtual strobes can display a handful of consolidated bands of additional information.

By the late 2000s strobe tuning had also moved into software — PC applications and, soon after, smartphone apps that reproduce the virtual strobe display and typically add features like user-programmable temperaments and alternate tuning systems. These require only a computer or mobile device placed near the instrument, rather than dedicated hardware.

Strobe App (Concept)

Strobe tuners, both mechanical and electronic, are used by professional luthiers who are restorers of early instruments such as harpsichords, and other specialists who need very precise pitch control. Piano and harp technicians also use Strobe tuners.

== Uses ==
=== Classical music ===
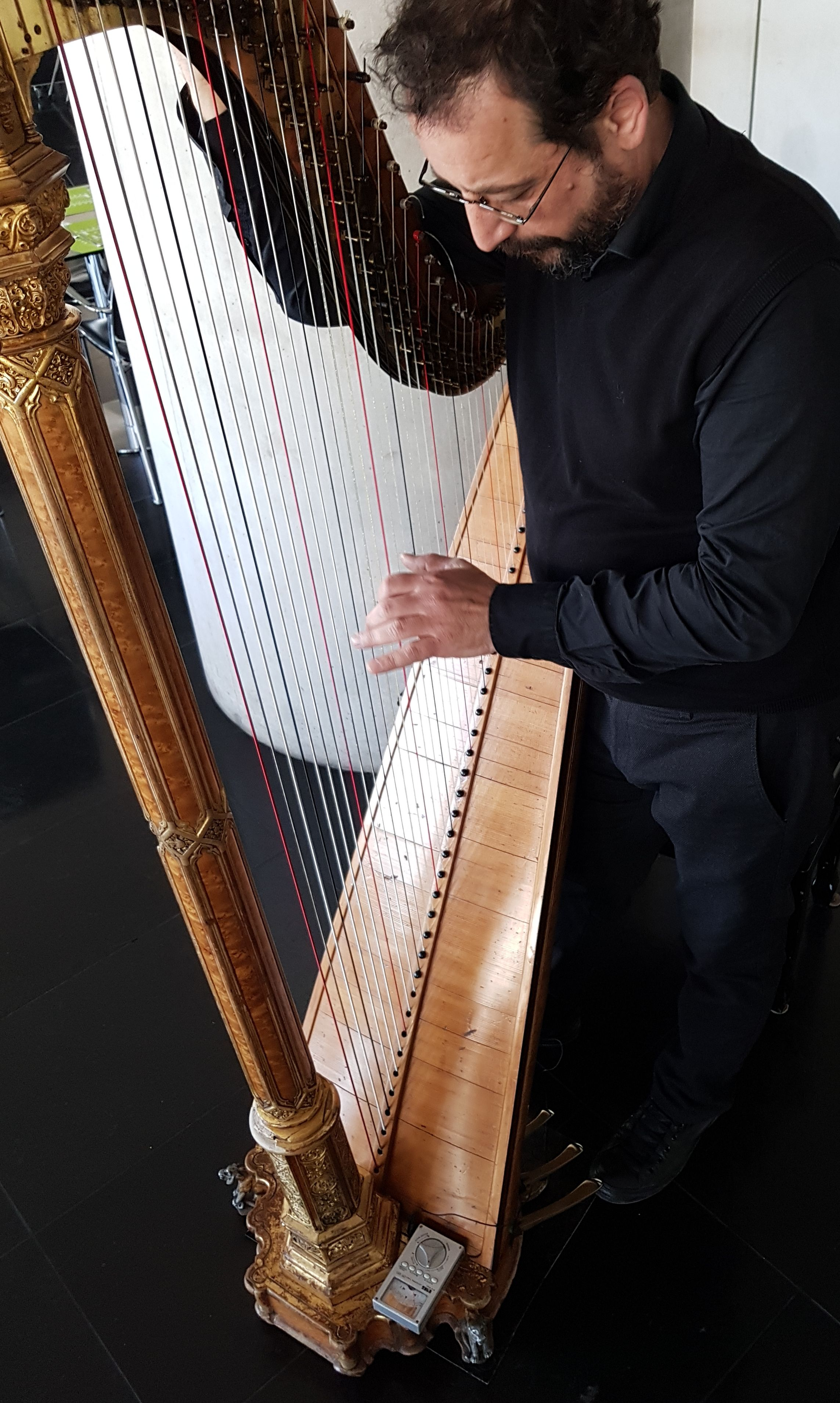
Tuning of Sébastien Érard harp using Korg OT-120 Wide 8 Octave Orchestral Digital Tuner

In classical music, there is a longstanding tradition to tune "by ear", by adjusting the pitch of instruments to a reference pitch. In an orchestra, the oboe player gives an "A4", and the different instrument sections tune to this note. In chamber music, either one of the woodwind players gives an "A", or if none is present, one of the string players, usually the first violinist, bows their open "A" string. If an orchestra is accompanying a piano concerto, the first oboist takes the "A" from the piano and then plays this pitch for the rest of the orchestra.

Despite this tradition of tuning by ear, electronic tuners are still widely used in classical music. In orchestras the oboist often uses a high-end electronic tuner to ensure that their "A" is correct. As well, other brass or woodwind players may use electronic tuners to ensure that their instruments are correctly tuned. Classical performers also use tuners off-stage for practice purposes or to check their tuning (or, with the further aid of a speaker, to practice ear training). Electronic tuners are also used in opera orchestras for offstage trumpet effects. In offstage trumpet effects, trumpet players performs a melody from the backstage or from a hallway behind the stage, creating a haunting, muted effect. Since trumpet players cannot hear the orchestra, they cannot know whether or not their notes are in tune with the rest of the ensemble; to resolve this problem, some trumpet players use a high-end, sensitive tuner so that they can monitor the pitch of their notes.

Piano tuners, harp makers and the builders and restorers of early instruments, e.g. harpsichords, use high-end tuners to assist with their tuning and instrument building. Even piano tuners who work mostly "by ear" may use an electronic tuner to tune just a first key on the piano, e. g. the a' to 440 Hz, after which they proceed by means of octaves, approximate fifths and approximate fourths to tune the others. (In the twelve-tone equal temperament system dominant in classical and Western music, all intervals except the octave are slightly "mistuned" or compromised compared to more consonant just intervals.) They may also use electronic tuners to get a very out-of-tune piano roughly in pitch, after which point they tune by ear. Electronic tuning devices for keyboard instruments are for various reasons generally much more complex and therefore expensive than in the case of other widely used instruments.

=== Popular and folk music ===
In popular music, amateur and professional bands from styles as varied as country and heavy metal use electronic tuners to ensure that the guitars and electric bass are correctly tuned. In popular music genres such as rock music, there is a great deal of stage volume due to the use of drums and guitar amplifiers, so it can be difficult to tune "by ear". Electronic tuners are helpful aids at jam sessions where a number of players are sharing the stage, because it helps all of the players to have their instruments tuned to the same pitch, even if they have come to the session halfway through. Tuners are helpful with acoustic instruments, because they are more affected by temperature and humidity changes. An acoustic guitar or upright bass that is perfectly in tune backstage can change in pitch under the heat of the stage lights and from the humidity from thousands of audience members.

Tuners are used by guitar technicians who are hired by rock and pop bands to ensure that all of the band's instruments are ready to play at all times. Guitar technicians (often called guitar techs) tune all of the instruments (electric guitars, electric basses, acoustic guitars, mandolins, etc.) before the show, after they are played, and before they are used onstage. Guitar techs also retune instruments throughout the show. Whereas amateur musicians typically use a relatively inexpensive quartz tuner, guitar technicians typically use expensive, high-end tuners such as strobe tuners. Most strobe tuners, counter-intuitively, also use quartz crystal oscillators as time references, although the responses are processed differently by the different units.

=== Bell tuning ===
Strobe tuners are used in the tuning of bells, which require accurate tuning of many partials. The removal of metal from various parts of the bell shape is by a tuning lathe, and once too much metal has been removed it cannot be reversed. Hence accurate approach to the desired tuning partial is essential to prevent overshoot.

== See also ==
- Microtuner – Device to test musical instrument tuning
- Synchronization – Coordination of events to operate a system in unison
- Tuning fork – Device that generates sounds of constant pitch when struck
- Autotune – Audio processor that alters pitch
