= A440 (pitch standard) =

Pitch standard

A440 (also known as Stuttgart pitch) is the musical pitch corresponding to an audio frequency of 440 Hz, which serves as a tuning standard for the musical note of A above middle C, or A_{4} in scientific pitch notation. It is standardized by the International Organization for Standardization as ISO 16. Other frequencies have been, and sometimes still are, used to tune to this note, but A440 is the reference frequency for calibrating acoustic equipment and tuning musical instruments.

== History and use ==
Johann Heinrich Scheibler recommended A440 as a standard in 1834 after inventing the "tonometer" to measure pitch, and it was approved by the Society of German Natural Scientists and Physicians at a meeting in Stuttgart the same year. During the same era, in the 1860s, the French established a standard of 435 Hz, which was adopted by many countries and organizations. The Austrian government's 1885 recommendation was also for a standard of 435 Hz.

The American music industry reached an informal standard of 440 Hz in 1926, and some began using it in instrument manufacturing. In 1936, the American Standards Association recommended that the A above middle C be tuned to 440 Hz.

In 1937 Sir James Swinburne, an electrical engineer and avid amateur musician, delivered a lecture to the Royal Musical Association on "The Ideal Scale," discussing the possibility of tuning a scale to pure ratios and adjusting these ratios to maintain consonance across different keys. The following year, Swinburne represented the Musical Association at a preliminary conference to determine the British stance on concert pitch. British piano tuners had adopted A439 as the standard in 1899, but Swinburne pointed out that 439 was a prime number, whereas 440 could be more easily factored and electronically synthesized. In May 1939, delegates from France, Germany, The Netherlands, Italy, and England convened at Broadcasting House in London, the headquarters of the BBC, to address the issue of concert pitch. Representatives from Switzerland and the United States participated via mail. The other European delegates concurred with Swinburne's position and agreed to a standard of A440.

This standard was taken up by the International Organization for Standardization in 1955 as Recommendation R 16, before being formalised in 1975 as ISO 16.

The A440 standard is not universally adhered to. Early-music ensembles continue to use older, lower pitch levels. Leonard Bernstein often tuned the New York Philharmonic to A442, leading to complaints from the piano tuners' union, although he claimed both the New York and Boston orchestras had used this higher pitch for years.

== Modern practices ==
An 88-key piano, with the octaves numbered and middle C (cyan) and A_{4} (yellow) highlighted

A440 is widely used as concert pitch in the United Kingdom and the United States. In continental Europe the frequency of A_{4} commonly varies between 440 Hz and 444 Hz. In the period instrument movement, a consensus has arisen around a modern 'baroque pitch' of 415 Hz (with 440 Hz corresponding to A♯) corresponding to Kammerton, another 'baroque' pitch known as Chorton pitch for some organs (in particular, some German church music, e.g. the pre-Leipzig period cantatas of Bach) at 466 Hz (with 440 Hz corresponding to A♭), and a 'classical pitch' at 427–430 Hz.

A440
5 seconds of a pure tone at 440 Hz

A440 is often used as a tuning reference in just intonation regardless of the fundamental note or key.

The US time and frequency station WWV broadcasts a 440 Hz signal at two minutes past every hour, with WWVH broadcasting the same tone at the first minute past every hour. This was added in 1936 to aid orchestras in tuning their instruments.

== See also ==
- History of pitch standards in Western music
- Electronic tuner

Preceded by ISO 15	List of ISO standards ISO 16	Succeeded by ISO 17
