= Acoustic =

Acoustic may refer to:

- Acoustics, a branch of physics focusing on the study of sound

== Music ==
=== Albums ===
- Acoustic (Above & Beyond album), 2014
- Acoustic (Deine Lakaien album), 2007
- Acoustic (Eva Cassidy album), 2017
- Acoustic (Everything but the Girl album), 1992
- Acoustic (John Lennon album), 2004
- Acoustic (Love Amongst Ruin album), 2011
- Acoustic (Nitty Gritty Dirt Band album), 1994
- Acoustic (Nouvelle Vague album), 2009
- Acoustic (Simple Minds album), 2016
- The Acoustic by Ektomorf, 2012
- Acoustic by Oumou Sangaré, 2020
- Acoustic Volume 2 by Joey Cape and Tony Sly, 2012

=== EPs and singles ===
- Acoustic (Bayside EP), 2006
- Acoustic (Britt Nicole EP), 2010
- Acoustic (Coldplay EP), 2000
- Acoustic (Lights EP), 2010
- Acoustic (Second Coming EP), an acoustic version of 13, 2003
- Acoustic, by Brandi Carlile, 2004
- Acoustic, by Gabrielle Aplin, 2010
- Acoustic, by Press to Meco, 2019
- "Acoustic" (single), "Follow You Home" and "Refugees", by Embrace, 2014

=== Companies ===
- Acoustic (magazine)
- Acoustic Guitar (magazine)
- Acoustic Disc, a record label owned by David Grisman
- Acoustic Control Corporation, produced amplifiers

=== Other music ===
- Acoustic guitar, as opposed to electric guitar
- Acoustic bass guitar, as opposed to electric bass guitar
- Acoustic music, music that solely or primarily uses non-electrical instruments
- Acoustic recording, a pre-microphone method of recording
- Architectural acoustics, a branch of building design which aims for ideal sound projection
- Musical acoustics, the branch of acoustics that studies the physics of music
- Piano acoustics, the physical properties of the piano that affect its sound

== Technology ==
- Acoustic cryptanalysis, in cryptography, a side channel attack which exploits sounds
- Acoustic fingerprint, a condensed digital summary, a fingerprint generated from an audio signal
- Acoustic location, a pre-radar and pre-sonar method of detecting hostile vehicles and vessels
- Acoustic metamaterials, engineered materials with atypical properties
- Acoustic signature, sound emitters, such as those of ships and submarines
- Acoustic thermometry, observation of ocean climate using long-range instruments
- Acoustic torpedo, a torpedo that aims itself

== Other uses ==
- Acoustic (film), a 2010 South Korean omnibus film
- External acoustic meatus, another name for the ear canal

== See also ==
- Acoustica (disambiguation)
- Acoustics (disambiguation)
- Acoustic EP (disambiguation), various albums
- Acoustic Sessions (disambiguation)
