= Piano acoustics =

Set of physical properties of the piano that affect its sound

Piano acoustics is the set of physical properties of the piano that affect its sound. It is an area of study within musical acoustics.

== String length, mass and tension ==
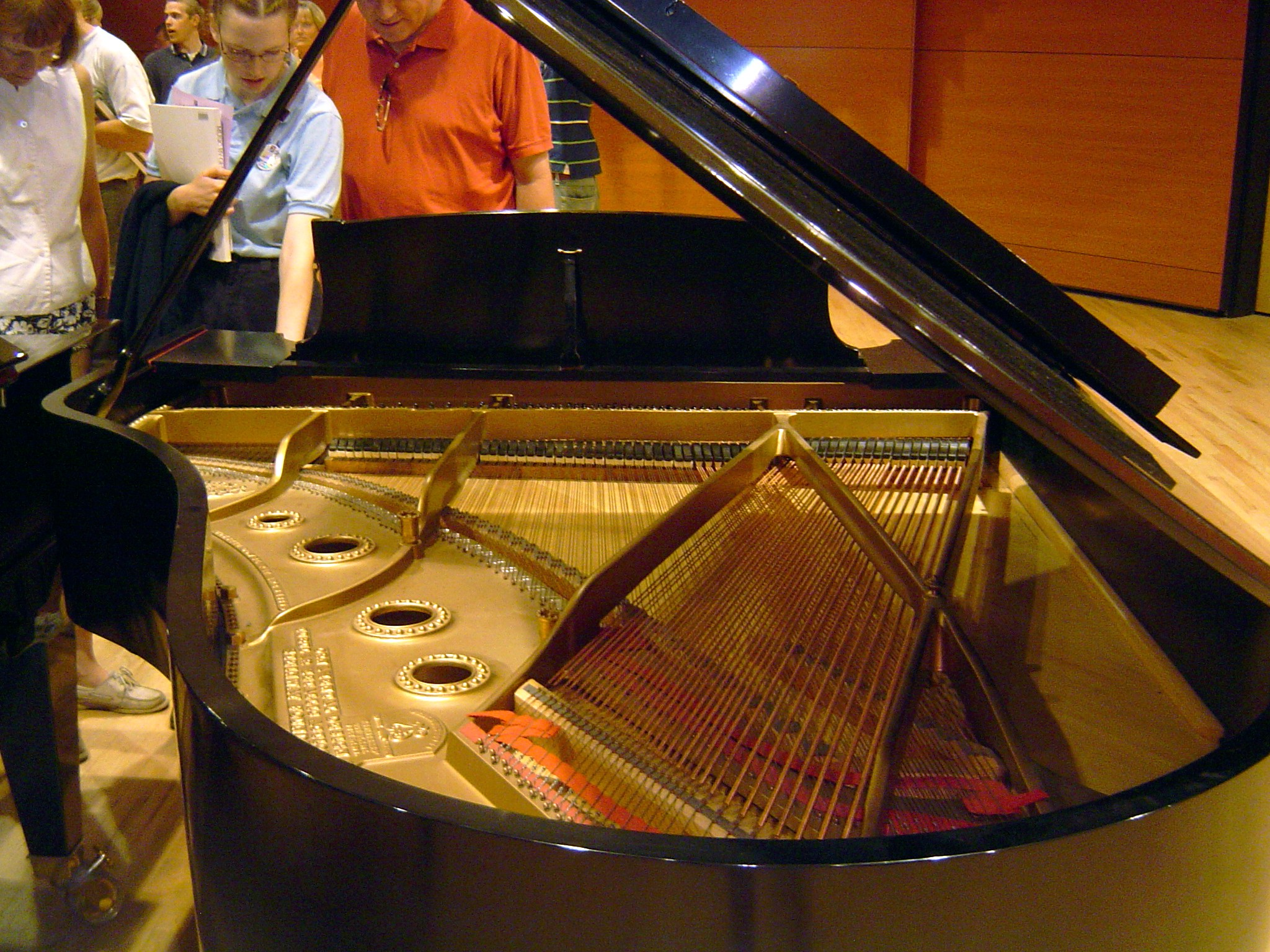
Strings incrementally vary in length and diameter, with the longest and largest in the bass, and the shortest and smallest in the treble.

The strings of a piano vary in diameter, and therefore in mass per length, with lower strings thicker than upper. A typical range is from .240 inches (6.1 mm) for the lowest bass strings to .031 inches (0.79 mm), string size 13, for the highest treble strings. These differences in string thickness follow from well-understood acoustic properties of strings.

Given two strings, equally taut and heavy, one twice as long as the other, the longer will vibrate with a pitch one octave lower than the shorter. However, if one were to use this principle to design a piano, i.e. if one began with the highest notes and then doubled the length of the strings again and again for each lower octave, it would be impossible to fit the bass strings onto a frame of any reasonable size. Furthermore, when strings vibrate, the width of the vibrations is related to the string length; in such a hypothetical ultra-long piano, the lowest strings would strike one another when played. Instead, piano makers take advantage of the fact that a heavy string vibrates more slowly than a light string of identical length and tension; thus, the bass strings on the piano are shorter than the "double with each octave" rule would predict, and are much thicker than the others.

The other factor that affects pitch, other than length, density and mass, is tension. Individual string tension in a concert grand piano may average 200 pounds-force (890 N), and have a cumulative tension exceeding 20 tonnes-force (200 kN).

== Inharmonicity and piano size ==
Any vibrating thing produces vibrations at a number of frequencies above the fundamental pitch. These are called overtones. When the overtones are integer multiples (e.g., 2×, 3×, 4×, ... ) of the fundamental frequency (called harmonics), then— neglecting damping— the oscillation is periodic, i.e. it vibrates exactly the same way over and over. Many enjoy the sound of periodic oscillations; for this reason, many musical instruments, including pianos, are designed to produce nearly periodic oscillations, that is, to have overtones as close as possible to the harmonics of the fundamental tone.

In an ideal vibrating string, when the wavelength of a wave on a stretched string is much greater than the thickness of the string (the theoretical ideal being a string of zero thickness and zero resistance to bending), the wave velocity on the string is constant and the overtones are at the harmonics. That is why so many instruments are constructed of skinny strings or thin columns of air.

However, for high overtones with short wavelengths that approach the diameter of the string, the string behaves more like a thick metal bar: its mechanical resistance to bending becomes an additional force to the tension, which 'raises the pitch' of the overtones. Only when the bending force is much smaller than the tension of the string, are its wave-speed (and the overtones pitched as harmonics) unchanged. The frequency-raised overtones (above the harmonics), called 'partials', can produce an unpleasant effect called inharmonicity. Basic strategies to reduce inharmonicity include decreasing the thickness of the string or increasing its length, choosing a flexible material with a low bending force, and increasing the tension force so that it stays much bigger than the bending force.

Winding a string allows an effective decrease in the thickness of the string. In a wound string, only the inner core resists bending while the windings function only to increase the linear density of the string. The thickness of the inner core is limited by its strength and by its tension; stronger materials allow for thinner cores at higher tensions, reducing inharmonicity. Hence, piano designers choose high-quality steel for their strings, as its strength and durability help them minimize string diameters.

If string diameter, tension, mass, uniformity, and length compromises were the only factors—all pianos could be small, spinet-sized instruments. Piano builders, however, have found that longer strings increase instrument power, harmonicity, and reverberation, and help produce a properly tempered tuning scale.

With longer strings, larger pianos achieve the longer wavelengths and tonal characteristics desired. Piano designers strive to fit the longest strings possible within the case; moreover, all else being equal, the sensible piano buyer tries to obtain the largest instrument compatible with budget and space.

Inharmonicity increases continuously as notes get further from the middle of the piano, and is one of the practical limits on the total range of the instrument. The lowest strings, which are necessarily the longest, are most limited by the size of the piano. The designer of a short piano is forced to use thick strings to increase mass density and is thus driven into accepting greater inharmonicity.

The highest strings must be under the greatest tension, yet must also be thin enough to allow for a low mass density. The limited strength of steel (i.e. a too-thin string will break under the tension) forces the piano designer to use very short and slightly thicker strings, whose short wavelengths thus generate inharmonicity.

The natural inharmonicity of a piano is used by the tuner to make slight adjustments in the tuning of a piano. The tuner stretches the notes, slightly sharpening the high notes and flatting the low notes to make overtones of lower notes have the same frequency as the fundamentals of higher notes.

See also Piano wire, piano tuning, psychoacoustics.

== The Railsback curve ==
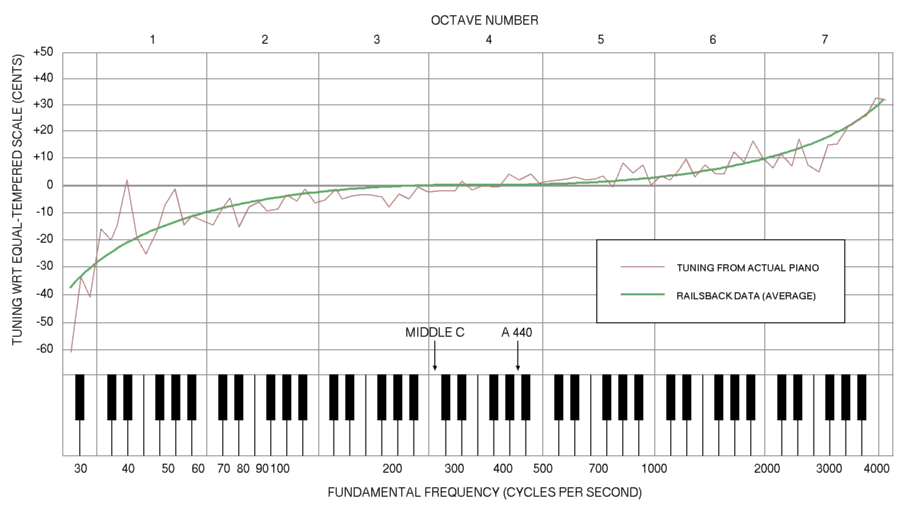
The Railsback curve shows how a piano tuned to compensate for inharmonicity deviates from theoretically correct equal-tempered tuning.

The Railsback curve, first measured in the 1930s by O.L. Railsback, a US college physics teacher, expresses the difference between inharmonicity-aware stretched piano tuning, and theoretically correct equal-tempered tuning in which the frequencies of successive notes are related by a constant ratio, equal to the twelfth root of two. For any given note on the piano, the deviation between the actual pitch of that note and its theoretical equal-tempered pitch is given in cents (hundredths of a semitone). The curve is derived empirically from actual pianos tuned to be pleasing to the ear, not from an exact mathematical equation.

As the Railsback curve shows, octaves are normally stretched on a well-tuned piano. That is, the high notes are tuned higher, and the low notes tuned lower, than they are in a mathematically idealized equal-tempered scale. Railsback discovered that pianos were typically tuned in this manner not because of a lack of precision, but because of inharmonicity in the strings. For a string vibrating like an ideal harmonic oscillator, the overtone series of a single played note includes many additional, higher frequencies, each of which is an integer multiple of the fundamental frequency. But in fact, inharmonicity caused by piano strings being slightly inflexible makes the overtones actually produced successively higher than they would be if the string were perfectly harmonic.

=== Shape of the curve ===
Inharmonicity in a string is caused primarily by stiffness. That stiffness is the result of piano wire's inherent hardness and ductility, together with string tension, thickness, and length. When tuners adjust the tension of the wire during tuning, they establish pitches relative to notes that have already been tuned. Those previously tuned notes have overtones that are sharpened by inharmonicity, which causes the newly established pitch to conform to the sharpened overtone. As the tuning progresses up and down the scale, the inharmonicity, hence the stretch, accumulates.

It is a common misconception that the Railsback curve demonstrates that the middle of the piano is less inharmonic than the upper and lower regions. It only appears that way because piano tuning normally starts in the middle. "Stretch" is a comparative term: it is by definition impossible to stretch the tuning of the note that is tuned first, regardless of which note has been chosen as the starting point.

Further, it is often construed that the upper notes of the piano are especially inharmonic, because they appear to be stretched dramatically. In fact, the stretch applied to them is a reflection of the inharmonicity of strings in the middle of the piano. The inharmonicity of the upper notes has no bearing on tuning, because their upper partials are beyond the range of human hearing.

As expected, the graph of the actual tuning is not a smooth curve, but a jagged line with peaks and troughs. This might be the result of imprecise tuning, inexact measurement, or the piano's innate variability in string scaling. It has also been suggested that such irregularities arise from the way human tuners balance competing harmonic relationships, as reproduced by Monte Carlo tuning methods that minimize spectral entropy and produce small local pitch variations similar to those observed in real tuning.

== Multiple strings ==
All but the lowest notes of a piano have multiple strings tuned to the same frequency. The notes with two strings are called bichords, and those with three strings are called trichords. These allow the piano to have a loud attack with a fast decay but a long sustain in the attack–decay–sustain–release (ADSR) system.

The trichords create a coupled oscillator with three normal modes (with two polarizations each). Since the strings are only weakly coupled, the normal modes have imperceptibly different frequencies. But they transfer their vibrational energy to the sounding board at significantly different rates.

The normal mode in which the three strings oscillate together is most efficient at transferring energy since all three strings pull in the same direction at the same time. It sounds loud, but decays quickly. This normal mode is responsible for the loud, rapidly-fading "attack" part of the note.

In the other two normal modes, strings do not all pull together, e.g., one pulls up while the other two pull down. There is a slow transfer of energy to the sounding board, generating a soft but near-constant sustain.

== See also ==
- Electronic tuner
- Inharmonicity
