= Gerhard Steinke =

German sound engineer (1927–2025)

- Born: 12 August 1927; Germany
- Died: 26 May 2025 (aged 97)
- Occupation: Audio engineer
- Years active: 1947–1990s

Gerhard Steinke (12 August 1927 – 26 May 2025) was a German audio engineer.

== Background ==
Steinke studied acoustics in Dresden and began his career at Radio Dresden in 1947. In 1953, he joined the Radio and Television Research Centre (Rundfunk- und Fernsehtechnisches Zentralamt) in Berlin, where he established a laboratory focused on acoustical boundary problems in broadcasting. In 1956, he set up the first subjective listening test group to assess sound recordings and impairments in broadcasting. His findings were incorporated into international standards—including from the International Radio and Television Organisation (OIRT), the International Telecommunication Union and the European Broadcasting Union—on listening tests and testing rooms.

Steinke lectured on sound technology and electronic music at Berlin's University of Music for 27 years. For his work on audio standards, he received the OIRT's Honorary Golden Medal and the Acoustical Society of Hungary's Von Békésy Medal. He is also a life fellow in the Audio Engineering Society (AES) and a recipient of its Gold Medal Award.

Steinke died on 26 May 2025, at the age of 97.

== Career ==
Steinke began his career in 1947 as a sound engineer for Mitteldeutscher Rundfunk's Radio Dresden, where he worked on recorded productions with the Staatskapelle Dresden and Dresden Philharmonic orchestras. From 1949–53, he studied electroacoustics at the Technical University of Dresden. He then got a job at Deutsche Post's Radio and Television Research Centre, Berlin-Adlershof, beginning as a research and development engineer for magnetic recording.

From 1956–70, he led a laboratory on acoustico-musical boundary problems in broadcasting and established an experimental electronic music studio. In 1962, the studio developed a new subharmonic synthesizer, the "Subharchord", which was used in radio, film, and television and was exported to broadcasting organizations in Czechoslovakia and Norway.

Also beginning in 1956, his acoustic laboratory studied the subjective evaluation of audio transmission quality, reproduction, and listening conditions. Steinke worked closely with sound engineers, sound designers (Tonmeisters), and production artists at the Funkhaus Berlin Nalepastrasse, focusing on experimental recordings and the acoustical properties of rooms. In 1960, he became the head of a telecommunications and broadcasting group, where he was responsible for the introduction of stereophonic broadcasting in East Germany in 1963.

Starting in 1971, he directed research and development of sound and video systems technology at the Radio and Television Research Centre. He helped develop the delta stereophony system—the first true directional and distance sound reinforcement system for large halls and television productions—as well as a home processor for multichannel audio. Today, the sound reinforcement system is used both in Germany and abroad. Multichannel stereo ambiophonics (the first four-channel system) and automatic sound studio technical equipment were also developed under his leadership.

In 1987, Steinke was sent to India for several months as an expert consultant to radio stations in New Delhi, Srinagar, Calcutta, and Bombay. There, he produced proposals and recommendations for the transition from analog to digital broadcasting.

In 1990, he moved to Deutsche Telekom. He set up its research and development department for new sound transmission systems, and led the department until his retirement in 1992. After retiring, he continued to work as a senior audio consultant for various institutions, and to write and lecture on surround sound and electronic sound art.

== Professional societies and affiliations ==
Steinke was active in international standardization bodies from 1955–92. He served for more than 12 years as the president of Study Group 2 (Sound Technology/Recording) in the OIRT, and held the chairmanship of the Working Party 10-C (Audio/Digital) of the CCIR/ITU-R for more than 18 years, focusing particularly on multichannel techniques and quality evaluation.

He worked with the Verband Deutscher Tonmeister (VDT) from 1954 on, and with the international Audio Engineering Society (AES) from 1963 on. He was awarded the AES Fellowship in 1986 and elected European vice president of AES from 1991–93. In that role, he oversaw the creation of new AES sections in Eastern Europe. At VDT, he co-founded the Surround Sound Forum, where he was responsible for the standardization and improvement of reproduction and recording technology.

At the University of Music in Berlin, he taught from 1956–83 in the fields of sound studio technology (tonstudiotechnik) and electronic music and sound art production (elektronische klangerzeugung).

Over the course of his career, Steinke published more than 450 papers, books, and lectures. A collection of his papers can be found in his 2012 book Mit den Ohren sehen – mit den Augen hören ("Seeing with the ears – listening with the eyes".

== Honors ==
Steinke received the OIRT's Honorary Medal in 1984 for his international work on standardization, and the Acoustical Society of Hungary's Von Békésy Medal in 1992 for his work in acoustics.

In May 2007, the Audio Engineering Society awarded him the highest award, the AES Gold Medal "for outstanding contributions to audio engineering, sustained over 60 years in the areas of radio and television broadcasting, studio acoustics, sound reinforcement, multichannel sound and international standardization of audio".

For his decades of work with the VDT and the Surround Sound Forum, he was honored in 2007 at the VDT's International Symposium in Ludwigsburg.
