= Negative harmony =

Concept in music theory

In music theory, negative harmony is a concept that every musical note, or more precisely, every interval — and therefore every chord, has a corresponding “negative” counterpart produced by reflecting the pitch across a harmonic axis between the tonic root and its dominant. The idea stems from the theory of polarity of Ernst Levy (1895–1981), presented in his book A Theory of Harmony. The term "negative harmony" was later developed and coined by American saxophonist Steve Coleman and gained broader attention in the early 21st century through the influence of English musician Jacob Collier.

== Function ==
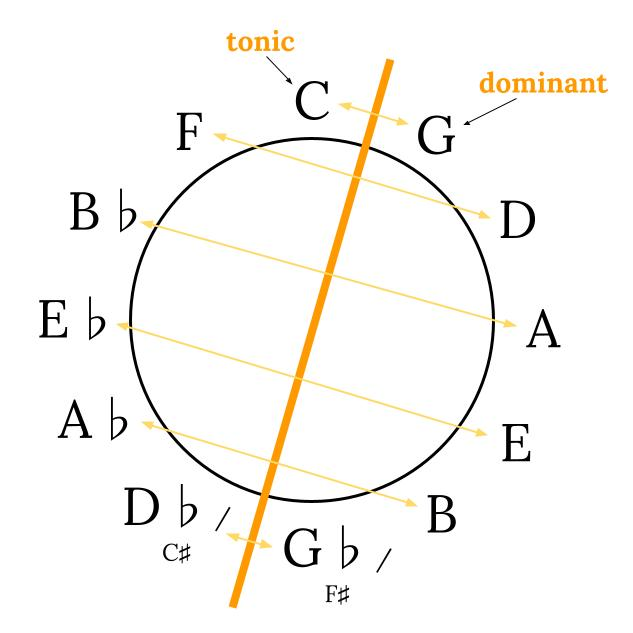
Circle of fifths with the negative harmony axis

Within a given key, each pitch can be mapped to its negative counterpart by flipping it across an axis that cuts down the circle of fifths between the tonic and dominant pitches (i.e. C and G, respectively, in the key of C). This procedure can be used as a compositional technique to create "negative" versions of melodic lines or chords. Under this transformation, major chords become minor chords and vice versa, and ascending gestures become descending gestures, and vice versa. The negative counterpart preserves the same functional pull toward the tonic as the original material, while providing an alternative sonority that can expand a composer's expressive palette.

While negative harmony may resemble melodic inversion, it differs in two key aspects. First, negative harmony involves a strict reflection of every pitch across the defined axis, whereas diatonic inversion may adjust or reinterpret certain pitches to remain within the scale. Second, the “negative” form is transposed by a fifth relative to the original, rather than remaining within the same key area.

== Origin ==
=== Explaining the minor triad ===
In the broader historical effort to explain the natural origins of the minor triad, given that the major triad can be derived directly from the harmonic series, Italian music theorist Gioseffo Zarlino (1517–1590) noticed that the process of building a major triad (stacking a major third and a perfect fifth above a note, i.e. C-E-G) can be inverted to construct a minor triad (descending from the same note a major third and a perfect fifth, i.e. C-Ab-F, read downward). Therefore, Zarlino concluded that the major triad is the polar opposite of the minor chord. However, this polarity theory remained unnoticed for two centuries, until it was cited by violinist Giuseppe Tartini (1692–1770), who sought to explain the minor triad in terms of string length division.

=== Riemannian Theory ===
German musicologist Hugo Riemann (1849–1919) considered Zarlino to be the pioneer of modern harmonic discourse and expanded upon the ideas of Zarlino, Tartini, and other theorists' ideas for a broader theory of harmonic dualism, termed Riemannian theory. He became invested in the notion of an undertone series as a theoretical basis for the minor triad, despite the fact that undertones are neither naturally audible nor detectable.

=== Ernst Levy's A Theory of Harmony ===
In A Theory of Harmony, Ernst Levy introduced his "polarity theory," where he proposed the term "telluric gravity" to add to the harmonic dualist thought of correlating the major and minor versions of a chord. A prominent development in Levy's work is the relocation of the point of reflection between the major and minor sides: rather than placing it at the root of the chord (i.e. the note C from the Zarlino example), he attributes it to the midpoint between the root and the fifth (i.e. between E♭ and E in the key of C). The term "negative harmony" does not appear in Levy's text.

== Application ==
=== Steve Coleman ===
In the late 1970s or early 1980s, Steve Coleman coined the term negative harmony to describe certain tonal progressions he observed in the playing of saxophonist Von Freeman, as well as in the work of musicians such as Charlie Parker, Art Tatum, John Coltrane, and Sonny Rollins. Eventually, in the 1990s, he linked his idea with Levy's polarity theory. Coleman claims that he shared his concept of negative harmony to music educator Barak Schmool, who taught Jacob Collier.

=== Jacob Collier ===
In the 21st Century, Jacob Collier helped popularize the concept of negative harmony through interviews and masterclass videos on YouTube, in which he references the work of Steve Coleman and Levy. Collier has not explicitly applied the exact methods of negative harmony in his music; rather, he claims to be interested in the element of negative harmony where, as an alternative to moving through chord progressions through perfect cadences (moving counterclockwise around the circle of fifths), he can achieve the same feeling of harmonic resolution and gravity to the tonic through plagal cadences (moving clockwise around the circle of fifths). He summarizes negative harmony as a way to access a deeper catalogue of sounds for developing a more colorful compositional vernacular.
