= Eberhard Sengpiel =

- Born: Berlin, Germany
- Died: 29 August 2014
- Occupation: Sound engineer
- Website: www.sengpielaudio.com

Eberhard Sengpiel (1940 in Berlin – 29 August 2014) was a German sound engineer. He was also a musician in his own right and a lecturer at the Berlin University of the Arts, (Universität der Künste, Berlin) UdK-Berlin.

== Career ==
Sengpiel studied electrical engineering in Berlin (Germany). As a musician, he studied composition and led several dance music bands. He was a development engineer in the field of audio technology and was among the developers of the HiFi standard DIN 45500. As a sound engineer, he worked with pop musicians such as Reinhard Mey, Peter Maffay, and the Fischer Choirs in the field of classical music, he is doing recordings of the New York Philharmonic, the Berlin Philharmonic, the National Symphony Orchestra (Washington, D.C.), the Saint Paul Chamber Orchestra, the Chicago Symphony Orchestra, The Cleveland Orchestra and various famous chamber music artists, to mention only Il Giardino Armonico, Andreas Staier, and Concerto Cologne (Concerto Köln).

He lectured at the Berlin University of the Arts (UdK Berlin – Tonmeister Institute) on microphone recordings and analog and digital sound studio technologies in surround sound and stereo for tonmeister students.

== Grammy Awards ==
Sengpiel has won the following Grammys as a sound engineer:

- 2002 Grammy Award for Best Instrumental Soloist(s) Performance (with orchestra): Richard Strauss: Wind Concertos
  - Horn Concerto No. 1 Dale Clevenger – Horn
  - Strauss: Oboe Concerto Alex Klein – Oboe, Larry Combs – Clarinet, Daniel McGill – Bassoon, Daniel Barenboim – Conductor/Piano, Chicago Symphony Orchestra.
- 2003 Grammy Award for Best Opera Recording: Richard Wagner: Tannhäuser
  - Daniel Barenboim (conductor), Jane Eaglen, Thomas Hampson, Waltraud Meier, René Pape, Peter Seiffert, Choir of the German State Opera of Berlin and the State Orchestra of Berlin (Opera unter den Linden).

== Medal of Honor (Tonmeister) ==
Eberhard Sengpiel received the Medal of Honor from the Association of German Sound Engineers (Verband Deutscher Tonmeister) at the Audio Convention 2010. It was presented in Leipzig by president Carlos Albrecht. This award is given to someone who has done great service to the profession as a sound engineer (Tonmeister) and the audio industry for outstanding services.
