= Undertone series =

Sequence of notes that results from inverting the intervals of the overtone series

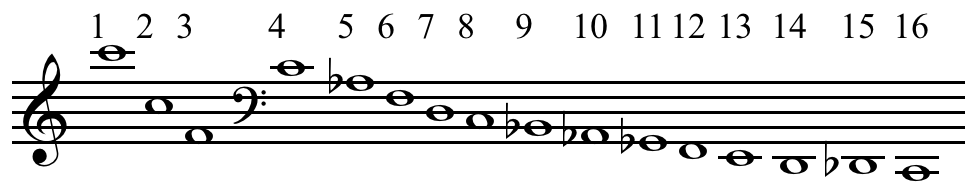
Undertone series on C.

In music, the undertone series or subharmonic series is a sequence of notes that results from inverting the intervals of the overtone series. While overtones naturally occur with the physical production of music on instruments, undertones must be produced in unusual ways. While the overtone series is based upon arithmetic multiplication of frequencies, resulting in a harmonic series, the undertone series is based on arithmetic division.

== Terminology ==
The hybrid term subharmonic is used in music in a few different ways. In its pure sense, the term subharmonic refers strictly to any member of the subharmonic series (1/1, 1/2, 1/3, 1/4, etc.). When the subharmonic series is used to refer to frequency relationships, it is written with f representing some highest known reference frequency (f/1, f/2, f/3, f/4, etc.). As such, one way to define subharmonics is that they are "integral submultiples of the fundamental (driving) frequency". The complex tones of acoustic instruments do not produce partials that resemble the subharmonic series, unless they are played or designed to induce non-linearity. However, such tones can be produced artificially with audio software and electronics. Subharmonics can be contrasted with harmonics. While harmonics can "occur in any linear system", there are "only fairly restricted conditions" that will lead to the "nonlinear phenomenon known as subharmonic generation".

In a second sense, subharmonic does not relate to the subharmonic series, but instead describes an instrumental technique for lowering the pitch of an acoustic instrument below what would be expected for the resonant frequency of that instrument, such as a violin string that is driven and damped by increased bow pressure to produce a fundamental frequency lower than the normal pitch of the same open string. The human voice can also be forced into a similar driven resonance, also called "undertone singing" (which similarly has nothing to do with the undertone series), to extend the range of the voice below what is normally available. However, the frequency relationships of the component partials of the tone produced by the acoustic instrument or voice played in such a way still resemble the harmonic series, not the subharmonic series. In this sense, subharmonic is a term created by reflection from the second sense of the term harmonic, which in that sense refers to an instrumental technique for making an instrument's pitch seem higher than normal by eliminating some lower partials by damping the resonator at the antinodes of vibration of those partials (such as placing a finger lightly on a string at certain locations).

In a very loose third sense, subharmonic is sometimes used or misused to represent any frequency lower than some other known frequency or frequencies, no matter what the frequency relationship is between those frequencies and no matter the method of production.

== Methods for producing an undertone series ==
The overtone series can be produced physically in two ways – either by overblowing a wind instrument, or by dividing a monochord string. If a monochord string is lightly damped at the halfway point, then at 1/3, then 1/4, 1/5, etc., then the string will produce the overtone series, which includes the major triad. If instead, the length of the string is multiplied in the opposite ratios, the undertones series is produced.

Vocal subharmonics or subharmonic singing is a vocal technique that lets singers produce notes below the fundamental and follows the undertone series. It can extend down from the regular vocal range an octave and further below when well controlled. It can be described as having a stable vocal fry-like sound. These pitches are produced by a combination of oscillations of turbulent airflow in the vocal tract. Coming from multiple sound sources such as the true and false vocal cords. Singers often describe it as feeling like stable points below regularly sung notes where it snaps or jumps specific intervals. This technique might also happen by accident when talking or singing in a fry voice.

String quartets by composers George Crumb and Daniel James Wolf, as well as works by violinist and composer Mari Kimura, and Jean-Claude Risset's 1995 work Variants, include undertones, "produced by bowing with great pressure to create pitches below the lowest open string on the instrument."

The tritare, a guitar with Y-shaped strings, cause subharmonics too. This can also be achieved by the extended technique of crossing two strings as some experimental jazz guitarists have developed. Also third bridge preparations on guitars cause timbres consisting of sets of high pitched overtones combined with a subharmonic resonant tone of the unplugged part of the string.

Subharmonics can be produced by signal amplification through loudspeakers. They are also a common effect in both digital and analog signal processing. Octave effect processors synthesize a subharmonic tone at a fixed interval to the input. Subharmonic synthesizer systems used in audio production and mastering work on the same principle.

By a similar token, analog synthesizers such as the Serge synthesizer and many modern Eurorack synthesizers can produce undertone series as a side effect of the solid state timing circuits (e.g. the 555 timer IC) in their envelope generators not being able to re-trigger until their cycle is complete. As an example, sending a clock of period N into an envelope generator where the sum of the rise and fall time is greater than 2 N and less than 3 N would result in an output waveform that tracks at 1/3 of the frequency of the input clock.

== Comparison to the overtone series ==
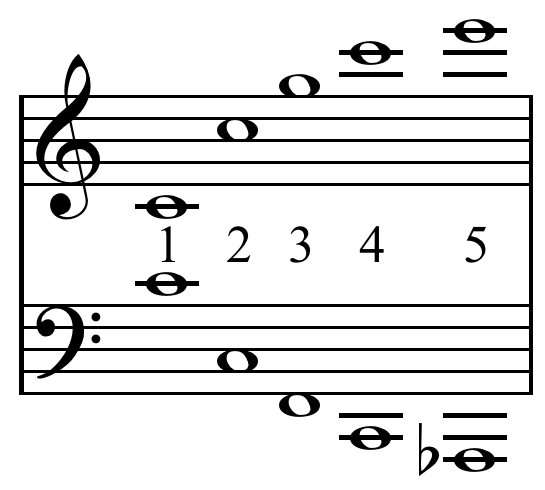
5-limit Otonality and Utonality: overtone and "undertone" series, partials 1–5 numbered OtonalityUtonalityMajor chord on CMinor chord on F

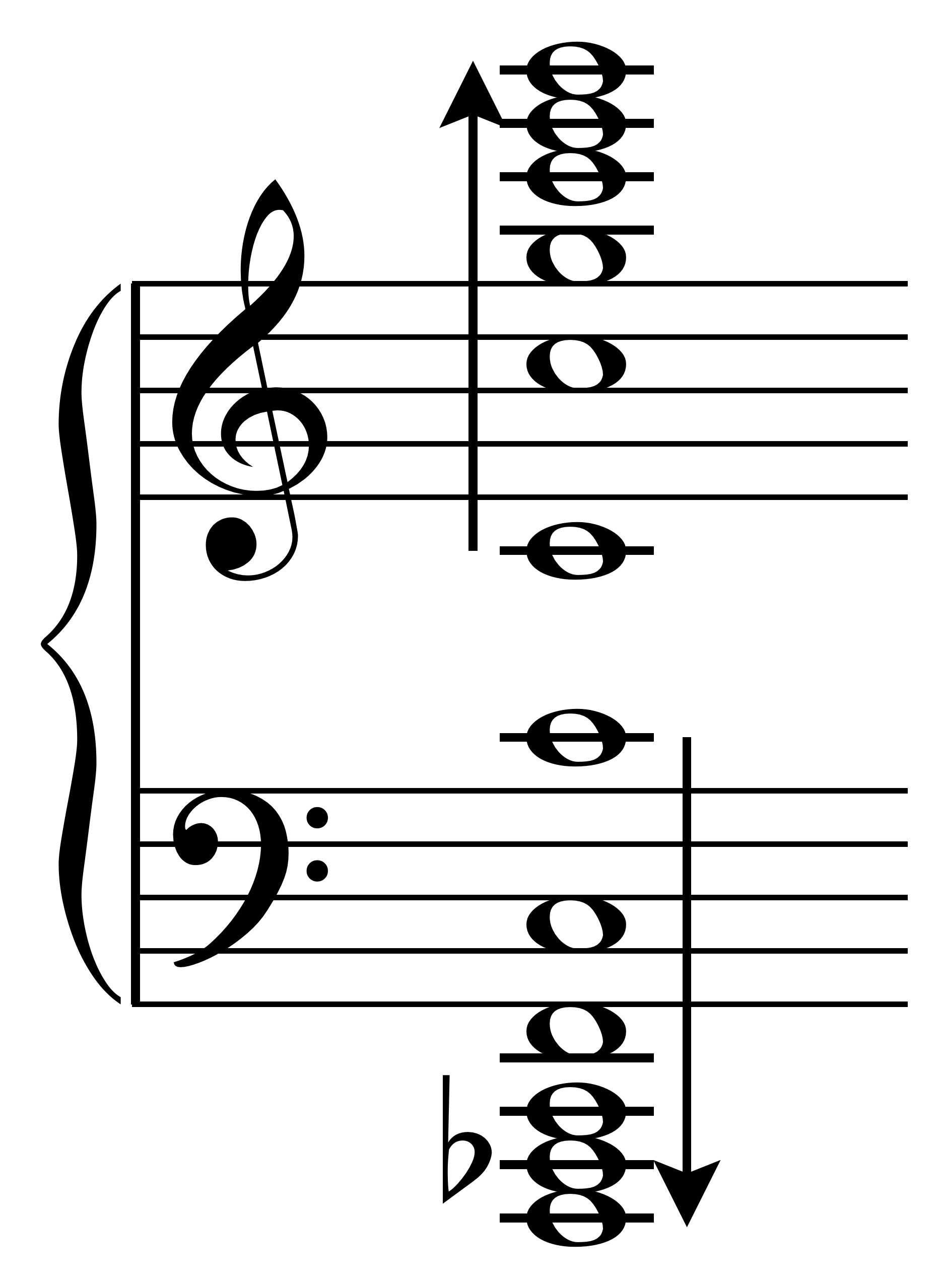
The inversional symmetry of the two series is visible in notation

Subharmonic frequencies are frequencies below the fundamental frequency of an oscillator in a ratio of 1/n, with n a positive integer. For example, if the fundamental frequency of an oscillator is 440 Hz, sub-harmonics include 220 Hz (1/2), ~146.6 Hz (1/3) and 110 Hz (1/4). Thus, they are a mirror image of the harmonic series, the overtone series.

=== Notes in the series ===
In the overtone series, if we consider C as the fundamental, the first five notes that follow are: C (one octave higher), G (perfect fifth higher than previous note), C (perfect fourth higher than previous note), E (major third higher than previous note), and G (minor third higher than previous note).

The pattern occurs in the same manner using the undertone series. Again we will start with C as the fundamental. The first five notes that follow will be: C (one octave lower), F (perfect fifth lower than previous note), C (perfect fourth lower than previous note), A♭ (major third lower than previous note), and F (minor third lower than previous note).

Undertone					12tET interval	Note	Variance (cents)	Audio
1	2	4	8	16	prime (octave)	C	0	
				17	major seventh	B	−5	
			9	18	minor seventh	A♯, B♭	−4	
				19	major sixth	A	+2	
		5	10	20	minor sixth	G♯, A♭	+14	
				21	fifth	G	+29	
			11	22	tritone	F♯, G♭	+49	
				23	tritone	F♯, G♭	−28	
	3	6	12	24	fourth	F	−2	
				25	major third	E	+27	
			13	26	major third	E	−41	
				27	minor third	D♯, E♭	−6	
		7	14	28	major second	D	+31	
				29	major second	D	−30	
			15	30	minor second	C♯, D♭	+12	
				31	minor second	C♯, D♭	−45	

=== Triads ===
If the first five notes of both series are compared, a pattern is seen:

- Overtone series: C C G C E G
- Undertone series: C C F C A♭ F

The undertone series in C contains the F minor triad. Elizabeth Godley argued that the minor triad is also implied by the undertone series and is also a naturally occurring thing in acoustics. "According to this theory the upper and not the lower tone of a minor chord is the generating tone on which the unity of the chord is conditioned." Whereas the major chord consists of a generator with upper major third and perfect fifth, the minor chord consists of a generator with lower major third and fifth.

=== Resonance ===
Hermann von Helmholtz observed in On the Sensations of Tone that the tone of a string tuned to C on a piano changes more noticeably when the notes of its undertone series (C, F, C, A♭, F, D, C, etc.) are struck than those of its overtones. Helmholtz argued that sympathetic resonance is at least as active in under partials as in over partials. Henry Cowell discusses a "Professor Nicolas Garbusov of the Moscow Institute for Musicology" who created an instrument "on which at least the first nine undertones could be heard without the aid of resonators." The phenomenon is described as occurring in resonators of instruments;

"the original sounding body does not produce the undertones but it is difficult to avoid them in resonation ... such resonators under certain circumstances respond to only every other vibration producing a half tone ... even if the resonator responds normally to every vibration ... under other circumstances the body resonates at only every third vibration ... the fact that such underpartials are often audible in music makes them of importance in understanding certain musical relationships ... the subdominant ... the minor triad."

=== Importance in musical composition ===
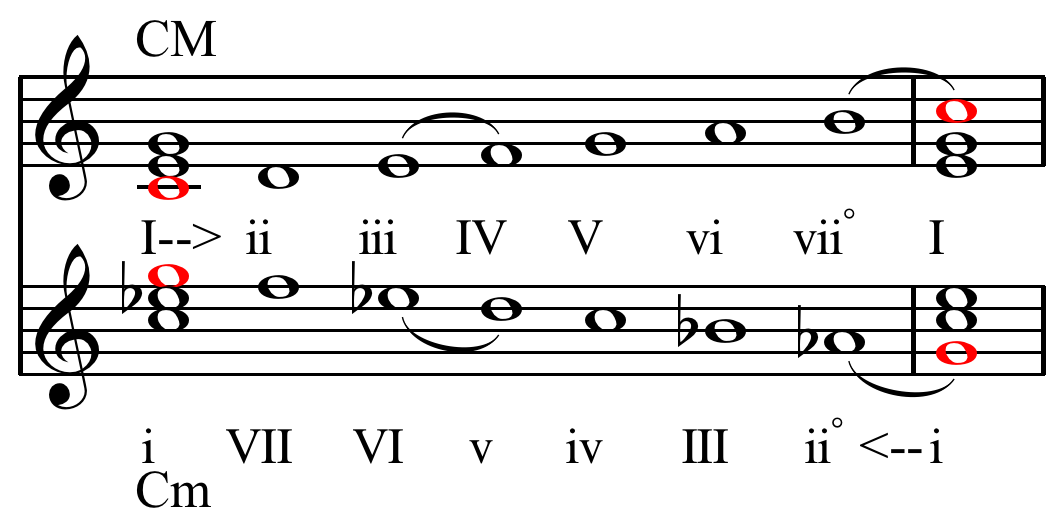
Minor as upside down major

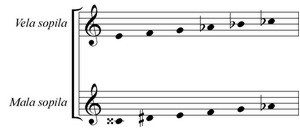
The Istrian scale may be tuned as subharmonics 14 through 7

On D-

First proposed by Zarlino in Instituzione armoniche (1558), the undertone series has been appealed to by theorists such as Riemann and D'Indy to explain phenomena such as the minor chord, that they thought the overtone series would not explain. However, while the overtone series occurs naturally as a result of wave propagation and sound acoustics, musicologists such as Paul Hindemith considered the undertone series to be a purely theoretical 'intervallic reflection' of the overtone series. This assertion rests on the fact that undertones do not sound simultaneously with its fundamental tone as the overtone series does.

In 1868, Adolf von Thimus showed that an indication by a 1st-century Pythagorean, Nicomachus of Gerasa, taken up by Iamblichus in the 4th century, and then worked out by von Thimus, revealed that Pythagoras already had a diagram that could fill a page with interlocking over- and undertone series.

Kathleen Schlesinger pointed out, in 1939, that since the ancient Greek aulos, or reed-blown flute, had holes bored at equal distances, it must have produced a section of the undertone series. She said that this discovery not only cleared up many riddles about the original Greek modes, but indicated that many ancient systems around the world must have also been based on this principle.

One area of conjecture is that the undertone series might be part of the compositional design phase of the compositional process. The overtone and undertone series can be considered two different arrays, with smaller arrays that contain different major and minor triads. Most experiments with undertones to date have focused largely upon improvisation and performance not compositional design (for example the recent use of negative harmony in jazz, popularised by Jacob Collier and stemming from the research of Ernst Levy), although in 1985/86 Jonathan Parry used what he called the Inverse Harmonic Series (identical to the Undertone Series) as one stage in his process of Harmonic Translation.

Harry Partch argued that the overtone series and the undertone series are equally fundamental, and his concepts of Otonality and Utonality is based on this idea.

Similarly, in 2006 G.H. Jackson suggested that the overtone and undertone series must be seen as a real polarity, representing on the one hand the outer "material world" and on the other, our subjective "inner world". This view is largely based on the fact that the overtone series has been accepted because it can be explained by materialistic science, while the prevailing conviction about the undertone series is that it can only be achieved by taking subjective experience seriously. For instance, the minor triad is usually heard as sad, or at least pensive, because humans habitually hear all chords as based from below. If feelings are instead based on the high "fundamental" of an undertone series, then descending into a minor triad is not felt as melancholy, but rather as overcoming, conquering something. The overtones, by contrast, are then felt as penetrating from outside. Using Rudolf Steiner's work, Jackson traces the history of these two series, as well as the main other system created by the circle of fifths, and argues that in hidden form, the series are balanced out in Bach's harmony.

== See also ==
- Combination tone
- Harmonic
- Missing fundamental
- Overtone
- Riemannian theory
- Subharmonic mixer
- Subharmonic synthesizer
