= Exciter (effect) =

Audio signal processing technique

An exciter (also called a harmonic exciter or aural exciter) is an audio signal processing technique used to enhance a signal by dynamic equalization, phase manipulation, harmonic synthesis of (usually) high frequency signals, and through the addition of subtle harmonic distortion. Dynamic equalization involves variation of the equalizer characteristics in the time domain as a function of the input. Due to the varying nature, noise is reduced compared to static equalizers. Harmonic synthesis involves the creation of higher order harmonics from the fundamental frequency signals present in the recording. As noise is usually more prevalent at higher frequencies, the harmonics are derived from a purer frequency band resulting in clearer highs. Exciters are also used to synthesize harmonics of low frequency signals to simulate deep bass in smaller speakers.

Originally made in valve (tube) based equipment, they are now implemented as part of a digital signal processor, often trying to emulate analogue exciters. Exciters are mostly found as plug-ins for sound editing software and in sound enhancement processors.

== Aphex aural exciter ==
The Aphex aural exciter was one of the first exciter effects. The effect was developed in the mid-1970s by Aphex Electronics. The aural exciter adds phase shift and musically related synthesized harmonics to audio signals. The first Aural Exciter units were available in the mid-1970s, exclusively on the rental basis of $30 per minute of finished recorded time. In the 1970s, certain recording artists, including Anne Murray, Neil Diamond, Jackson Browne, The Four Seasons, Olivia Newton-John, Linda Ronstadt and James Taylor stated in their liner notes "This album was recorded using the Aphex Aural Exciter."

Aphex started selling the professional units, and introduced two low-cost models: Type B and Type C. The Aural Exciter circuit is now licensed by a growing list of manufacturers, including Yamaha, MacKenzie, Gentner, E-mu Systems and Bogen. The original Aphex Aural Exciter, first offered in 1975, came without the Big Bottom circuit, which was added in 1992. Later revisions of the Aphex Aural Exciter included the Model 104 Type C and Type C2 units. The 2001 Model 204 Aural Exciter and Optical Big Bottom is Aphex' another refinement of the original unit. According to Aphex, the Model 204 updates the Aural Exciter and Big Bottom processor blocks with improved circuitry, including an optical gain-control element for the Big Bottom compressor.

=== Method of operation of the Aphex Aural Exciter ===
The basic principle of operation of the original Aphex exciter is covered by US patent 4150253, "Signal distortion circuit and method of use" by Kurt A. Knoppel, assigned to Aphex Systems Limited.

The invention is summarized as a method and apparatus for electronically processing sound, in which:

"An electrical signal derived from audio information is split up into two separate signal paths. The signal travelling along one path is passed through an exciter circuit and an attenuator and is then combined with the signal travelling along the other path. [...] The exciter circuit is made up basically of a high pass filter and a harmonic creator. The harmonic creator is designed to create low order, odd and even harmonics of frequencies whose amplitudes are above a preselected threshold level. Two versions of the exciter circuit are disclosed, one containing vacuum tubes and the other solid state. The quality and various other characteristics of sound that is processed according to this invention are believed to be greatly enhanced."

The story of the invention, as told by Aphex president Marvin Caesar in 1993, was that Knoppel discovered the principle of operation from analysing the behavior of a broken Heathkit amplifier. Subsequent versions of the exciter added phase-dependent elements to the device.

== Other brands ==
Functionally similar units from competing manufacturers are generically known either as "psychoacoustic processors", "psychoacoustic exciters", "harmonic exciters", or "enhancers". In the 1990s and 2000s, broadly comparable products became available from BBE, Joemeek, SPL and Behringer. Most are analogue signal processors, although a few digital units began to appear in the 2000s. The BBE Sonic Maximiser uses a similar process of frequency-dependent phase shifting, as do other brands to a varying extent.

== Uses ==
- Making vocals sound more "breathy".
- Enhancing dull recordings, especially analog reel-to-reel tape recordings that have lost their "sparkle" due to repeated overdubs
- Restoring old recordings by simulating lost spectral content
- As an audio enhancement for hardware and software media players
- Exciters are sometimes sold in a "stompbox" pedal format, in units designed for use with an electric guitar, electric bass, or electronic keyboards

== See also ==
- Spectral band replication
- Subharmonic enhancer
