= Aphex Systems =

Brand of audio processing equipment

Aphex is a brand of audio signal processing equipment. Aphex Systems was founded in 1975 in Massachusetts. The name is shorthand for "Audio Perception Heterodyne Exciter", in reference to its original product, the Aphex Aural Exciter. The company changed its name to Aphex in 2010.

== About Aphex ==
Formerly Aphex Systems, the company was acquired in mid-2015 by Freedman Electronics, parent company of Røde Microphones.

Aphex moved in 2011 to Burbank, California, and in 2014 moved its main offices to Salt Lake City, Utah. Aphex manufactures pro audio products, primarily in the Burbank and L.A. area, with a few products manufactured in Asia. Aphex has design and engineering facilities located in Salt Lake City and California.

Aphex builds products for the professional audio, broadcast, fixed installation, touring-sound and home-recording markets. It has developed a number of technologies and products, such as the Aural Exciter, Compellor, Dominator, Expander/Gate and Expressor, plus the Model 1100 Two-Channel and Model 1788 Eight-Channel Ultra-Precision Remotely Controllable Microphone Pre-Amplifiers, and the Model 2020 Mk III Broadcast Audio Processor. A key element of all the dynamics processing products is the voltage-controlled attenuator, the Aphex VCA 1001. Another key element is Aphex' input and output circuitry, using electronic balancing techniques instead of transformers. In late 2000, Aphex introduced a digital signal transport product, the Anaconda 64-Channel Bidirectional Digital Snake.

Today, Aphex is focused on its latest Exciter and Big Bottom processing and Compellor compression technologies, with new patents pending and new products in the line. Key among these are a series of USB connected products:

- Microphone X - a USB mic with Aphex Aural Exciter, Big Bottom and Compression technology built in.
- IN2 - a USB computer interface with Aphex amplification and processing built in, allowing music and voice to be converted to digital and taken into the computer work place (Pro Tools, etc.)
- USB Rack 500 - a USB connected 500 Series rack allowing 500 Series modules to go directly into the computer DAW.
- 500 Series Modules - Aphex also offers a variety of 500 dries modules that bring Aphex processing technologies to the 500 Series user.
- 19-inch rack products – Aphex still makes a variety of professional rack products for studio, live and broadcast applications.

== Effects ==
The Aural Exciter adds phase shift and musically related synthesized harmonics to audio signals.

The Big Bottom circuit combines a low-pass filter and dynamics processor to compress and delay incoming low-frequency information. The process is reverse amplitude dependent, meaning that more is applied as the input level drops and less as the signal gets hotter. Together the dynamics processor and time delay create sustained bass frequencies that are perceived as being louder yet do not noticeably increase peak output.

Aphex started selling the professional units, and introduced two low-cost models: Type B and Type C. The Aural Exciter circuit is now licensed by several manufacturers. The so-called Big Bottom circuit was added in 1992. Later revisions of the Aphex Aural Exciter included the Model 104 Type C and Type C2 units. The most recent version is the Model EXCITER Aural Exciter and Optical Big Bottom.

Functionally similar units from competing manufacturers are generically known either as 'psychoacoustic processors' or more commonly just as 'enhancers'. Broadly comparable products are now available from BBE, Joemeek, SPL, and Behringer, implemented using either analogue or digital hardware, or software.

=== Applications ===
Aphex has also released several audio effects apps that apply the Aphex processing to digital music in iTunes.

== In popular culture ==
The musician Aphex Twin was named after the company.

== Licensing ==
Aphex continues to expand its licensing activities and has contracts with a variety of audio, music and other OEMs.
