= Subharchord =

Electronic musical instrument

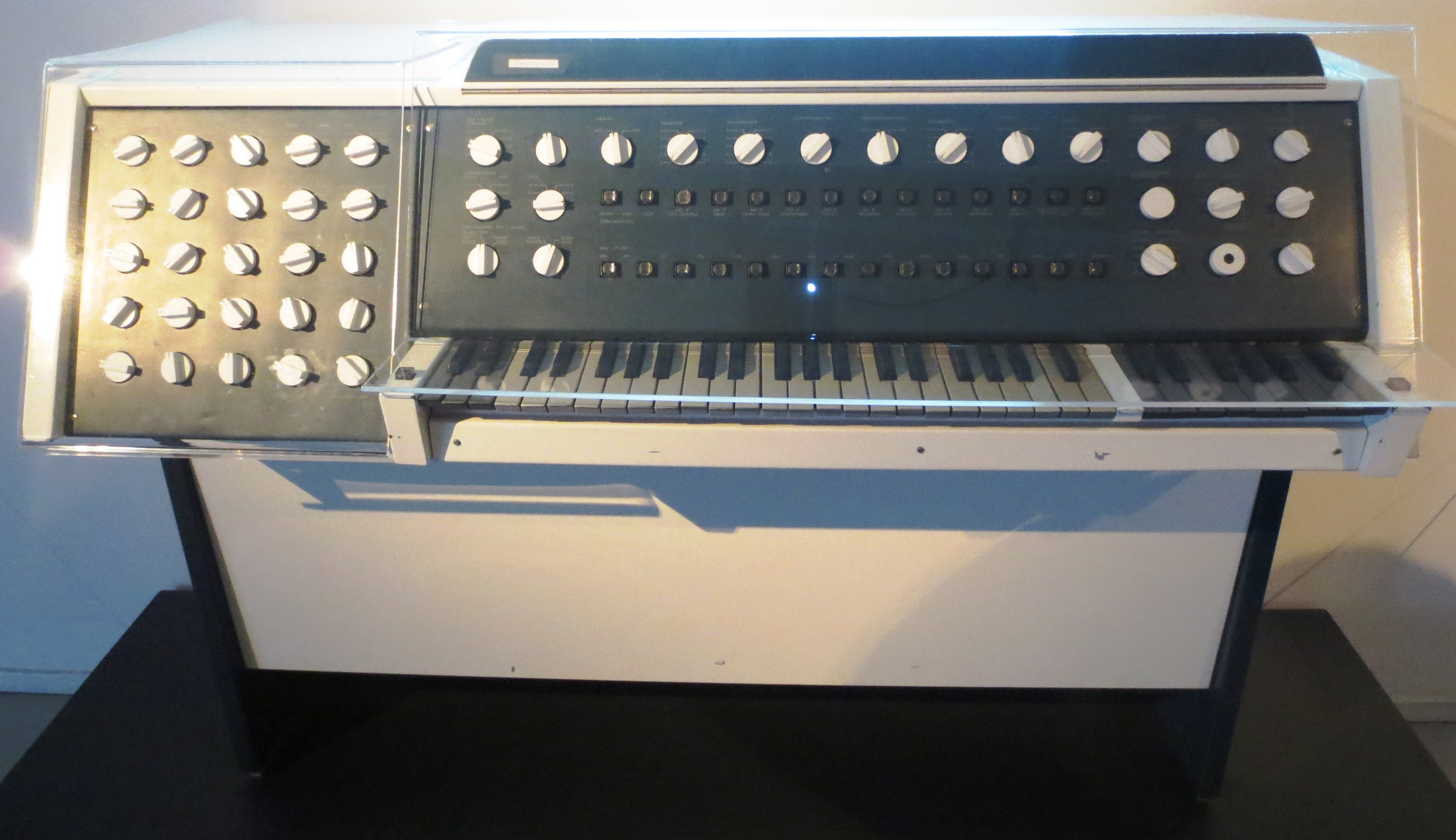
Subharchord (1968) exhibited at Norsk Teknisk Museum, Oslo

The Subharchord is a synthesizer featuring subharmonic synthesis. It was developed in the mid-20th century by technicians in the German Democratic Republic.

== Background ==
The first fully electronic compositions were written in Germany in the 1950s, influenced by musique concrète. In Germany, new music was composed and experiments conducted on electronic equipment that often came originally from physics labs or radio. Development in the German Democratic Republic (GDR) in the east and the Federal Republic of Germany (FRG) in the west differed considerably, as each state defined its own cultural policy.

One result was that young artists and musicians, who saw themselves as the avant-garde, were valued and tolerated differently in the two states; it was easier for musicians in the West to remain independent and experiment without interference. For example, at the Studio for Electronic Music at the Westdeutscher Rundfunk (WDR) in Cologne, many new works were written by composers such as Herbert Eimert, Karlheinz Stockhausen, and Gottfried Michael Koenig. The publications that came out of the WDR studio found an international audience. Experiments with musical structures and technical innovations were also taking place in studios in Milan, Rome, Eindhoven, Brussels, Gravesano, and New York.

== Invention ==
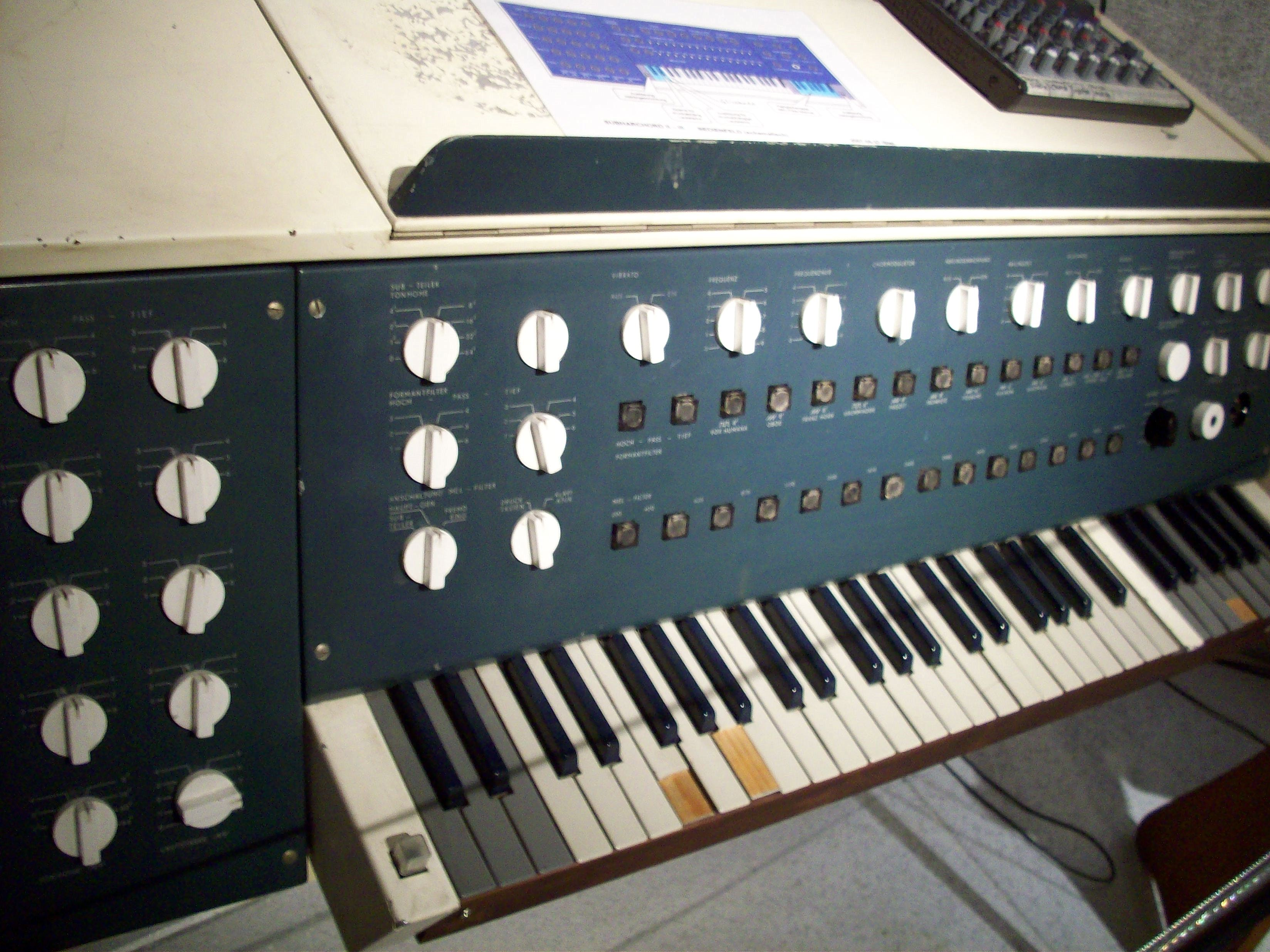
Subharchord II (1968)

In the late 1950s, technical experts at the Labor für Akustisch-Musikalische Grenzprobleme (English: Laboratory for Problems at the Acoustics/Music Interface) were tasked by the GDR with research and development related to electronic sound generation. After traveling to other European cities with similar programs, the engineers began developing a sound-generating device intended to be a compact sound lab and centerpiece of an electronic music studio, to give East German composers an instrument to work with that was technologically superior to the equipment available in the Western world.

The Subharchord, whose design originated from the Trautonium and Mixturtrautonium, utilized the nascent technology of microelectronics, and was based on the mixing of so-called subharmonic sounds. In contrast to the Mixturtrautonium, the Subharchord has a keyboard and is played like an organ, whereas the Mixturtrautonium's manual is a resistor wire over a metal plate, which is pressed at various points to create sound, like a ribbon-controller. In addition, the Subharchord possesses considerably more possibilities than the Mixturtrautonium for generating and manipulating sounds.

In total, only seven subharchords ever existed. In 1970, a private company acquired the rights to manufacture the Subharchord commercially, but the DDR halted its production and ceased further development. One remained at the Funkhaus Berlin, while others went to Norway, Czechoslovakia, and Dresden. Today, the last four remaining Subharchords are in museums in Berlin, Vienna, Prague, and Trondheim.

== Rediscovery ==
In 2000, while researching the history of electronic music instruments, Berlin artist and musician Manfred Miersch, a visual artist who works with historical and sometimes forgotten electronic musical instruments, rediscovered the Subharchord. Miersch published a four-part series in the German magazine Keyboards in 2003 and built a website to promote the Subharchord to a wider audience.

In 2005, the Berlin Academy of Arts had an exhibition named Archives in which they invited five artists to work with the academy's archives. As a result, from June 18th until August 29th of that year, Carsten Nicolai (a.k.a. Alva Noto) exhibited Sub Vision, an audio/visual piece based on sounds of a prototype Subharchord from the academy's archives.

In 2007, Casten Seiffarth, Director of the Tesla Media Art Lab Berlin, commissioned Wekstatt Klangapparate (Workshop Sound Apparatus), inviting four artists to re-contextualize historic sound devices. Frank Bretschneider and Benzo were to prepare performances with the Subharchord. A Subharchord at Funkhaus Berlin was renovated and loaned to the Tesla studio for six months. The Kippschwingungen performance was released as an eight-track album in 2012.

On February 2, 2013 at the CTM Festival in Berlin, an afternoon was dedicated to the instrument, with performances and lectures by Bretschneider, Biosphere, and Frederic Rzewski.

On June 1 2024, Miersch and Kalma participated in the Berlin Academy of Arts' Nodes Festival for Electroacoustic Music and Sound Art with a live performance featuring the subharchord.

== See also ==
- Subharmonic synthesizer
- Electroacoustic music
