= Daniel Barenboim =

Argentine-born pianist and conductor (born 1942)

- דניאל בארנבוים · دانيال بارنبويم
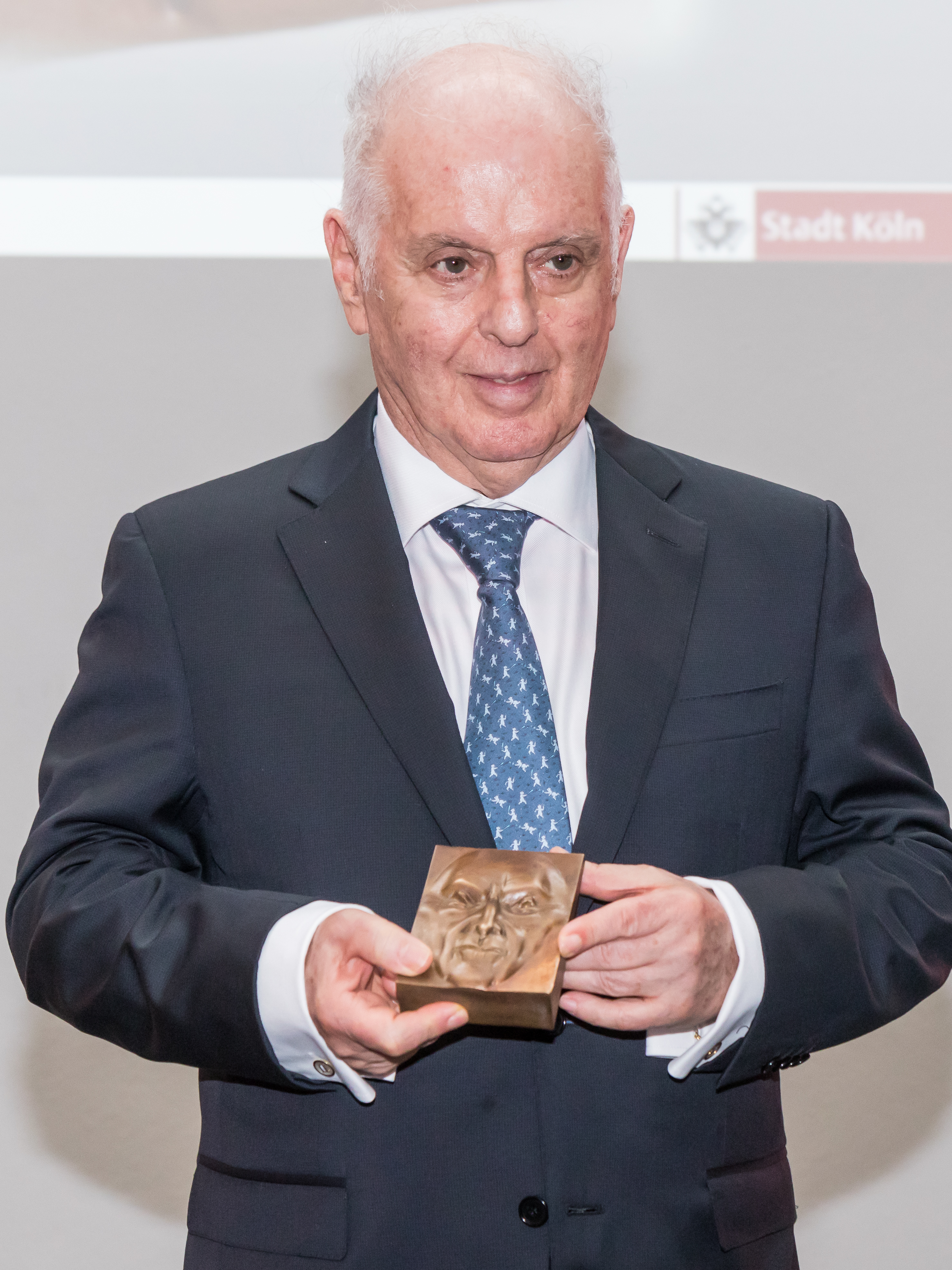
- Barenboim receiving the 2019 Konrad Adenauer Prize from the City of Cologne
- Born: Daniel Moses Barenboim; 15 November 1942 (age 84); Buenos Aires, Argentina
- Citizenship: Argentina; Israel; Palestine; Spain
- Occupations: Pianist; conductor
- Years active: 1952–present
- Spouses: Jacqueline du Pré (m. 1967; died 1987) Elena Bashkirova (m. 1988)
- Children: 2
- Daniel Barenboim's voice from the BBC Reith Lecture, 7 April 2006.

YouTube information
- Channel: Daniel Barenboim
- Years active: 2016–present
- Genre: Classical music
- Subscribers: 127 thousand
- Views: 45 million
- Last updated: 1 May 2026
- Website: danielbarenboim.com

Signature
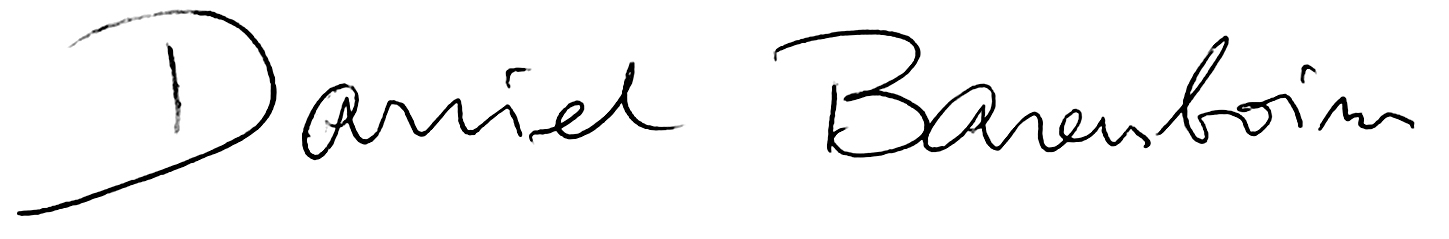

Daniel Moses Barenboim (Hebrew: דניאל בארנבוים, Arabic: دانيال بارنبويم; born 15 November 1942) is an Argentinian-born classical pianist and conductor with Spanish, Israeli and Palestinian citizenship. From 1992 until January 2023, Barenboim was the general music director of the Berlin State Opera and "Staatskapellmeister" of its orchestra, the Staatskapelle Berlin.

Barenboim previously served as music director of the Chicago Symphony Orchestra, the Orchestre de Paris and La Scala in Milan, and he is also the founder, along with Palestinian-American scholar Edward Said, of the West–Eastern Divan Orchestra. Barenboim has received many awards and prizes, including seven Grammy awards, an honorary Knight Commander of the Order of the British Empire, France's Legion of Honour as a Commander, Grand Officier and Grand Cross, the Grand Cross of the Order of Merit of the Federal Republic of Germany, and Spain's Prince of Asturias Concord Award.

Barenboim is the only publicly documented person to hold citizenship in both Israel and Palestine. He is a critic of the Israeli occupation of Palestinian territories, and is prominent in working to promote dialogue between Israelis and Palestinians.

== Biography ==
Barenboim, aged 11, with composer Eithan Lustig and the Gadna Youth orchestra (1953)

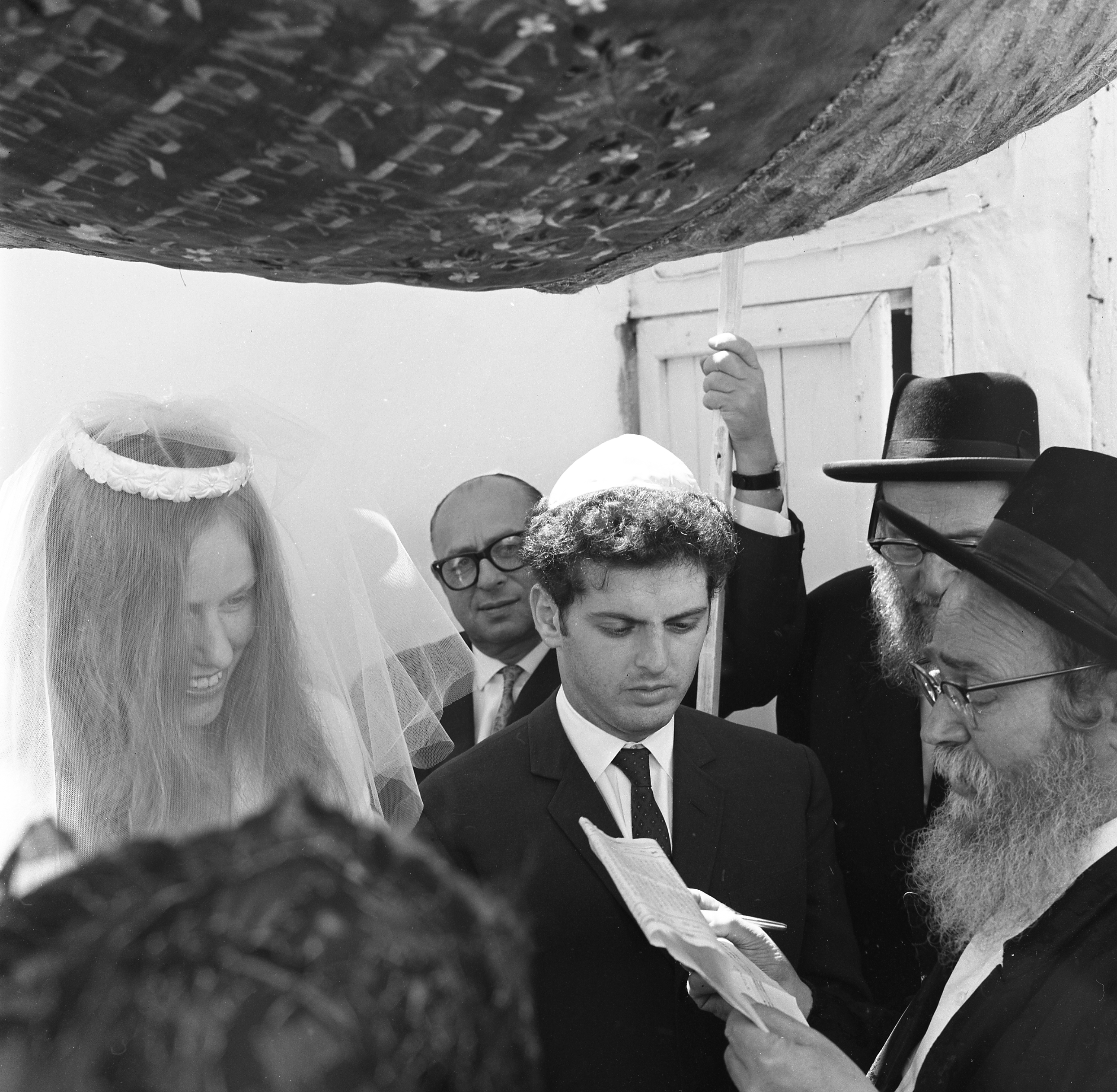
Wedding of Jacqueline du Pré and Barenboim in Jerusalem, 1967. Beno Rothenberg, Meitar collection, National Library of Israel

Daniel Barenboim was born on 15 November 1942 in Buenos Aires, Argentina, to Jewish parents Aida (née Schuster) and Enrique Barenboim, both professional pianists. He started piano lessons at the age of five with his mother, continuing to study with his father, who remained his only teacher. On 19 August 1950, at the age of seven, he gave his first formal concert, in Buenos Aires.

In 1952, Barenboim's family moved to Israel. Two years later, in the summer of 1954, his parents took him to Salzburg to take part in Igor Markevitch's conducting classes. During that summer he also met and played for Wilhelm Furtwängler, who has remained a central musical influence and ideal for Barenboim. Furtwängler called the young Barenboim a "phenomenon" and invited him to perform the Beethoven First Piano Concerto with the Berlin Philharmonic, but Barenboim's father considered it too soon after the Second World War for a Jewish boy to go to Germany. He attended Tichon Hadash high school in Tel Aviv. In 1955, Barenboim studied harmony and composition with Nadia Boulanger in Paris.

On 15 June 1967, Barenboim and British cellist Jacqueline du Pré were married in Jerusalem at a Western Wall ceremony, du Pré having converted to Judaism. Acting as one of the witnesses was the conductor Zubin Mehta, a long-time friend of Barenboim. "Since I was not Jewish I had to temporarily be renamed Moshe Cohen, which made me a 'kosher witness'", Mehta recalled. Du Pré retired from music in 1973, after being diagnosed with multiple sclerosis (MS). The marriage lasted until du Pré's death in 1987.

In the early 1980s, Barenboim and Russian pianist Elena Bashkirova started a relationship. Together they had two sons, both born in Paris before du Pré's death: David Arthur, born 1983, and Michael, born 1985. Barenboim worked to keep his relationship with Bashkirova hidden from du Pré, and believed he had succeeded. He and Bashkirova married in 1988. Both sons are part of the music world: David Barenboim is a manager-writer for the German hip-hop band Level 8, and Michael Barenboim is a classical violinist.

=== Citizenship ===
Barenboim holds citizenship in Argentina, Israel, Palestine, and Spain, and was the first person to hold Palestinian and Israeli citizenship simultaneously. He lives in Berlin.

== Career ==
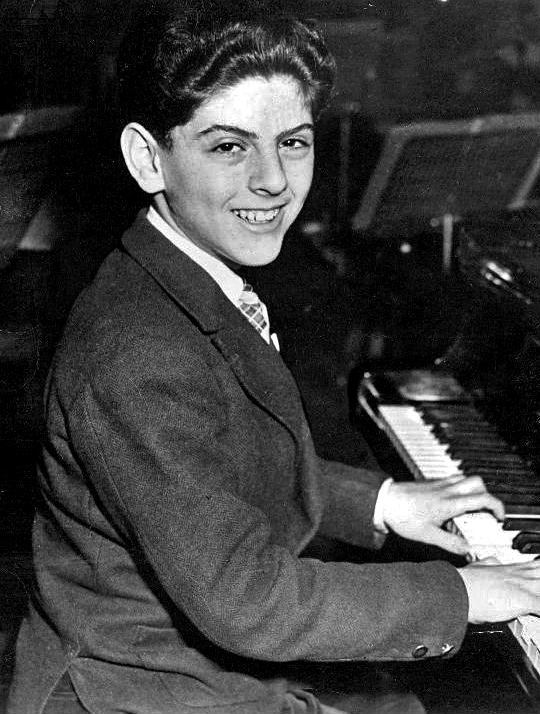
U.S. concert performance at the age of 15 (January 1958)

After performing in Buenos Aires, Barenboim made his international debut as a pianist at the age of 10 in 1952 in Vienna and Rome. In 1955, he performed in Paris, in 1956, in London, and in 1957 in New York under the baton of Leopold Stokowski. Regular concert tours of Europe, the United States, South America, Australia and the Far East followed thereafter.

In June 1967, Barenboim and his then-fiancée Jacqueline du Pré gave concerts in Jerusalem, Tel Aviv, Haifa and Beersheba before and during the Six-Day War. His friendship with musicians Itzhak Perlman, Zubin Mehta, and Pinchas Zukerman, and marriage to du Pré led to the 1969 film by Christopher Nupen of their performance of the Schubert "Trout" Quintet.

Following his debut as a conductor with the English Chamber Orchestra in Abbey Road Studios, London, in 1966, Barenboim was invited to conduct by many European and American symphony orchestras. Between 1975 and 1989, he was music director of the Orchestre de Paris, where he often conducted contemporary music.

Barenboim made his opera conducting debut in 1973 with a performance of Mozart's Don Giovanni at the Edinburgh Festival. He made his debut at Bayreuth in 1981, conducting there regularly until 1999. In 1988, he was appointed artistic and musical director of the Opéra Bastille in Paris, scheduled to open in 1990, but was fired in January 1989 by the opera's chairman Pierre Bergé. Barenboim was named music director designate of the Chicago Symphony Orchestra in 1989 and succeeded Sir Georg Solti as its music director in 1991, a post he held until 17 June 2006. He expressed frustration with the need for fund-raising duties in the United States as part of being a music director of an American orchestra.

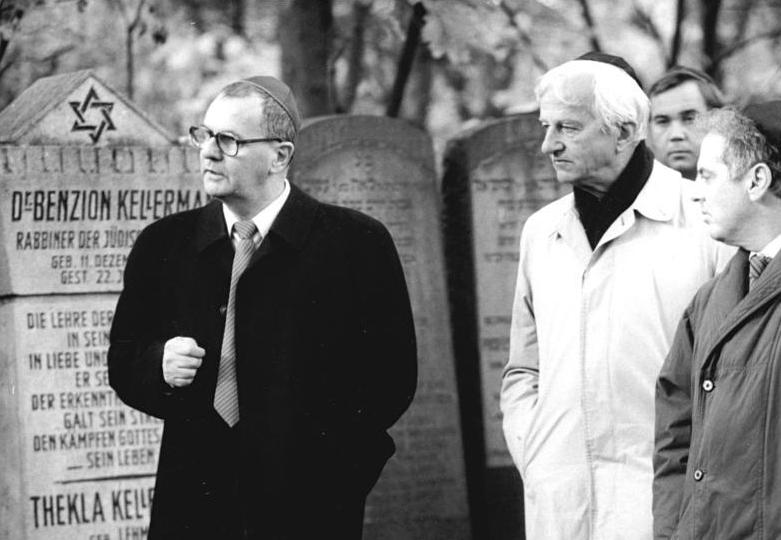
(l-r) President of the East Berlin Jewish Community Peter Kirchner, President of the Federal Republic of Germany Richard von Weizsäcker, and Barenboim visit Jewish cemetery in Berlin-Weissensee (1990)

In 1992, Barenboim became music director of the Berlin State Opera and the Staatskapelle Berlin, succeeding in maintaining the independent status of the State Opera. He has tried to maintain the orchestra's traditional sound and style. In autumn 2000 he was made conductor for life of the Staatskapelle Berlin.

On 15 May 2006, Barenboim was named principal guest conductor of La Scala opera house, in Milan, after Riccardo Muti's resignation. He subsequently became music director of La Scala in 2011.

In 2006, Barenboim presented the BBC Reith Lectures, presenting a series of five lectures titled In the Beginning was Sound. The lectures on music were recorded in a range of cities, including London, Chicago, Berlin, and two in Jerusalem. In the autumn of 2006, Barenboim gave the Charles Eliot Norton Lectures at Harvard University, entitling his talk Sound and Thought.

In November 2006, Lorin Maazel submitted Barenboim's name as his nominee to succeed him as the New York Philharmonic's music director. Barenboim said he was flattered but "nothing could be further from my thoughts at the moment than the possibility of returning to the United States for a permanent position", repeating in April 2007 his lack of interest in the New York Philharmonic's music directorship or its newly created principal conductor position. Barenboim made his conducting debut on 28 November 2008 at the Metropolitan Opera in New York for the House's 450th performance of Wagner's Tristan und Isolde.

In 2009, Barenboim conducted the Vienna New Year's Concert of the Vienna Philharmonic for the first time. In his New Year message, he expressed the hope that 2009 would be a year for peace and for human justice in the Middle East. He returned to conduct the 2014 Vienna New Year's Concert, and also conducted the 2022 Concert.

In 2014, construction began on the Barenboim–Said Academy in Berlin. A joint project Barenboim developed with Palestinian-American scholar Edward Said, the academy was planned as a site for young music students from the Arab world and Israel to study music and humanities in Berlin. It opened its doors on 8 December 2016. In 2017, the Pierre Boulez Saal opened as the public face of the academy. The elliptical shaped concert hall was designed by Frank Gehry. Acoustician Yasuhisa Toyota created the hall's sound profile.

In 2015, Barenboim unveiled a new concert grand piano, named "Straight Strung Concert Grand." Designed by Chris Maene with support from Steinway & Sons, the piano features straight parallel strings instead of the conventional diagonally-crossed strings of a modern Steinway.

In 2018, Barenboim was the subject of the French animated series Max & Maestro.

In 2020, Barenboim curated the digital festival of new music "Distance / Intimacy" with flautist Emmanuel Pahud in the Pierre Boulez Saal. At their invitation ten contemporary composers, among them Jörg Widmann, Olga Neuwirth and Matthias Pintscher, contributed new works engaging artistically with the COVID-19 pandemic. All participating composers and musicians waived their fees, inviting listeners to financially support arts and culture.

In October 2022, Barenboim announced on social media that he would be reducing his conducting and other engagements for health reasons. On 6 January 2023, the Staatsoper Unter den Linden announced Barenboim's resignation as its Generalmusikdirektor, effective 31 January 2023, because of health reasons.

On 6 February 2025, Daniel Barenboim announced in his official Instagram page that he has Parkinson's disease.

== Musical style ==
Barenboim has rejected some current musicological research, such as the authentic performance movement. His recording of Beethoven's symphonies shows his preference for some conventional twentieth-century practices, rather than fully adhering to Bärenreiter's new edition (edited by Jonathan Del Mar). Barenboim has opposed the practice of choosing the tempo of a piece based on historical evidence, such as the composer's metronome marks. He argues instead for finding the tempo from within the music, especially from its harmony and harmonic rhythm. He has reflected this in the general tempi chosen in his recording of Beethoven's symphonies, usually adhering to early-twentieth-century practices. He has not been influenced by the faster tempos chosen by other conductors such as David Zinman and authentic movement advocate Roger Norrington.

In his recording of The Well-Tempered Clavier, Barenboim makes frequent use of the right-foot sustaining pedal, a device absent from the keyboard instruments of Bach's time (although the harpsichord was highly resonant), producing a sonority very different from the "dry" and often staccato sound favoured by Glenn Gould. Moreover, in the fugues, he often plays one voice considerably louder than the others, a practice impossible on a harpsichord. According to some scholarship, this practice began in Beethoven's time (see, for example, Matthew Dirst's book Engaging Bach). When justifying his interpretation of Bach, Barenboim claims that he is interested in the long tradition of playing Bach that has existed for two and a half centuries, rather than in the exact style of performance in Bach's time:

The study of old instruments and historic performance practice has taught us a great deal, but the main point, the impact of harmony, has been ignored. This is proved by the fact that tempo is described as an independent phenomenon. It is claimed that one of Bach's gavottes must be played fast and another one slowly. But tempo is not independent! ... I think that concerning oneself purely with historic performance practice and the attempt to reproduce the sound of older styles of music-making is limiting and no indication of progress. Mendelssohn and Schumann tried to introduce Bach into their own period, as did Liszt with his transcriptions and Busoni with his arrangements. In America Leopold Stokowski also tried to do it with his arrangements for orchestra. This was always the result of "progressive" efforts to bring Bach closer to the particular period. I have no philosophical problem with someone playing Bach and making it sound like Boulez. My problem is more with someone who tries to imitate the sound of that time ...

=== Recordings ===
In the beginning of his career, Barenboim concentrated on music of the classical era, as well as some romantic composers. He made his first recording in 1954. Notable classical recordings include the complete cycles of Mozart and Beethoven's piano sonatas, Mozart's piano concertos (conducting the English Chamber Orchestra from the piano), and Beethoven's piano concertos (with Otto Klemperer and Arthur Rubinstein, and conducting the Berlin Philharmonic and the Staatskapelle Berlin from the piano). Romantic recordings include Brahms's piano concertos (with John Barbirolli, Zubin Mehta and Gustavo Dudamel), Liszt's piano concertos (with Pierre Boulez), Chopin's piano concertos (with Andris Nelsons) and Nocturnes, and Mendelssohn's Songs Without Words.

Barenboim also recorded many chamber works, especially in collaboration with his first wife, the cellist Jacqueline du Pré, as well as the violinist Itzhak Perlman, and the violinist and violist Pinchas Zukerman. Noted performances include: the complete Mozart violin sonatas (with Perlman), Beethoven's violin sonatas (with Zukerman), Brahms's violin sonatas (with Perlman and Zukerman), Beethoven's and Brahms's cello sonatas (with du Pré), Brahms's viola sonatas (with Zukerman), Schubert's violin sonatas (with Isaac Stern), Brahms's clarinet sonatas (with Gervase de Peyer), Beethoven's and Tchaikovsky's piano trios (with du Pré and Zukerman), and Schubert's Trout Quintet (with du Pré, Perlman, Zukerman, and Zubin Mehta).

Notable recordings as a conductor include the complete symphonies of Beethoven, Brahms, Bruckner, Schubert, and Schumann; the Da Ponte operas of Mozart; numerous operas by Wagner, including the complete Ring Cycle; and various concertos. Barenboim has written about his changing attitude to the music of Mahler; he has recorded Mahler's Fifth, Seventh, and Ninth symphonies and Das Lied von der Erde. He has also performed and recorded the Concierto de Aranjuez by Rodrigo and Villa-Lobos guitar concerto with John Williams as the guitar soloist.

By the late 1990s, Barenboim had widened his concert repertoire, performing works by baroque as well as twentieth-century classical composers. Examples include: J. S. Bach's The Well-Tempered Clavier (which he has played since childhood) and Goldberg Variations, Albeniz's Iberia, and Debussy's Préludes. In addition, he turned to other musical genres, such as jazz, and the folk music of his birthplace, Argentina. He conducted the 2006 New Year's Eve concert in Buenos Aires, in which tangos were played.

Barenboim has continued to perform and record chamber music, sometimes with members of the orchestras he has led. Some examples include the Quartet for the End of Time by Messiaen with members of the Orchestre de Paris during his tenure there, Richard Strauss with members of the Chicago Symphony Orchestra, and Mozart's Clarinet Trio with members of the Berlin Staatskapelle.

To mark Barenboim's 75th birthday, Deutsche Grammophon released a box set of 39 CDs of his solo recordings, and Sony Classical issued a box set of Barenboim's orchestral recordings on 43 CDs and three DVDs in 2017, Daniel Barenboim – A Retrospective.

=== Conducting Wagner in Israel ===
The Israel Philharmonic Orchestra (then Palestine Orchestra) had performed Richard Wagner's music in Mandatory Palestine even during the early days of the Nazi era. But after the Kristallnacht, Jewish musicians avoided playing Wagner's music in Israel because of how Nazi Germany made use of the composer and because of Wagner's own antisemitic writings, initiating an unofficial boycott.

This informal ban continued when Israel was founded in 1948, but from time to time unsuccessful efforts were made to end it. In 1974 and again in 1981 Zubin Mehta planned to (but did not) lead the Israel Philharmonic Orchestra in works of Wagner. During the latter occasion, fist fights broke out in the audience.

Barenboim, who had been selected to head the production of Wagner's operas at the 1988 Bayreuth Festival, had since at least 1989 publicly opposed the Israeli ban. In that year, he had the Israel Philharmonic "rehearse" two of Wagner's works. In a conversation with Edward Said, Barenboim said that "Wagner, the person, is absolutely appalling, despicable, and, in a way, very difficult to put together with the music he wrote, which so often has exactly the opposite kind of feelings ... noble, generous, etc." He called Wagner's antisemitism obviously "monstrous", and feels it must be faced, but argues that "Wagner did not cause the Holocaust."

In 1990, Barenboim conducted the Berlin Philharmonic Orchestra in its first appearance in Israel, but he excluded Wagner's works. "Although Wagner died in 1883, he is not played [in Israel] because his music is too inextricably linked with Nazism, and so is too painful for those who suffered", Barenboim told a reporter. "Why play what hurts people?" Not long afterwards, it was announced that Barenboim would lead the Israel Philharmonic in two Wagner overtures, which took place on 27 December "before a carefully screened audience".

In 2000, the Israel Supreme Court upheld the right of the Rishon LeZion Orchestra to perform Wagner's Siegfried Idyll. At the Israel Festival in Jerusalem in July 2001, Barenboim had scheduled to perform the first act of Die Walküre with three singers, including tenor Plácido Domingo. However, strong protests by some Holocaust survivors, as well as the Israeli government, led the festival authorities to ask for an alternative program (The Israel Festival's Public Advisory board, which included some Holocaust survivors, had originally approved the program.). The controversy appeared to end in May, after the Israel Festival announced that a selection by Wagner would not be included at the 7 July concert. Barenboim agreed to substitute music by Schumann and Stravinsky.

However, at the end of the concert with the Berlin Staatskapelle, Barenboim announced that he would like to play Wagner as a second encore and invited those who objected to leave, saying: "Despite what the Israel Festival believes, there are people sitting in the audience for whom Wagner does not spark Nazi associations. I respect those for whom these associations are oppressive. It will be democratic to play a Wagner encore for those who wish to hear it. I am turning to you now and asking whether I can play Wagner." A half-hour debate ensued, with some audience members calling Barenboim a "fascist". In the end, a small number of attendees walked out and the overwhelming majority remained, applauding loudly after the performance of the Tristan und Isolde Prelude.

In September 2001, a public relations associate for the Chicago Symphony Orchestra, where Barenboim was the music director, revealed that season ticket-holders were about evenly divided about the wisdom of Barenboim's decision to play Wagner in Jerusalem.

Barenboim regarded the performance of Wagner at the 7 July concert as a political statement. He said he had decided to defy the ban on Wagner after having a news conference he held the previous week interrupted by the ringing of a mobile phone to the tune of Wagner's "Ride of the Valkyries". "I thought if it can be heard on the ring of a telephone, why can't it be played in a concert hall?" he said.

A Knesset committee subsequently called for Barenboim to be declared a persona non-grata in Israel until he apologized for conducting Wagner's music. The move was condemned by the musical director of the Israel Philharmonic Orchestra Zubin Mehta and members of Knesset. Prior to receiving the $100,000 Wolf Prize, awarded annually in Israel, Barenboim said: "If people were really hurt, of course I regret this, because I don't want to harm anyone."

In 2005, Barenboim gave the inaugural Edward Said Memorial Lecture at Columbia University, entitled "Wagner, Israel and Palestine". In the speech, according to the Financial Times, Barenboim "called on Israel to accept the Palestinian 'narrative even though they may not agree with it'", and said, "The state of Israel was supposed to provide the instrument for the end of anti-Semitism ... This inability to accept a new narrative has led to a new anti-Semitism that is very different from the European anti-Semitism of the 19th century." According to The New York Times, Barenboim said it was the "fear, this conviction of being yet again the victim, that does not allow the Israeli public to accept Wagner's anti-Semitism. ... It is the same cell in the collective brain that does not allow them to make progress in their understanding of the needs of the Palestinian people", and also said that suicide bombings in Israel "had to be seen in the context of the historical development at which we have arrived". The speech caused controversy; the Jewish Telegraphic Agency wrote that Barenboim had "compared Herzl's ideas to Wagner's; criticized Palestinian terrorist attacks but also justified them; and said Israeli actions contributed to the rise of international anti-Semitism".

In March 2007, Barenboim said: "The whole subject of Wagner in Israel has been politicized and is a symptom of a malaise that goes very deep in Israeli society ..."

In 2010, before conducting Wagner's Die Walküre for the gala premiere of La Scala's season in Milan, he said that the perception of Wagner was unjustly influenced by the fact that he was Hitler's favourite composer: "I think a bit of the problem with Wagner isn't what we all know in Israel, anti-Semitism, etc. ... It is how the Nazis and Hitler saw Wagner as his own prophet. ... This perception of Hitler colors for many people the perception of Wagner. ... We need one day to liberate Wagner of all this weight".

In a 2012 interview with Der Spiegel, Barenboim said, "It saddens me that official Israel so doggedly refuses to allow Wagner to be performed – as was the case, once again, at the University of Tel Aviv two weeks ago – because I see it as a symptom of a disease. The words I'm about to use are harsh, but I choose them deliberately: There is a politicization of the remembrance of the Holocaust in Israel, and that's terrible." He also argued that after the trial of Adolf Eichmann and the Six-Day War, "a misunderstanding also arose ... namely that the Holocaust, from which the Jews' ultimate claim to Israel was derived, and the Palestinian problem had something to do with each other."

He also said, that:

... since the Six-Day War, Israeli politicians have repeatedly established a connection between European anti-Semitism and the fact that the Palestinians don't accept the founding of the State of Israel. But that's absurd! The Palestinians weren't primarily anti-Semitic. They just didn't accept their expulsion. But European anti-Semitism goes much further back than to the partition of Palestine and the establishment of Israel in 1948.

In response to a question from the interviewer, he said he conducted Wagner with the West–Eastern Divan Orchestra because, "The musicians wanted it. I said: Sure, but we have to talk about it. It's a tricky decision." When the interviewer asked if the initiative came from Arab musicians in the orchestra, he replied, "On the contrary. It was the Israelis. The Israeli brass players."

Over the years, observers of the Wagner battle have weighed in on both sides of the issue.

== Political views ==
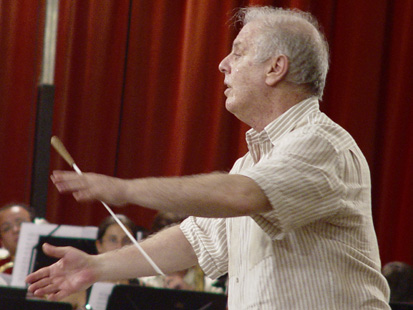
Daniel Barenboim leads a rehearsal of the West–Eastern Divan in Seville, Spain, 2005

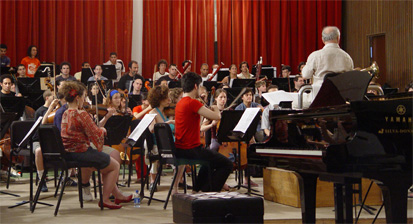
Rehearsal of the West–Eastern Divan under the lead of Daniel Barenboim, 2005

Barenboim is an outspoken critic of Israel's conservative governments and the Israeli occupation of the Palestinian territories. In an interview with the British music critic Norman Lebrecht in 2003, Barenboim accused Israel of behaving in a manner that was "morally abhorrent and strategically wrong" and "putting in danger the very existence of the state of Israel". In 1967, at the start of the Six-Day War, Barenboim and du Pré had performed for the Israeli troops on the front lines, as well as during the Yom Kippur War in 1973. During the Gulf War, he and an orchestra performed in Israel in gas masks.

Barenboim has argued publicly for a two-state solution for Israelis and Palestinians. In a November 2014 opinion piece in The Guardian, he wrote that the "ongoing security of the state of Israel ... is only possible in the long term if the future of the Palestinian people, too, is secured in its own sovereign state. If this does not happen, the wars and history of that region will be constantly repeated and the unbearable stalemate will continue."

=== West–Eastern Divan ===
In 1999, Barenboim and Palestinian-American intellectual Edward Said jointly founded the West–Eastern Divan Orchestra. This initiative brings together, every summer, a group of young classical musicians from Israel, Palestine and Arab countries to study, perform and to promote mutual reflection and understanding. Barenboim and Said jointly received the 2002 Prince of Asturias Awards for their work in "improving understanding between nations". Together they wrote the book Parallels and Paradoxes, based on a series of public discussions held at New York's Carnegie Hall.

In September 2005, presenting the book written with Said, Barenboim refused to be interviewed by uniformed Israel Defense Forces Radio reporter Dafna Arad, considering the wearing of the uniform insensitive for the occasion. In response, Israeli Education Minister Limor Livnat of the Likud party called him "a real Jew hater" and "a real anti-Semite".

After being invited for the fourth time to the Doha Festival for Music and Dialogue in Qatar with the West–Eastern Divan Orchestra in 2012, Barenboim's invitation was cancelled by the authorities because of "sensitivity to the developments in the Arab world". There had been a campaign against him in the Arab media, accusing him of "being a Zionist".

In July 2012, Barenboim and the orchestra played a pivotal role at the BBC Proms, performing a cycle of Beethoven's nine symphonies, with the Ninth timed to coincide with the opening of the London 2012 Olympic Games. In addition, he was an Olympic flag carrier at the opening ceremony of the Games.

=== Wolf Prize ===
In May 2004, Barenboim was awarded the Wolf Prize at a ceremony at the Israeli Knesset. Education Minister Livnat held up the nomination until Barenboim apologized for his performance of Wagner in Israel. Barenboim called Livnat's demand "politically motivated", adding "I don't see what I need to apologize about. If I ever hurt a person privately or in public, I am sorry, because I have no intention of hurting people ...", which was good enough for Livnat. The ceremony was boycotted by Knesset Speaker Reuven Rivlin, also a member of the Likud party. In his acceptance speech, Barenboim expressed his opinion on the political situation, referring to the Israeli Declaration of Independence in 1948:

I am asking today with deep sorrow: Can we, despite all our achievements, ignore the intolerable gap between what the Declaration of Independence promised and what was fulfilled, the gap between the idea and the realities of Israel? Does the condition of occupation and domination over another people fit the Declaration of Independence? Is there any sense in the independence of one at the expense of the fundamental rights of the other? Can the Jewish people whose history is a record of continued suffering and relentless persecution, allow themselves to be indifferent to the rights and suffering of a neighboring people? Can the State of Israel allow itself an unrealistic dream of an ideological end to the conflict instead of pursuing a pragmatic, humanitarian one based on social justice?

Israel's president Moshe Katsav, originally also of Likud, and Education Minister Livnat criticized Barenboim for his speech. Livnat accused him of attacking the State of Israel, to which Barenboim replied that he had not done so, but that he instead had cited the text of the Israeli Declaration of Independence.

=== Performing in the West Bank and Gaza Strip ===
Barenboim has performed several times in the West Bank: at Bir Zeit University in 1999 and several times in Ramallah.

In December 2007, Barenboim was scheduled to play a concert in Gaza. Barenboim commented: "A baroque music concert in a Roman Catholic church in Gaza – as we all know – has nothing to do with security and would bring so much joy to people who live there in great difficulty."

In January 2008, after performing in Ramallah, Barenboim accepted honorary Palestinian citizenship, becoming the first Jewish Israeli citizen to be offered the status. Barenboim said he hoped it would serve as a public gesture of peace. Some Israelis criticized Barenboim's decision to accept Palestinian citizenship. The parliamentary faction chairman of the Shas party demanded that Barenboim be stripped of his Israeli citizenship, but the Interior Minister told the media that "the matter is not even up for discussion".

In January 2009, Barenboim cancelled two concerts of the West–Eastern Divan Orchestra in Qatar and Cairo "due to the escalating violence in Gaza and the resulting concerns for the musicians' safety".

In May 2011, Barenboim conducted the "Orchestra for Gaza" composed of volunteers from the Berlin Philharmonic, the Berlin Staatskapelle, the Orchestra of La Scala in Milan, the Vienna Philharmonic and the Orchestre de Paris, at al-Mathaf Cultural House. The concert, held in Gaza City, was co-ordinated in secret with the United Nations. The orchestra flew from Berlin to Vienna and from there to El Arish on a plane chartered by Barenboim, entering the Gaza Strip at the Egyptian Rafah Border Crossing. The musicians were escorted by a convoy of United Nations vehicles. The concert, the first performance by an international classical ensemble in the Strip, was attended by an invited audience of several hundred schoolchildren and NGO workers, who greeted Barenboim with applause. The orchestra played Mozart's Eine kleine Nachtmusik and Symphony No. 40, also familiar to an Arab audience as the basis of one of the songs of the famous Arab singer Fairuz. In his speech, Barenboim said: "Everyone has to understand that the Palestinian cause is a just cause therefore it can be only given justice if it is achieved without violence. Violence can only weaken the righteousness of the Palestinian cause".

== Recognition ==
The minor planet 7163 Barenboim, discovered in 1984, is named after him.

=== Awards and titles ===
- Grand Cross of the Order of Merit of the Federal Republic of Germany, 2002
- Prince of Asturias Awards, 2002 (jointly with Edward Said)
- Toleranzpreis der Evangelischen Akademie Tutzing, 2002
- Wilhelm Furtwängler Prize, 2003 (with Staatskapelle Berlin)
- Buber-Rosenzweig-Medal, 2004
- Wolf Prize in Arts, 2004 (According to the documentary "Knowledge Is the Beginning", Barenboim donated all the proceeds to music education for Israeli and Palestinian youth)
- Foreign Honorary Member of the American Academy of Arts and Sciences, 2005
- Ernst von Siemens Music Prize, 2006
- Hessian Peace Prize, 2006
- Knight Grand Cross of the Order of Merit of the Italian Republic, 2007
- Commander of the Legion of Honour, 2007
- Goethe Medal, 2007
- Praemium Imperiale, 2007
- Nominated "Honorary Guide" by UFO religion Raëlian Movement, 2008
- International Service Award for the Global Defence of Human Rights, 2008
- Golden Doves for Peace awarded by IRIAD, 2008
- Royal Philharmonic Society Gold Medal, 2008
- Istanbul International Music Festival Lifetime Achievement Award, 2009
- In 2009, Konex Foundation from Argentina granted him the Diamond Konex Award for Classical Music as the most important musician in the last decade in his country.
- Léonie Sonning Music Prize, 2009
- Westphalian Peace Prize (Westfälischer Friedenspreis), in 2010, for his striving for dialog in the Near East
- Otto Hahn Peace Medal (Otto-Hahn-Friedensmedaille) of the United Nations Association of Germany (DGVN), Berlin-Brandenburg, for his efforts in promoting peace, humanity and international understanding, 2010
- Grand Officier of the Legion of Honour, 2011
- Edison Award for Lifetime Achievement 2011, the most prestigious music award of The Netherlands
- Honorary Knight Commander of the Order of the British Empire (KBE), 2011
- Dresden Peace Prize, 2011
- International Willy-Brandt Prize, 2011
- In 2012, he was voted into the Gramophone Hall of Fame.
- Honorary Member of the Berliner Philharmoniker
- Pour le Mérite for Sciences and Arts, 2015
- Elgar Medal, 2015
- Lifetime Achievement Gramophone Classical Music Awards 2022
- Honorary citizen of Berlin, 2023
- Grand Cross of the Legion of Honour, 2023
- Grand Cross of the Order of Civil Merit, 2025

=== Honorary degrees ===
- Doctor of Philosophy, Hebrew University of Jerusalem, 1996
- Honorary doctorate, Vrije Universiteit Brussel, 2003
- Doctor of Music, University of Oxford, 2007
- Doctor of Music, SOAS, University of London, 2008
- Doctor of Music, Royal Academy of Music, 2010
- Doctor of Philosophy, Weizmann Institute of Science, 2013
- University of Florence, 2020

=== Grammy Awards ===
Barenboim received seven Grammy Awards.

Grammy Award for Best Opera Recording:

- Christoph Classen (producer), Eberhard Sengpiel, Tobias Lehmann (engineers), Daniel Barenboim (conductor), Jane Eaglen, Thomas Hampson, Waltraud Meier, René Pape, Peter Seiffert, the Chor der Deutschen Staatsoper Berlin & the Staatskapelle Berlin for Wagner: Tannhäuser (2003)

Grammy Award for Best Chamber Music Performance:

- Daniel Barenboim, Dale Clevenger, Larry Combs, Daniele Damiano, and Hansjörg Schellenberger for Beethoven/Mozart: Quintets (1995)
- Daniel Barenboim & Itzhak Perlman for Brahms: The Three Violin Sonatas (1991)

Grammy Award for Best Orchestral Performance:

- Daniel Barenboim (conductor) & the Chicago Symphony Orchestra for Corigliano: Symphony No. 1 (1992)

Grammy Award for Best Instrumental Soloist(s) Performance (with orchestra):

- Martin Fouqué (producer), Eberhard Sengpiel (engineer), Daniel Barenboim (conductor / piano), Dale Clevenger, Larry Combs, Alex Klein, David McGill & the Chicago Symphony Orchestra for Richard Strauss Wind Concertos (Horn Concerto; Oboe Concerto, etc.) (2002)
- Daniel Barenboim (conductor), Itzhak Perlman & the Chicago Symphony Orchestra for Elgar: Violin Concerto in B Minor (1983)
- Daniel Barenboim (conductor), Arthur Rubinstein & the London Philharmonic Orchestra for Beethoven: The Five Piano Concertos (1977) (also awarded Grammy Award for Best Classical Album)

== Straight-strung piano ==
In 2017, Barenboim unveiled a piano that has straight-strung bass strings, as opposed to the crossed-stringed modern instrument. He was inspired by Liszt's Érard piano, which has straight strings. Barenboim appreciates the clarity of tone and a greater control over the tonal quality (or color) his new instrument gives. This piano was developed with the help of Chris Maene at Maene Piano, who also built it. In 2019, Barenboim used this instrument to perform with the Berlin Philharmonic Orchestra.

Cultural offices
Preceded by Riccardo Muti	Music Director, La Scala, Milan; 2007–2014	Succeeded by Riccardo Chailly
