= Subharmonic synthesizer =

A subharmonic synthesizer or subharmonic saturator is a device or system that generates subharmonics of an input signal. The n^{th} subharmonic of a signal of fundamental frequency F is a signal with frequency F/n. This differs from ordinary harmonics, where the n^{th} harmonic of fundamental frequency F is a signal of frequency nF.

Subharmonic synthesizers can be used in professional audio applications as bass enhancement devices during the playback of recorded music. Other uses for subharmonic synthesizers include the application in bandwidth extension. A subharmonic synthesizer can be used to extend low frequency response due to bandwidth limitations of telephone systems.

Subharmonic synthesizers are used extensively in dance clubs in certain genres of music such as disco and house music. They are often implemented to enhance the lower frequencies, in an attempt to gain a "heavier" or more vibrant sound. Various harmonics can be amplified or modulated, although it is most common to boost the fundamental frequency's lower octave. The kick drum can benefit greatly from this type of processing. A subharmonic synthesizer (or "synth" as it is known in the industry) creates a bigger presence and can give the music that much sought-after "punch".

== History ==
During the disco era, sound engineers aimed to create a more powerful, deep bass sound in dance clubs and nightclubs. A key approach used by engineers to get heavier, deeper bass sound was to add huge subwoofer cabinets to reproduce the sub-bass frequencies. The Paradise Garage discotheque in New York City, which operated from 1977 to 1987, had "custom designed 'sub-bass' speakers" developed by Alex Rosner's disciple, sound engineer Richard ("Dick") Long that were called "Levan Horns" (in honor of resident DJ Larry Levan). By the end of the 1970s, subwoofers were used in dance venue sound systems to enable the playing of "[b]ass-heavy dance music" that we "do not 'hear' with our ears but with our entire body".

One challenge with getting deep sub-bass was that in the era of vinyl records, "to get as much music as possible on a record, recording engineers must limit the depth and excursion of record grooves. So in the recording process, the lower frequencies are often deliberately reduced or cut off altogether." To overcome the lack of sub-bass frequencies on 1970s disco records (sub-bass frequencies below 60 Hz were removed during mastering), Long added a DBX 100 "Boom Box" subharmonic synthesizer into his system. The dbx 100 Sub Harmonic Synthesizer "recreates this lost portion of the audio spectrum by seizing information in the 50-100 Hz range, creating a signal one octave lower (25-50 Hz) and mixing this new signal back into the program." The dbx 120A Subharmonic Synthesizer with Modeled Waveform Synthesis provides two separate bands of bass synthesis and a subwoofer output jack.

== See also ==
- Subharchord
- Exciter (effect)
