= Larry Combs =

- Born: December 31, 1939 (age 86); South Charleston, West Virginia
- Origin: New Orleans Symphony Orchestra
- Genres: Classical, Jazz
- Occupation: Musician
- Instrument: Clarinet

Larry Combs (born December 31, 1939) is an American clarinetist and educator.

== Early life and education ==
Combs was born in South Charleston, West Virginia. He received a bachelor of music degree with distinction as well as the Performer's Certificate in 1961 from the Eastman School of Music where he studied with Stanley Hasty. He later studied with Leon Russianoff in New York from 1962-1965.

== Career ==
Combs played clarinet with the New Orleans Symphony Orchestra, the Montreal Symphony Orchestra, and the Santa Fe Opera before joining the Chicago Symphony Orchestra in 1974. He was appointed principal clarinet of the CSO by Sir Georg Solti in 1978. He has appeared as a soloist with the orchestra on many occasions. He retired from the CSO following the 2007–2008 season to spend more time teaching clarinet students at DePaul University. He retired from DePaul in 2018.

He is also a founding member of the Chicago Chamber Musicians in 1986. He has performed the Brahms Clarinet Trio with Daniel Barenboim and cellist Yo-Yo Ma, and has appeared at the Ravinia Festival with its music director, Christoph Eschenbach. Other appearances have been with The Chamber Music Society of Lincoln Center and the Smithsonian Chamber Players. + He is also a founding member of the Chicago Chamber Musicians. Combs is also a jazz aficionado. His Combs-Novak Sextet is one of the headliners at the 1999 Chicago Jazz Festival; he cut an album with jazz clarinetist Eddie Daniels, called "Crossing the Line"; and the Chicago Reader's Ted Shen wrote that he is "a Benny Goodman-like chameleon who can execute breathtaking arabesques and add a touch of eloquence to the plainest phrase." He was a clinician for the G. Leblanc Company, which made the Opus II clarinets he helped to design, and the Larry Combs models of clarinet mouthpieces.

== Personal life ==
Combs is married to Gail Williams, a horn professor at Northwestern University and retired associate principal horn of the Chicago Symphony.

== Awards and recognition ==
Grammy Award for Best Chamber Music Performance

- 1995: Beethoven and Mozart Quintets, Chicago-Berlin Chamber Ensemble with Daniel Barenboim, Dale Clevenger, Larry Combs, Daniele Damiano, and Hansjorg Schellenberger (Erato Records)

Grammy Award for Best Instrumental Soloist(s) Performance (with orchestra)

- 2002: Richard Strauss's Duet-Concertino for Clarinet and Bassoon with David McGill; Chicago Symphony Orchestra; Daniel Barenboim, conductor (Teldec)

== Discography ==
- "The Jazz Brothers", Riverside, 1960 (alto sax in the Mangione Brothers Sextet)
- "Crossing the Line" with Eddie Daniels
- "Mozart: Music for Bassett Horns", CBS Masterworks, 1986 (Grammy nominated album)
- "Chicago Chamber Musicians at 15"
- Chicago Chamber Musicians
- "Larry Combs, Clarinet", Music of Rozsa, Rochberg, and Schuller, 2005
- "Orchestral Excerpts for Clarinet", 1994
- "Brahms, Scriabin, Prokofieff for Clarinet", 1995
- "The American Clarinet", Music of Bernstein, Copland, Gershwin, and Gould, 1995
