= Verband Deutscher Tonmeister =

Verband Deutscher Tonmeister e.V.
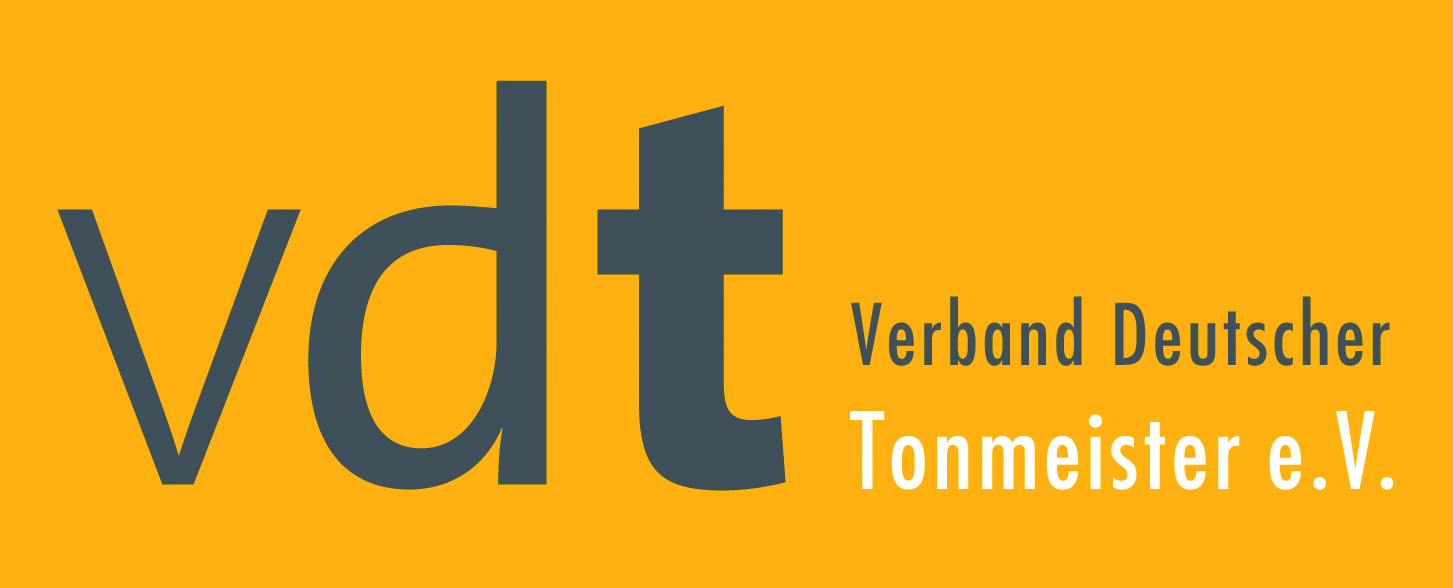
- The logo of the German Tonmeisters' Association (Verband Deutscher Tonmeister)
- Abbreviation: VDT
- Formation: 1950; 76 years ago (as Deutsche Filmtonmeister-Vereinigung)
- Type: Professional association
- Legal status: Active
- Headquarters: Cologne, Germany
- Location: Munich (Founding location)
- Members: c. 2,100 (2026)
- President: Ulrike Anderson
- Vice President: Daniela Rieger
- Key people: Stefani Renner (Managing Director)
- Main organ: General Meeting
- Subsidiaries: Bildungswerk des VDT GmbH
- Affiliations: Audio Engineering Society (Thematic relation)
- Website: tonmeister.org

The Verband Deutscher Tonmeister e.V. (VDT) is a registered association for audio industry professionals. The VDT has evolved from the Deutsche Filmtonmeister-Vereinigung (which focused on film sound professionals), that was founded in Munich in 1950.

There are currently more than 1900 members in the VDT that are either freelancers or employed in various institutions; e.g. in the film business, radio broadcasting, television, recording studios, record labels, theaters and performance venues, the audio equipment producing industry, research and development, multimedia education and other audio related areas of occupation. Students preparing for a job in the audio industry are also members of the VDT, making up roughly 10%.

Even though the designation of Tonmeister is a fixed part of the name of the association its members carry many other job titles like audio engineer, sound director, music director, sound designer, producer, record producer and music supervisor. The occupational title Tonmeister, although created in the 1930s, is not protected in Germany and does not describe a clearly defined occupation. Thematically the goals and activities of the VDT are related to those of the Audio Engineering Society (AES), even if there is no formal connection.

The biennial Tonmeistertagung (VDT International convention) combines an international scientific conference and workshop program with a trade fair, focusing on applied research and technical excellence. It has been in existence since 1949. Similarly the International Tonmeister Symposium, dedicated to one thematic complex, is analogous to the AES-conferences. The Tonmeister Academy as initiated by the VDT offers educational classes and advanced training sessions.

The VDT award Golden Bobby is awarded in seven categories for outstanding performance in sound recording and mixing. Since 2002 the VDT also bestows a medal of honour on members who have rendered outstanding services to the profession of sound engineers and the audio industry. Prominent recipients are Peter K. Burkowitz (developer of the REDD mixing console at EMI's Abbey Road Studios; writer of the technical part of Recording the Beatles), David Griesinger (of Lexicon) and Eberhard Sengpiel.
