= Tonmeister =

Recording industry professional

Tonmeister is a job description in the music and recording industries that describes a so-called "sound master" (a literal translation of the German Tonmeister): a person who creates recordings or broadcasts of music who is also both musically trained (in classical and non-classical genres) and has theoretical and practical knowledge.

The word tonmeister was trademarked in 1996 by the University of Surrey, United Kingdom. Also within the UK, the SAE Institute registered the term SAE Tonmeister. The title has been abbreviated to tonmeister in their registrations in several other countries, not including Germany, Switzerland or Austria. Members of the VDT may call themselves Tonmeister VDT.

== Origins ==
The concept of a tonmeister dates back to 1946, when Arnold Schoenberg wrote a letter to the Chancellor of the University of Chicago suggesting a course to train "soundmen". Schoenberg wrote, "soundmen will be trained in music, acoustics, physics, mechanics and related fields to a degree enabling them to control and improve the sonority of recordings, radio broadcasts and sound films". It was also in this year that the University of Music Detmold in Germany started the first Tonmeister course.
