= Ernst Levy =

Swiss composer and pianist (1895-1981)

Ernst Levy (18 November 1895 – 19 April 1981) was a Swiss musicologist, composer, pianist and conductor.

== Life ==
Born in Basel, Switzerland, Levy studied with Hans Huber, Egon Petri and Raoul Pugno.

David Dubal describes him as an "unusual and powerful pianist" who made "grandly conceived" recordings of the late Beethoven sonatas and captured "the very essence of the Faustian Liszt". His work as a musicologist and teacher brought him to the United States, where he taught at colleges including the Massachusetts Institute of Technology, the University of Chicago and the New England Conservatory; he also became a United States citizen. His students included the composers Anna Renfer Hazel Ghazarian Skaggs. In 1966, he retired from academia and returned to his native Switzerland where he spent the remainder of his life. He died in Morges.

Levy's book A Theory of Harmony was published in 1985 and, among other modern compositional concepts, describes the composer's concept of harmonic "undertones".

Levy's son was composer and cellist Frank Ezra Levy (1930–2017).

== Selected compositions ==
Orchestral

- Symphony No. 2 in D major (1922)
- Symphony No. 3 (1922)
- Symphony No. 7 (1937)
- Symphony No. 8 (1937)
- Symphony No. 10 "France" (1944)
- Symphony No. 11 (1949)
- Symphony No. 12 (1951)
- Symphony No. 13 (1955)
- Third Suite for orchestra (1957)
- Fourth Suite for orchestra (1959)
- Symphony No. 14 (1962)
- Symphony No. 15 (1968)

Concertante

- Concerto for cello and orchestra (1947)

Chamber music

- String Quartet No. 1 (1919)
- Sonata No. 1 for violin and piano (1932)
- Divertimento for clarinet (or oboe) and piano (1952)
- Theme and Transformations for clarinet and piano (1952)
- String Trio No. 1 (1953)
- Sonata for cello and piano (1953)
- Sonata for horn and Piano (1953)
- Fifteen Little Pieces for cello solo (1955)
- Piano Quartet (1956)
- Suite for viola or cello solo (1956)
- Suite for violin solo (1960)
- String Trio No. 2 (1960)
- Sonata No. 2 for violin and piano (1961)
- Sonata No. 3 for violin and piano (1963)
- Sonatina No. 1 for violin and piano (1962)
- Sonatina No. 2 for violin and piano (1962)
- Suite for 2 violas (1963)
- Trio for clarinet, cello and piano (1963)
- Sonata for three violin parts (1965)
- String Trio No. 3 (1966)
- Trio for clarinet, viola and piano (1968)
- Trio No. 2 for clarinet, violin and piano (1970)
- Suite No. 2 for viola solo (1971)
- Soliloquy for clarinet solo (1971)
- Concerto sur "Auprès de ma blonde" for trumpet and piano (1975)
- Threnodie for viola, cello and organ (1975)
- Sonata for 2 violins and piano (1977)
- Intermezzo idilliaco for clarinet and piano (1978)
- String Trio No. 4 (1978)
- String Quartet No. 4 (1978)
- String Quartet No. 5 (1978)
- Sonata for viola and piano (1979)
- Trio for violin, cello and piano (1979)
- Sonata Accompagnata for bassoon and piano or orchestra (1980)

Keyboard

- Fantaisie symphonique for harpsichord (1939)
- Ricercar for harpsichord (1960)
- Meditation on a Hebrew Raga for organ (1961)
- Study on the Whole-Tone Scales for piano (1971)
- Piano Sonata No. 1 (1973)
- Piano Sonata No. 2 (1974)
- Piano Sonata No. 3 (1975)
- Piano Sonata No. 4 (1976)
- Piano Sonata No. 5 (1977)
- Piano Sonata No. 6 (1979)
- Piano Sonata No. 7 (1981)
- Hommage romantique for piano (1977)
- Fantaisie dialoguée for organ and piano (1980)

Vocal

- Gaudeamus, Cantata for mixed chorus, wind orchestra and timpani (1964)
- Li T'ai Po's Answer for tenor, string orchestra and flute (1979)
- Eins und Alles for baritone and string orchestra (1980); words by Johann Wolfgang von Goethe
- Levy, Ernst (1946). Four folk songs from Switzerland: for 4 mixed voices, SATB. New York: Music Press. OCLC 78196587.
- Levy, Ernst (1952). Divertimento for clarinet (or oboe) and piano. New York: Seesaw Music Corp. OCLC 869234.
- Levy, Ernst (1953). Sonata, for violoncello & piano. New York: Seesaw Music Corp. OCLC 222539336.
- Levy, Ernst (1954). 7 piano pieces. New York: Boosey & Hawkes. OCLC 83544484.
- Levy, Ernst; Paul Boepple (1957). Hear, ye children: Proverbs 4:1,7,8 (part-songs). Bennington, VT: Bennington College. OCLC 77291468.
- Levy, Ernst (1968). Trio, for clarinet, viola, and piano. New York: Seesaw Music Corp. OCLC 221789930.
- Levy, Ernst (1969). Sonata for horn and piano. New York: Seesaw Music Corp. OCLC 869439.

== Academic works ==
- Levy, Ernst (1956). On the proportions of the south tower of Chartres Cathedral. Cambridge, MA: Dept. of Humanities, Massachusetts Institute of Technology. OCLC 11508947.
- Levy, Ernst; Siegmund Levarie (1968). Tone, a Study in Musical Acoustics. Kent, OH: Kent State University Press. OCLC 60510.
- Levy, Ernst; Siegmund Levarie (1983). Musical Morphology: A Discourse and a Dictionary (illustrated ed.). Kent, OH: Kent State University Press. ISBN 0-87338-286-2.
- Levy, Ernst; Siegmund Levarie (1985). A Theory of Harmony. Albany, NY: State University of New York Press. ISBN 0-87395-993-0.
