= Megan Watts Hughes =

Welsh singer and scientist (1842–1907)

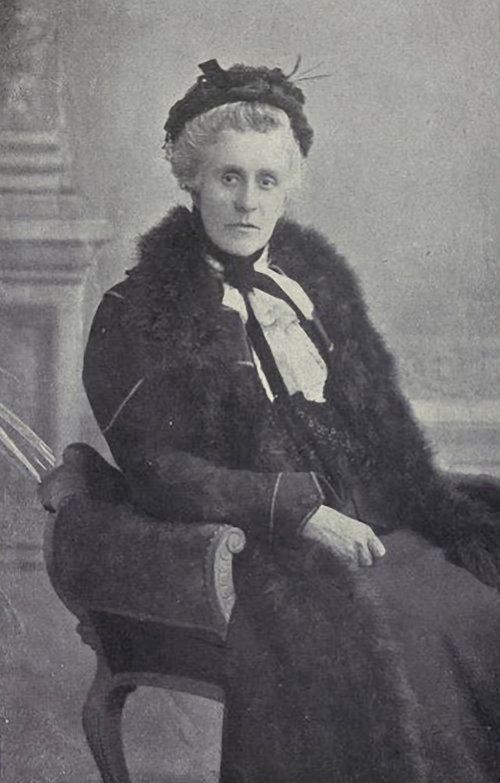
- Occupations: singer, songwriter, scientist and philanthropist
- Known for: voice-figures

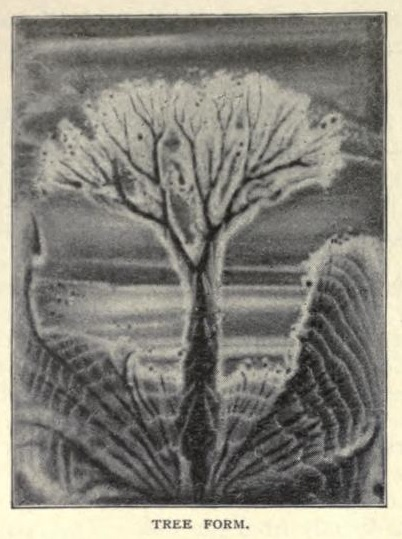
"Tree Form" - Hughes created this picture using an eidophone which allowed the resonance of sound to be visualised.

Megan [Margaret] Watts Hughes (12 February 1842 – 29 October 1907) was a Welsh singer, songwriter, scientist and philanthropist. Her name appears as Margaret, the equivalent of the Welsh name Megan, in several publications. She was recognised by certain sources as the first to experiment with and observe the phenomenon of visualizing sound, using a device she invented called an "eidophone". The device or instrument produced geometric patterns from the resonance of her voice. As a result, she referred to the images from it as "Voice-Figures." These experiments led to her 1904 book The Eidophone; Voice Figures: Geometrical and Natural Forms Produced by Vibrations of the Human Voice. She demonstrated the instrument for the Royal Society. She has been considered as a pioneer of sound art.

== Early life and musical career ==
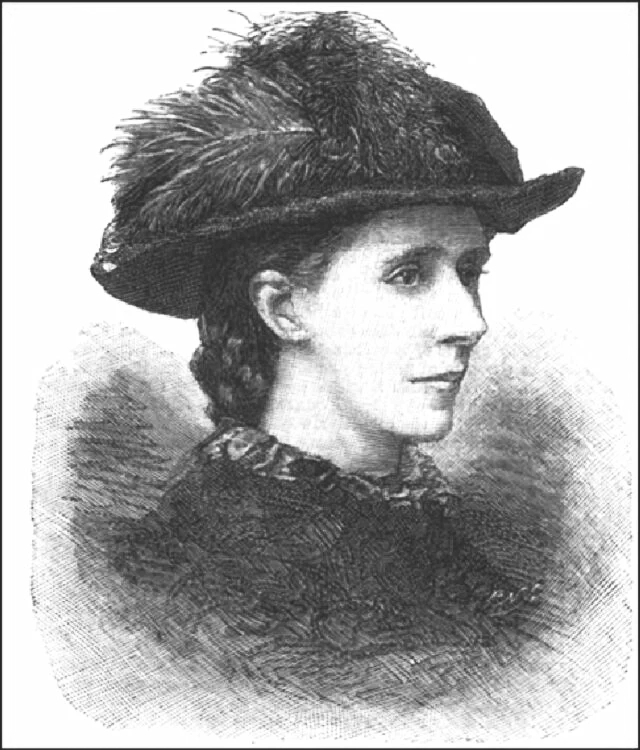
Hughes around 1890

Megan Watts was born in Dowlais, Glamorgan[shire], a historic county in southern Wales, to parents who had relocated from Pembrokeshire. Her father supervised the local cemetery. Following early success as a singer on the South Wales concert circuit, she obtained singing lessons from two leading Cardiff musicians, and in 1864 began studies at the Royal Academy of Music in London, where her teachers included Manuel García. However, she was forced to abandon her studies by ill-health. After marrying Hugh Lloyd Hughes in 1871, she became known as Mrs Watts Hughes and continued her musical career under that name. A deeply religious woman, she thought of the Bethania Church (Note: The Bethania Church established Welsh Independent Bethania Chapels across South Wales) as her spiritual home. At Mountford House in Barnsbury Square, Islington, she founded a "Home for Little Boys".

In a newspaper article of 1898, composer Joseph Parry referred to Megan Watts Hughes as being one of "our greatest vocalists". She had accompanied Parry on a "musical tour" of North Wales after leaving the Royal Academy of Music, and once appeared with Jenny Lind, one of the greatest sopranos of the day (who had also been trained by García). Lind is supposed to have said of her: "I have never met anyone so related to me in the art of music. Two sisters only have I in the art-Madame Schumann and Mrs. Megan Watts-Hughes." Mrs Watts Hughes wrote the hymn-tune "Wilton Square" and a number of other songs.

== "Voice-figures" ==
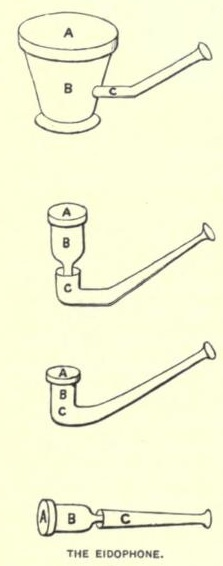
Diagram of Hughes' Eidophones. The "A" indicates the membrane on which the powder patterns are produced.

In 1885, while exercising her voice, she accidentally discovered what she called "voice-figures" or "voice-flowers", patterns created by the natural phenomenon of standing-wave resonance. She described the process which began with sand and/or lycopodium powder and later "flooding the disk of the eidophone with a thin layer of liquid, e.g., water or milk." Vibrations registered as patterns on the disc of the eidophone. She described the patterns as "beautiful crispations" which would only appear if the pitches sung were not too forced. She experimented with and found that coloured glycerine produced intricate flower-like patterns in the liquid.

Her scientific observations were first published in an 1891 Century Magazine article under the name Margaret Watts Hughes. She wrote that she had already presented her findings at The Musical Association, The Royal Institution, and the Royal Society in London, which was considered unusual for a woman in that period. Using her own photography and diagrams (pictured on the right), the article described her process and her invention in detail:

In 1885, while seeking means to indicate readily the intensities of vocal sounds, I first met with these [voice] figures, and, owing to their variety both in form and production, they have since absorbed much of my attention. The apparatus I have employed I call the eidophone. This is very simple. It consists merely of an elastic membrane, such as thoroughly flexible soft sheet-rubber, tightly stretched over the mouth of a receiver of any form, into which receiver the voice is introduced by a wide-mouthed tube of convenient shape. In some cases the receiver may be dispensed with, and the membrane be stretched across the open end of the tube itself.

This process would later be linked to the independent invention of research begun by Ernst Chladni, who used powder rather than liquid to facilitate the visual patterns. Watts Hughes' work was not only demonstrated at a scientific meeting of the Royal Society, her scientific paper in 1891 led her to publish a 47-page book that extensively detailed how she made sound visible. The book was entitled The Eidophone Voice Figures: Geometrical and Natural Forms Produced by Vibrations of the Human Voice, published in 1904. Her work along with Ernst Chladni became progenitors of a field called cymatics forwarded by Swiss scientist Hans Jenny and later studied by scientists at MIT.

British biophysicist Jill Purce investigated the effects of vibration on particles and water, following up on the findings of Chaldni and Watts Hughes.
