= Lauterwasser =

Lauterwasser is a German surname. Notable people with the surname include:

- Alexander Lauterwasser (born 1951), German researcher and photographer
- Jack Lauterwasser (1904–2003), English cyclist
- Siegfried Lauterwasser (1913–2000), German photographer
