= Cymatics =

Creation of visible patterns on a vibrated plate

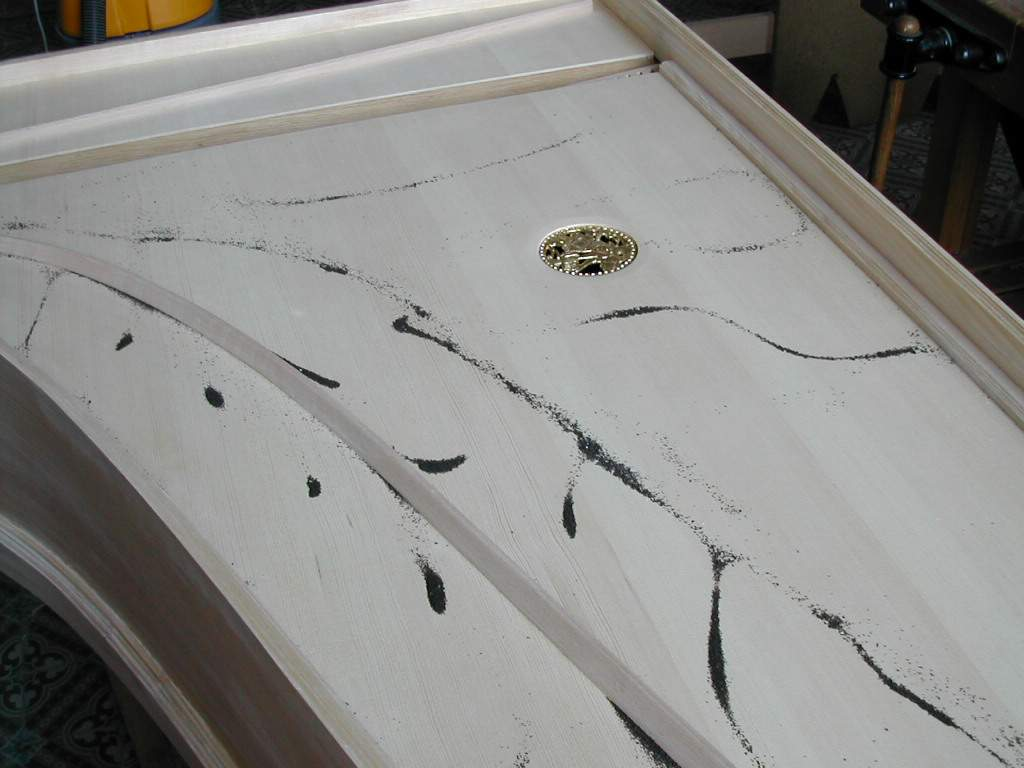
Resonance made visible with black seeds on a harpsichord soundboard

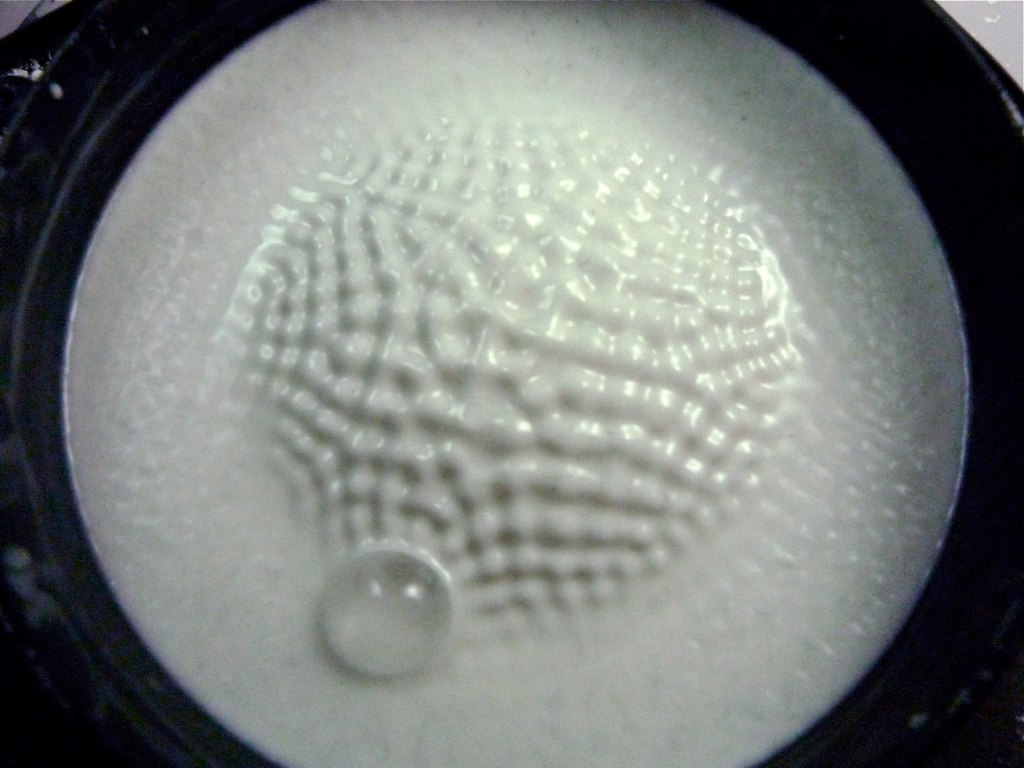
Cornstarch and water solution under the influence of sine wave vibration

A demonstration of sand forming cymatic patterns on a metal plate.

Cymatics (from Ancient Greek: κῦμα, romanized: kŷma, lit. 'wave') is a subset of modal vibrational phenomena. The term was coined by Swiss physician Hans Jenny (1904–1972). Typically the surface of a plate, diaphragm, or membrane is vibrated, and regions of maximum and minimum displacement are made visible in a thin coating of particles, paste, or liquid. Different patterns emerge in the excitatory medium depending on the geometry of the plate and the driving frequency.

The apparatus employed can be simple, such as the Chinese spouting bowl, in which copper handles are rubbed and cause the copper bottom elements to vibrate. Other examples include the Chladni plate and the so-called cymascope.

== History ==
On July 8, 1680, Robert Hooke was able to see the nodal patterns associated with the modes of vibration of glass plates. Hooke ran a bow along the edge of a glass plate covered with flour, and saw the nodal patterns emerge.

The German musician and physicist Ernst Chladni noticed in the eighteenth century that the modes of vibration of a membrane or a plate can be observed by sprinkling the vibrating surface with a fine dust (e.g., lycopodium powder, flour or fine sand). The powder moves due to the vibration and accumulates progressively in points of the surface corresponding to the sound vibration. The points form a pattern of lines, known as "nodal lines of the vibration mode". The normal modes of vibration, and the pattern of nodal lines associated with each of these, are completely determined, for a surface with homogeneous mechanical characteristics, from the geometric shape of the surface and by the way in which the surface is constrained.

Experiments of this kind, similar to those carried out earlier by Galileo Galilei around 1630 and by Robert Hooke in 1680, were later perfected by Chladni, who introduced them systematically in 1787 in his book Entdeckungen über die Theorie des Klanges (Discoveries on the theory of sound). This provided an important contribution to the understanding of acoustic phenomena and the functioning of musical instruments. The figures thus obtained (with the aid of a violin bow that rubbed perpendicularly along the edge of smooth plates covered with fine sand) are still designated by the name of "Chladni figures".

Michael Faraday discovered that liquids in a bowl produce regular patterns when the bowl is vibrated, so-called Faraday waves.

== Work of Hans Jenny ==
In 1967 Hans Jenny, a student of the anthroposophist Rudolf Steiner, published the first of two volumes in German entitled Kymatic; the second was published posthumously in 1972. He showed the evolution of harmonic images by subjecting inert substances to oscillating sound waves. His substantial body of work, based on rigorous scientific methodology, developed Chladni's experiments, highlighting intricate, organic, harmonic images that reflected many universal patterns found throughout nature and especially living organisms. Jenny spread powders, pastes, and liquids on a metal plate connected to an oscillator which could produce a broad spectrum of frequencies. The substances were organized into different structures characterized by geometric shapes typical of the frequency of the vibration emitted by the oscillator. According to Jenny, these structures, reminiscent of the mandala and other forms recurring in nature, would be a manifestation of an invisible force field of the vibrational energy that generated it. He was particularly impressed by an observation that imposing a vocalization in ancient Sanskrit of Om (regarded by Hindus and Buddhists as the sound of creation) the lycopodium powder formed a circle with a centre point, one of the ways in which Om had been represented.

In fact, for a plate of circular shape, resting in the centre (or the border, or at least in a set of points with central symmetry), the nodal vibration modes all have central symmetry, so the observation of Jenny is entirely consistent with well known mathematical properties. From the physical-mathematical standpoint, the form of the nodal patterns is predetermined by the shape of the body set in vibration or, in the case of acoustic waves in a gas, the shape of the cavity in which the gas is contained. The sound wave, therefore, does not influence at all the shape of the vibrating body or the shape of the nodal patterns. The only thing that changes due to the vibration is the arrangement of the sand. The image formed by the sand, in turn, is influenced by the frequency spectrum of the vibration only because each vibration mode is characterized by a specific frequency. Therefore, the spectrum of the signal that excites the vibration determines which patterns are actually nodally displayed. The physical phenomena involved in the formation of Chladni figures are best explained by classical physics.

== Influences on art and music ==
Devices for displaying nodal images have influenced visual arts and contemporary music. Artist Björk created projections of cymatics patterns by using bass frequencies on tour for her album Biophilia.

Hans Jenny's book on Chladni figures influenced Alvin Lucier and helped lead to Lucier's composition Queen of the South. Jenny's work was also followed up by Center for Advanced Visual Studies (CAVS) founder György Kepes at MIT. His work in this area included an acoustically vibrated piece of sheet metal in which small holes had been drilled in a grid. Small flames of gas burned through these holes and thermodynamic patterns were made visible by this setup.

In the mid-1980s, visual artist Ron Rocco, who also developed his work at CAVS, employed mirrors mounted to tiny servo motors, driven by the audio signal of a synthesizer and amplified by a tube amp to reflect the beam of a laser. This created light patterns which corresponded to the audio's frequency and amplitude. Using this beam to generate video feedback and computers to process the feedback signal, Rocco created his "Andro-media" series of installations. Rocco later formed a collaboration with musician David Hykes, who practiced a form of Mongolian overtone chanting with The Harmonic Choir, to generate cymatic images from a pool of liquid mercury, which functioned as a liquid mirror to modulate the beam of a Helium-Neon laser from the sound thus generated. Photographs of this work can be found in the Ars Electronica catalog of 1987.

Contemporary German photographer and philosopher Alexander Lauterwasser has brought cymatics into the 21st century using finely crafted crystal oscillators to resonate steel plates covered with fine sand and to vibrate small samples of water in Petri dishes. His first book, Water Sound Images, translated into English in 2006, features imagery of light reflecting off the surface of water set into motion by sound sources ranging from pure sine waves to music by Beethoven, Karlheinz Stockhausen, electroacoustic group Kymatik (who often record in ambisonic surround sound) and overtone singing. The resulting photographs of standing wave patterns are striking. Lauterwasser's book focused on creating detailed visual analogues of natural patterns ranging from the distribution of spots on a leopard to the geometric patterns found in plants and flowers, to the shapes of jellyfish and the intricate patterns found on the shell of a tortoise.

Composer Stuart Mitchell and his father T.J. Mitchell claimed that Rosslyn Chapel's carvings supposedly contain references to cymatics patterns. In 2005 they created a work called The Rosslyn Motet realised by attempting to match various Chladni patterns to 13 geometric symbols carved onto the faces of cubes emanating from 14 arches.

The musical group The Glitch Mob used cymatics to produce the music video "Becoming Harmonious (ft. Metal Mother)".

Influenced by yantra diagrams and cymatics, artist and fashion designer Mandali Mendrilla created a sculpture dress called "Kamadhenu" (Wish Tree Dress III) the pattern of which is based on a Yantra diagram depicting goddess Kamadhenu.

Aphex Twin suggests learning more about cymatics in reference to 'master tuning of 440 Hz' in a conversation with synth-maker Tatsuya Takahashi.

Since 2010, the art collective Analema Group creates participatory performances in which cymatic patterns are produced digitally in real-time by the audience.

In 2014 musician Nigel Stanford produced "Cymatics", an instrumental and music video designed to demonstrate the visual aspects of cymatics.

In 2016 songwriter and former Arizona State Quarterback Samson Szakacsy brought a cymatics device he called "the Drawing Machine" on tour and had each set draw live to portray how music looks.

Contemporary American painter Jimmy O'Neal created his own cymascope, which he has used to produce various works of public art. One such painting is 511.95 Hz of wine, a large-scale mural based on the pattern created when tracing a finger around the rim of a nearly-empty wine glass.

In 2020 an official medal was issued by the Royal Dutch Mint to mark the 65th anniversary of the Eurovision Song Contest hosted by the city of Rotterdam. A 3D scanner was able to capture the cymatics shapes of a vibrating dish filled with water from the Maas river. To create the coin, all the historical winning songs from previous contests were mixed together and emitted through a speaker (video).

The logo and theme art for Eurovision 2022 is based on cymatics.

The main title sequence for The Lord of the Rings: The Rings of Power is inspired by cymatics.

== Influences in engineering ==
Inspired by periodic and symmetrical patterns at the air-liquid interface created by sound vibration, P. Chen and coworkers developed a method to engineer diverse structures from microscale materials using liquid-based templates. This liquid-based template can be dynamically reconfigured by tuning vibration frequency and acceleration.

== See also ==
- Mechanical resonance
- Megan Watts Hughes, inventor of the "eidophone"
- Music visualization
- Rayleigh's quotient in vibrations analysis
- Strobe light
- Vibration of plates
- Visual music
