= Jimmy O'Neal =

American painter

Jimmy O'Neal (born 1967) is an American painter known for large-scale installations of abstract reflective paintings. His work is often experimental, interactive, and inclusive of other media, and is sometimes derived from technological innovations such as an EEG machine and a cymascope. In 1995, he collaborated with fellow students at Savannah College of Art and Design (SCAD) to create the world's largest painting. The painting was the size of two football fields, and was included in the Guinness Book of World Records with credit to the group under the name "Southern Arts Revival."

O'Neal's work includes public and private commissions, museum exhibitions, and numerous group and solo exhibitions at galleries throughout the United States. Born in Atlanta, Georgia in 1967, O'Neal earned his Bachelor of Fine Arts (BFA) in Illustration and his Master of Fine Arts (MFA) in Painting, both at Savannah College of Art and Design.

== Work ==
O'Neal is a classically-trained painter whose work is often highly experimental, incorporating his interest in science and in creating interactive experiences for the viewer.

=== Mirrored paint ===
Much of O'Neal's body of work utilizes a pigmentless, "mirrored" paint, which O'Neal invented himself after discovering that no such paint was commercially available. He applies the paint to a sanded down mirror, and the viscosity of the paint formula creates textured surfaces that reflect anything in front of them with varying degrees of clarity. [5] The viewers see themselves in the painting and temporarily become a part of the image. The reflections change "depending on who's standing there and how the light is changing", according to O'Neal. "It's always a different piece, every minute."

=== EEG painting machine ===
O'Neal created a "painting machine" by connecting an electroencephalogram (EEG) device that would read his brain activity and translate the electrical impulses to a dual axis paint brush. In 2003, he incorporated it into a work for "Painting4", an exhibition at the Rose Art Museum at Brandeis University featuring O'Neal, Ingrid Calame, Katharina Grosse, and Michael Lin.

O'Neal took images of all the paintings he was bringing to the exhibition and made a slide show video, which he watched on a continual loop while wearing the EEG headgear. The painting machine then created a single painting from his response to viewing the images, in the form of electrical frequencies. This painting was then mounted on a boat and floated down a portion of the French Broad River in Marshall, North Carolina, where the mirrored paint would catch reflections of the landscape along the river bank. A video of the floating painting experiment was included in the show, as well as the boat itself.

=== Painting with cymatics ===
Several of O'Neal's public works were created with the use of a self-built cymascope, an instrument that captures standing-wave patterns in water created by the vibrational frequency of specific sounds. O'Neal photographed the patterns created by the cymascope and then turned them into large-scale paintings. One such work is "Reactants", a permanent installation in the lobby of the Hanesbrands Theatre in the Milton Rhodes Art Center in Winston-Salem, NC. O'Neal recorded the resonant frequency of the empty theatre space and recreated the cymatic image onto an entire wall within the lobby.

In 2011, O'Neal created "Wheels on the Bus in 7 Cymatic Sonatas" as a commission for the Charlotte Area Transit System (CATS) in Charlotte, NC. He recorded various sounds from within city buses and bus facilities and used the cymascope to create visual translations of each sound. The images are titled for the sounds they represent, such as "Bus Horn G#" and "Resonant Frequency of Main Garage F", and appear on the exteriors of two CATS facility buildings. Due to time and budget constraints, the work was created with 3M chrome film that simulates the reflective quality of O'Neal's mirrored paint, causing the appearance of the work to change with the appearance of the sky. In 2012, the work was named one of the 50 best public art projects by Americans for the Arts (AFTA).

=== Simulated rollercoaster painting ===
As part of his MFA thesis exhibition at SCAD in 2016, O'Neal reprogrammed an arcade roller coaster simulator to follow a paint brush as it moves across the painting surface, as though it were the track of a roller coaster. The brush strokes were filmed in a first-person perspective as the painting was created, and the footage was then synchronized with the movements of the roller coaster simulator. The simulator has six different "tracks" for the "rider" to choose from, each following a different brush along the twists and turns of the viscous paint. The work is titled "DIAPAUSE: Riding the Viscosity", and the painting created in the process is "Magic Mirror."

== Career ==
O'Neal's work includes public commissions from the Bechtler Museum of Modern Art, the Cobb Energy Performing Arts Center, and the Hanesbrands Theatre in the Milton Rhodes Center for the Arts. He has exhibited work at The Rose Art Museum at Brandeis University, the North Carolina Museum of Art, and the Santa Fe Art Institute; as well as galleries throughout the southeastern U.S., California, and Hong Kong.

=== Public art (selected) ===
O'Neal has been commissioned for several public works, including:

The Nine Muses, Entrance, Cobb Energy Performing Arts Centre Commission, Atlanta, GA. (2007)

Reactants, HanesBrands Theatre Lobby Wall, Winston-Salem Arts Council Commission, MiltonRhodes Center for the Arts, Winston-Salem, NC, (2009)

Wheels on the Bus in Seven Cymatic Sonatas, Art-in-Transit Commission, Charlotte Area Transit System, North Davidson Bus Facilities, Charlotte, NC (2012)

511.95 Hz of wine, Black Mountain College Museum + Arts Center, Asheville, NC (2013)

Golden Goal, Mercedes-Benz Stadium, Atlanta, GA (2017)

=== Solo exhibitions (selected) ===
O'Neal has had many solo exhibitions, including:

Jimmy O'Neal: Speculum, Van Every Gallery, Davidson College, Davidson, NC (2001)

Primacy of Movement, The Joie Lassiter Gallery, Charlotte, NC (2002)

Qualia, The Bill Lowe Gallery, Atlanta, GA (2008)

Jimmy O'Neal: What Essence Was It, That Time Was Of, SCAD, Savannah, GA (2016)

Adrift Within a Long Loving Look, Bill Lowe Gallery, Atlanta, GA (2018)

=== Group exhibitions (selected) ===
O'Neal's work has appeared in several group exhibitions, including:

Painting4, The Rose Art Museum, Brandeis University, Waltham, MA (2003)

Cross Currents, North Carolina Museum of Art, Raleigh, NC (2005)

Make it New, Asheville Art Museum, Asheville, NC (2007)

Paradiso Bill Lowe Gallery, Atlanta, GA (2012)

i feel ya: SCAD + André 3000 Benjamin, Art Basel Miami, Mana Miami Wynwood, Miami, FL (2014)

i feel ya: SCAD + André 3000 Benjamin, Savannah College of Art and Design Museum, Savannah, GA (2015)

Wrestling the Angel, Bechtler Museum of Modern Art, Charlotte, NC (2018)
