= Ernst Chladni =

German physicist, mathematician and musician

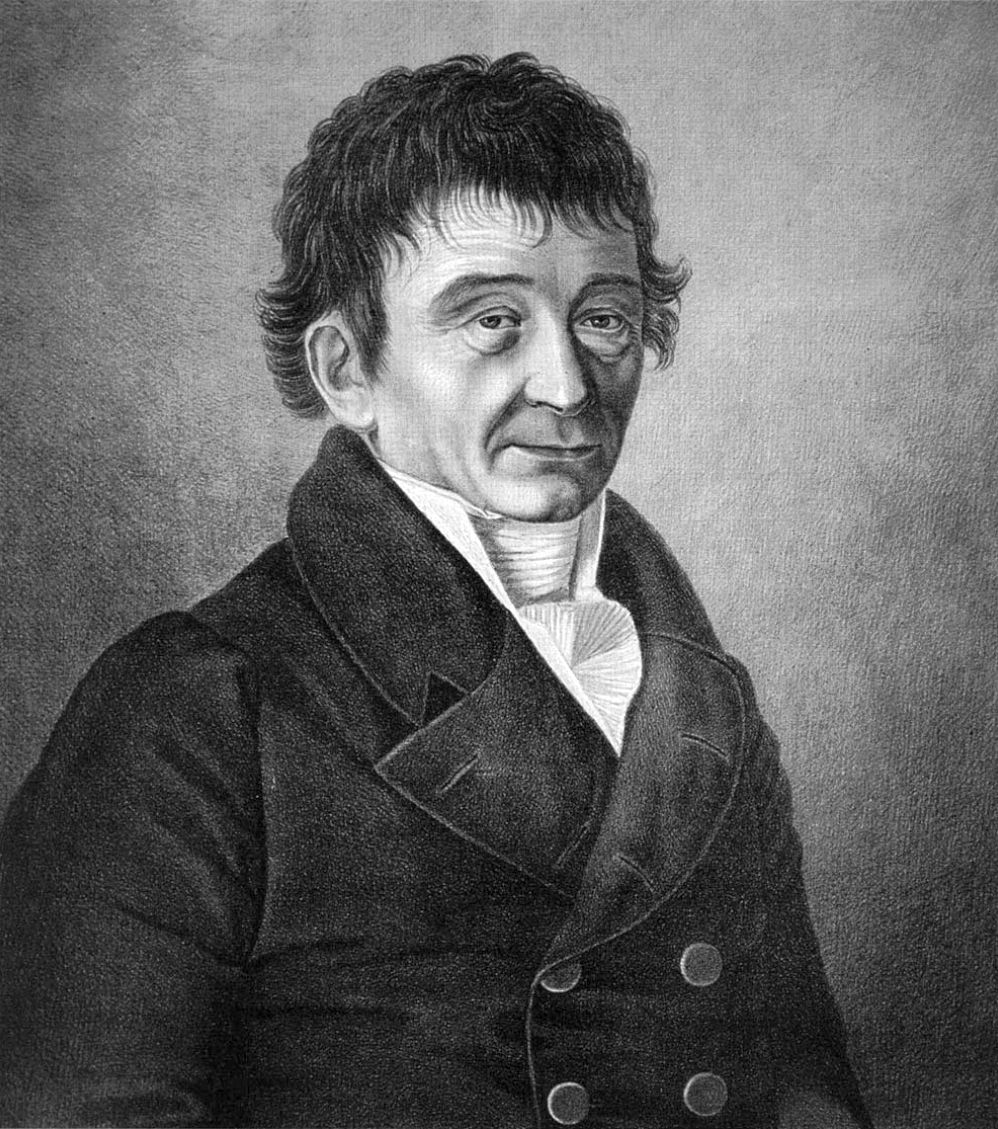
- Born: 30 November 1756; Wittenberg, Electorate of Saxony
- Died: 3 April 1827 (aged 70); Breslau, Prussia, German Confederation
- Known for: Study of acoustics; Chladni plates and figures; Estimating the speed of sound; Chladni's law; Theory of meteorites' origins
- Scientific career
- Fields: Physics
- Workplaces: University of Erlangen, University of Leipzig
- Doctoral advisor: Georg Christoph Lichtenberg
- Doctoral students: Ernst Heinrich Weber

Ernst Florens Friedrich Chladni (UK: /ˈklædni/, US: /ˈklɑːdni/, German: [ɛʁnst ˈfloːʁɛns ˈfʁiːdʁɪç ˈkladniː]; 30 November 1756 – 3 April 1827) was a German physicist and musician. His most important work, for which he is sometimes labeled the father of acoustics, included research on vibrating plates and the calculation of the speed of sound for different gases. He also undertook pioneering work in the study of meteorites and is regarded by some as the father of meteoritics.

== Early life ==
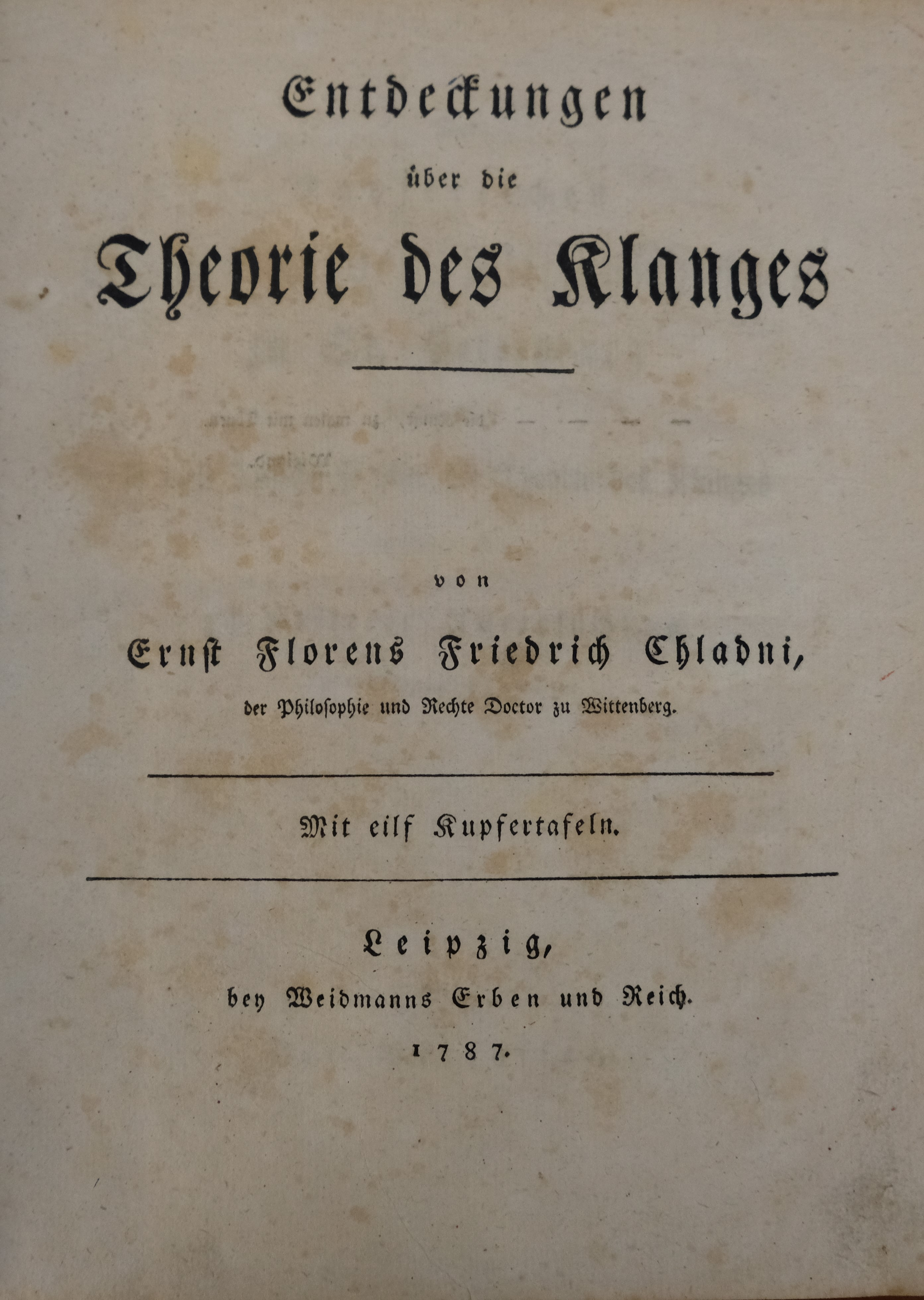
Title page of a 1787 copy of "Entdeckungen über die Theorie des Klanges"

Although Chladni was born in Wittenberg in Saxony, his family originated from Kremnica, then part of the Kingdom of Hungary and today a mining town in central Slovakia. Chladni has therefore been identified as German, Hungarian and Slovak.

Chladni came from an educated family of academics and learned men. Chladni's great-grandfather, the Lutheran clergyman Georg Chladni (1637–1692), had left Kremnica in 1673 during the Counter Reformation. Chladni's grandfather, Martin Chladni (1669–1725), was also a Lutheran theologian and, in 1710, became professor of theology at the University of Wittenberg. He was dean of the theology faculty in 1720–1721 and later became the university's rector. Chladni's uncle, Justus Georg Chladni (1701–1765), was a law professor at the university. Another uncle, Johann Martin Chladni (1710–1759), was a theologian, a historian and a professor at the University of Erlangen and the University of Leipzig.

Chladni's father, Ernst Martin Chladni (1715–1782), was a law professor and rector of the University of Wittenberg. He had joined the law faculty there in 1746. Chladni's mother was Johanna Sophia and he was an only child. His father disapproved of his son's interest in science and insisted that Chladni would become a lawyer.

== Career ==
Chladni studied law and philosophy in Wittenberg and Leipzig, obtaining a law degree from the University of Leipzig in 1782. That same year, his father died and he turned to physics in earnest. He gave lectures on law, mathematics, and natural sciences at the University of Wittenberg from 1783 to 1792. During this time, he began his first experiments with acoustics.

== Chladni figures ==
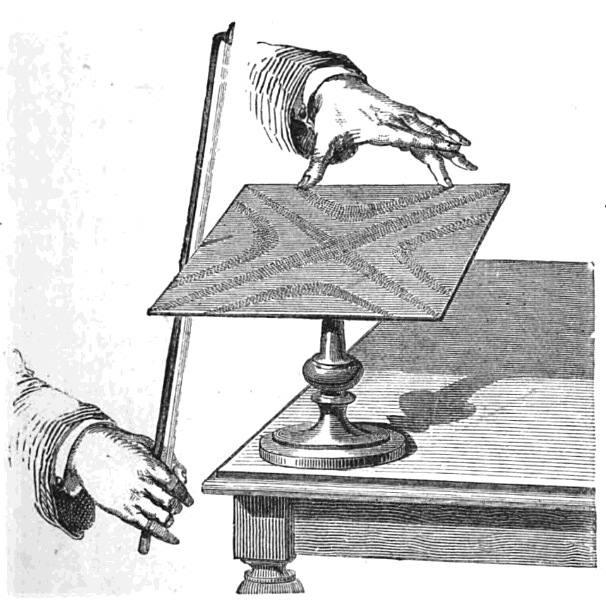
Chladni's method of creating Chladni figures

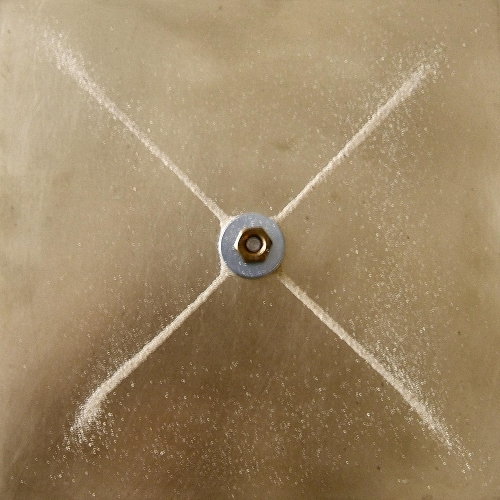
Chladni figure on a rectangular plate supported in center

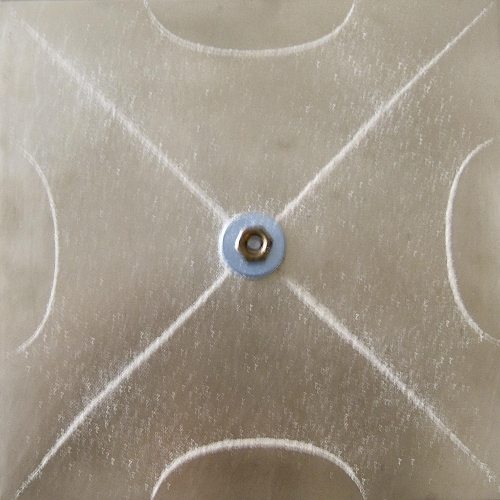
Another mode of the same plate

One of Chladni's best-known achievements was inventing a technique to show the various modes of vibration on a rigid surface, known as Chladni figures or Chladni patterns due to the various shapes or patterns created by various modes. When resonating, a plate or membrane is divided into regions that vibrate in opposite directions, bounded by lines where no vibration occurs (nodal lines). Chladni repeated the pioneering experiments of Robert Hooke who, on 8 July, 1680, had observed the nodal patterns associated with the vibrations of glass plates. Hooke ran a violin bow along the edge of a plate covered with flour and saw the nodal patterns emerge. Hooke had already observed this 9 years earlier in 1671, and in turn was inspired by a suggestion he read in Bacon's Sylva Sylvarum, where Bacon describes rubbing the rim of a glass filled with water and observing the water "frisk and sprinkle". Hooke presented this in 1680 to the Royal Society, and there was no follow-up.

Chladni's technique, first published in 1787 in his book Entdeckungen über die Theorie des Klanges ("Discoveries in the Theory of Sound"), consisted of drawing a bow over a piece of metal whose surface was lightly covered with sand. The plate was bowed until it reached resonance, when the vibration causes the sand to move and concentrate along the nodal lines where the surface is still, outlining the nodal lines. The patterns formed by these lines are what are now called Chladni figures. Similar nodal patterns can also be found by assembling microscale materials on Faraday waves.

Chladni had visited the Paris Academy in 1808 and had demonstrated the vibration patterns before an audience that included not only the leading French scientists but Napoleon himself; Napoleon set a prize for the best mathematical explanation. Sophie Germain's answer, although rejected due to flaws, was the only entry with the correct approach.

Variations of this technique are still commonly used in the design and construction of acoustic instruments such as violins, guitars, and cellos. Since the 20th century, it has become more common to place a loudspeaker driven by an electronic signal generator over or under the plate to achieve a more precise adjustable frequency.

In quantum mechanics, Chladni figures ("nodal patterns") are known to be related to the solutions of the Schrödinger equation for one-electron atoms, and the mathematics describing them was used by Erwin Schrödinger to arrive at the understanding of electron orbitals.

== Musical instruments ==
Chladni patterns of a guitar backplate

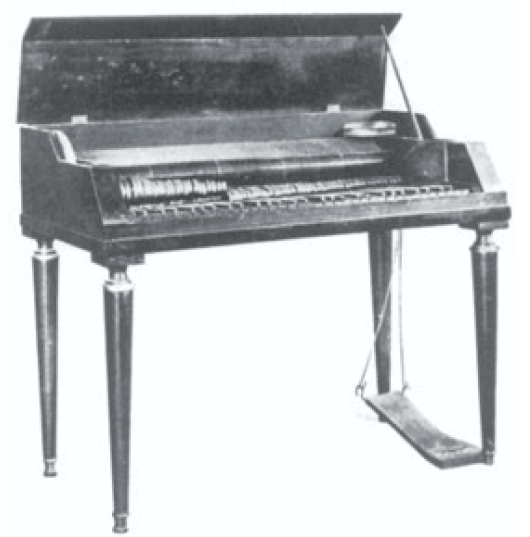
Clavicylinder

Since at least 1738, a musical instrument called a Glasspiel or verrillon, created by filling beer glasses with varying amounts of water, was popular in Europe. The beer glasses were struck by wooden mallets shaped like spoons to produce "church and other solemn music". Benjamin Franklin was sufficiently impressed by a verrillon performance on a visit to London in 1757 that he created his own instrument, the glass harmonica, in 1762. Franklin's harmonica inspired several other instruments, including two created by Chladni. In 1791, Chladni invented the musical instrument called the euphon (not to be confused with the brass instrument euphonium), consisting of glass rods used to play different pitches. Chladni's euphon is the direct ancestor of the modern day musical instrument known as the Cristal Baschet. Chladni also improved on Hooke's "musical cylinder" to produce another instrument, the clavicylinder, in 1799.

Chladni travelled throughout Europe with his instruments giving demonstrations.

== Contributions to meteoritics ==
Chladni became interested in meteoritics following a conversation he had with Georg Christoph Lichtenberg about a fireball that Lichtenberg supposedly saw in the Gӧttingen sky in November 1791. Inspired by this report, Chladni researched reports of similar phenomena as well as reports of other falling masses across Europe and North America within the last century. Based on the uniformity among these sightings, he concluded that the phenomena of fireballs and falling masses must be genuine.

This led him to publish Über den Ursprung der von Pallas gefundenen und anderer ihr ähnlicher Eisenmassen und über einige damit in Verbindung stehende Naturerscheinungen ("On the Origin of the Iron Masses Found by Pallas and Others Similar to it, and on Some Associated Natural Phenomena") in 1794. In this book he proposed that meteorites have an extraterrestrial origin. He argued that this would explain the high speeds of the falling masses as well as linking the masses to the fireballs; they glow intensely bright as they enter the Earth's atmosphere. He hypothesized that these meteorites were chunks of material that had either never been consolidated in the formation of larger masses or were debris from the formation and destruction of planets. This was a controversial statement at the time, since meteorites were thought to be of volcanic origin. Additionally, his claims challenged the established belief that nothing existed beyond the Moon except for other stars and planets. Indeed, this supposed emptiness of space had fascinated Chladni as a child when he learned about the relatively large distance between Mars and Jupiter, where the Asteroid Belt is now known to exist. This observation factored into his account for the origins of meteorites.

Chladni's book was initially ridiculed by contemporary physicists, including Lichtenberg. Still, his writings sparked a curiosity that eventually led to more researchers supporting his theory. In 1795, a large stony meteorite was observed during its fall to Earth at a cottage near Wold Newton in Yorkshire, England and a piece of it, known as the Wold Cottage meteorite, was given to the British chemist Edward Howard who, along with French mineralogist Jacques de Bournon, carefully analyzed its composition and concluded that an extraterrestrial origin was likely, noting that the sample bore a strong resemblance to a sample of a meteorite from an early meteor shower in Siena, Italy. Although that event had been attributed to an eruption of Mount Vesuvius a few hundred kilometers away, no similar volcanoes exists within the same range of Wold Newton, with the closest being Hekla in Iceland. In 1803, the physicist and astronomer Jean Baptiste Biot was commissioned by the French Minister of the Interior to investigate a meteor shower over L'Aigle in northern France that had peppered the town with thousands of meteorite fragments. Unlike Chladni's book and the scientific publication by Howard and de Bournon, Biot's lively report became popular and persuaded more people to take Chladni's insights seriously.

Chladni's insights have led some in the field to call him the "father of meteoritics" while others have been more conservative with their appraisal of Chladni's contributions to the field.

Chladni continued to develop his record of meteorite sightings throughout the next several decades as well as amassing a collection of meteorite samples. He donated this collection to the Mineralogical Museum of Berlin University in 1827 and it now resides in the Museum of Natural History at Humboldt University of Berlin.

A mineral, first described in 1993 from the Carlton (IIICD) iron meteorite, was named chladniite in his honor.

== Other work ==
Chladni discovered Chladni's law, a simple algebraic relation for approximating the modal frequencies of the free oscillations of plates and other bodies.

Chladni estimated sound velocities in different gases by placing those gases in an organ pipe and measuring the characteristics of the sounds that emerged when the pipe was played. This built on work on measuring the speed of sound in air that Pierre Gassendi began in 1635.

== Death ==
Chladni died on 3 April 1827, in Breslau, Lower Silesia, then part of the Kingdom of Prussia and today the city of Wrocław in southwestern Poland. Chladni crater on the Moon was named after him in 1935.

== Works ==
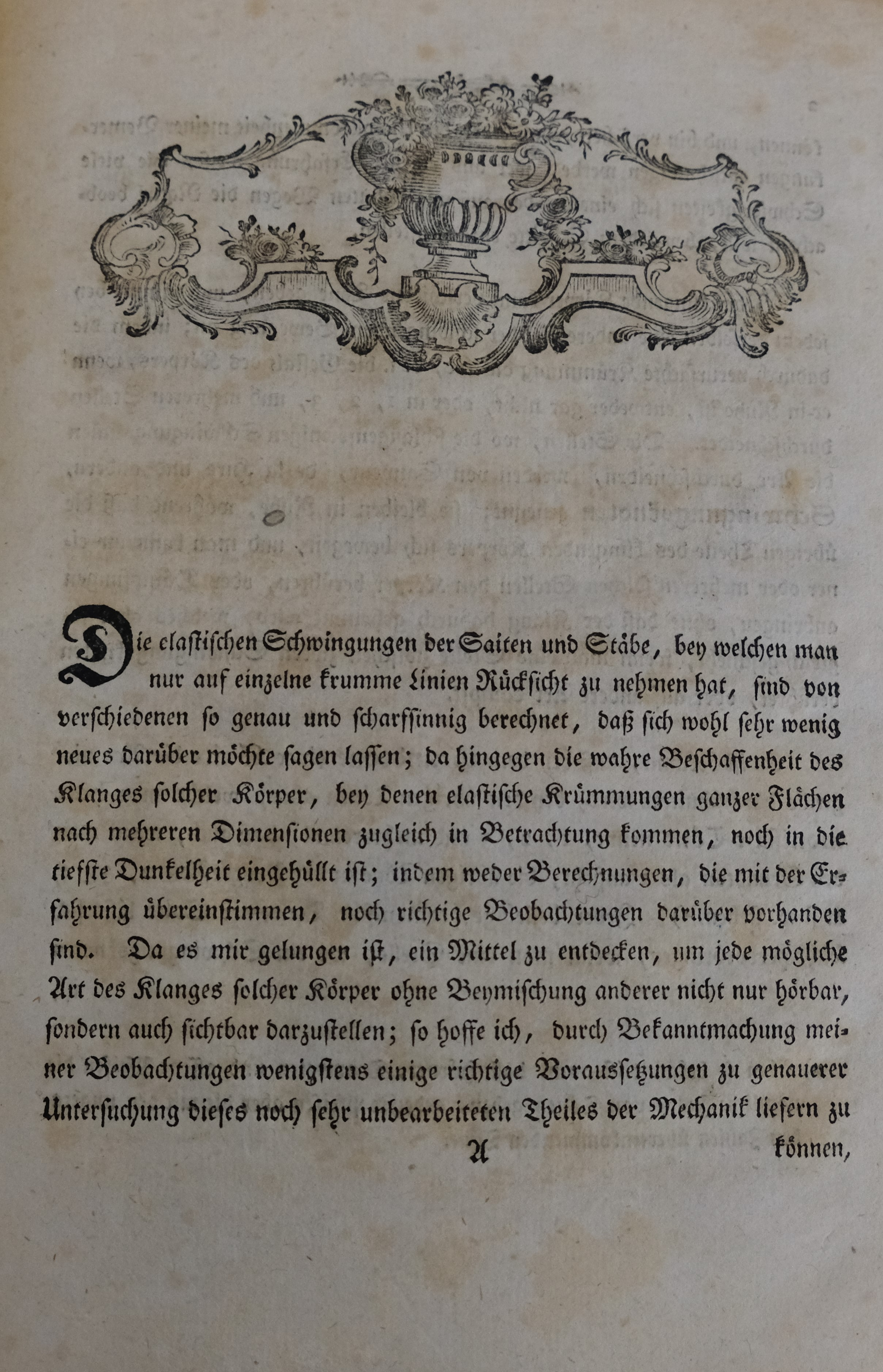
- First page of a 1787 copy of "Entdeckungen über die Theorie des Klanges"
  Entdeckungen über die Theorie des Klanges, Leipzig 1787.
- Die Akustik, Leipzig 1802. French translation: Traité d'acoustique, Paris 1809. Also in Neue Beiträge zur Akustik, Leipzig 1817.
- Beiträge zur praktischen Akustik und zur Lehre vom Instrumentbau, Leipzig 1821 (OCLC 457664981).
- Über den Ursprung der von Pallas gefundenen und anderer ihr ähnlicher Eisenmassen at the HathiTrust Digital Library, Leipzig/Riga 1794.
- Über Feuermeteore, Vienna 1820.
- Über die Hervorbringung der menschlichen Sprachlaute, Leipzig 1824.
- Kurze Übersicht der Schall und Klanglehre, nebst einem Anhange die Entwickelung und Anordnung der Tonverhältnisse betreffend, Mainz 1827.

== Gallery ==
Chladni plates

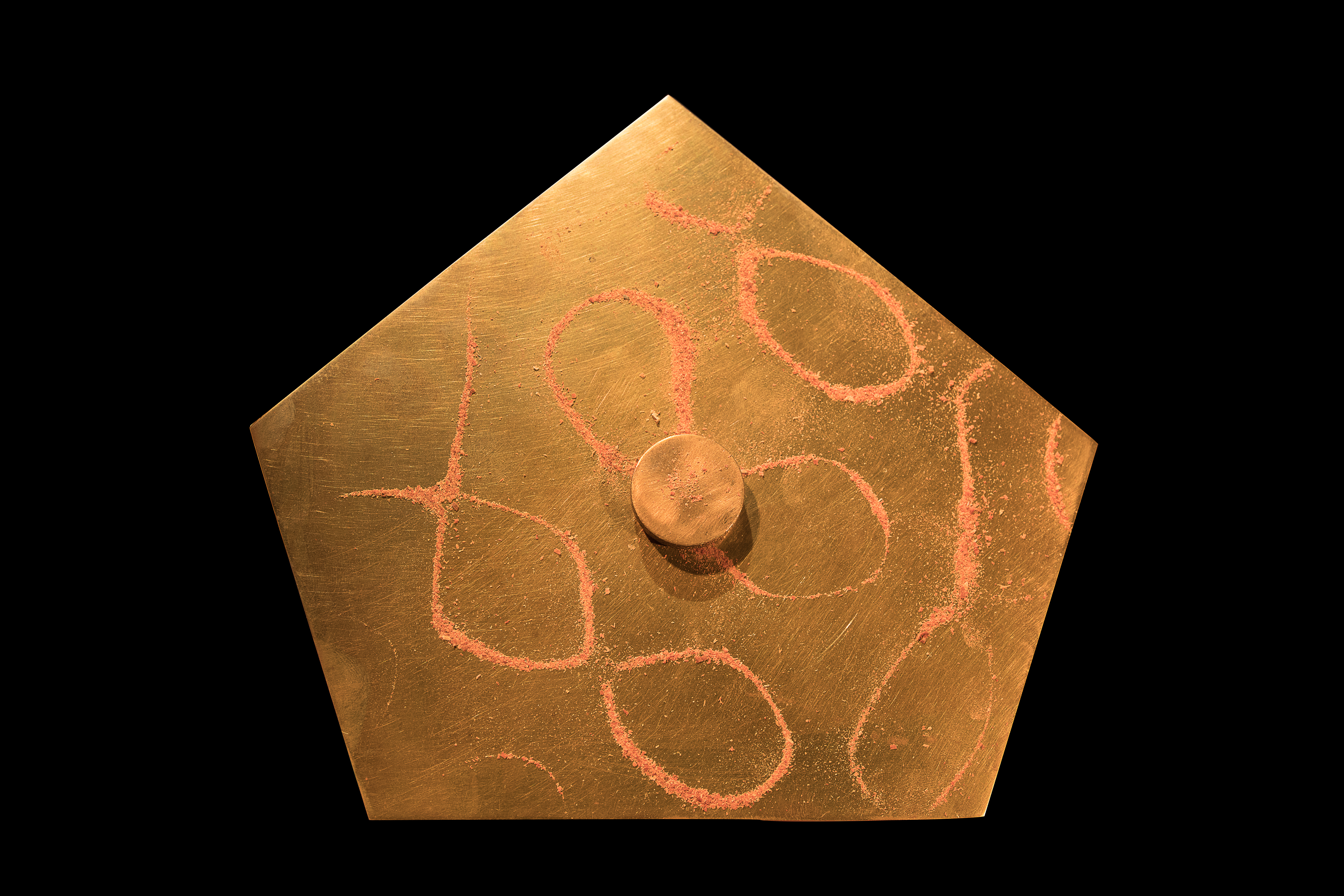
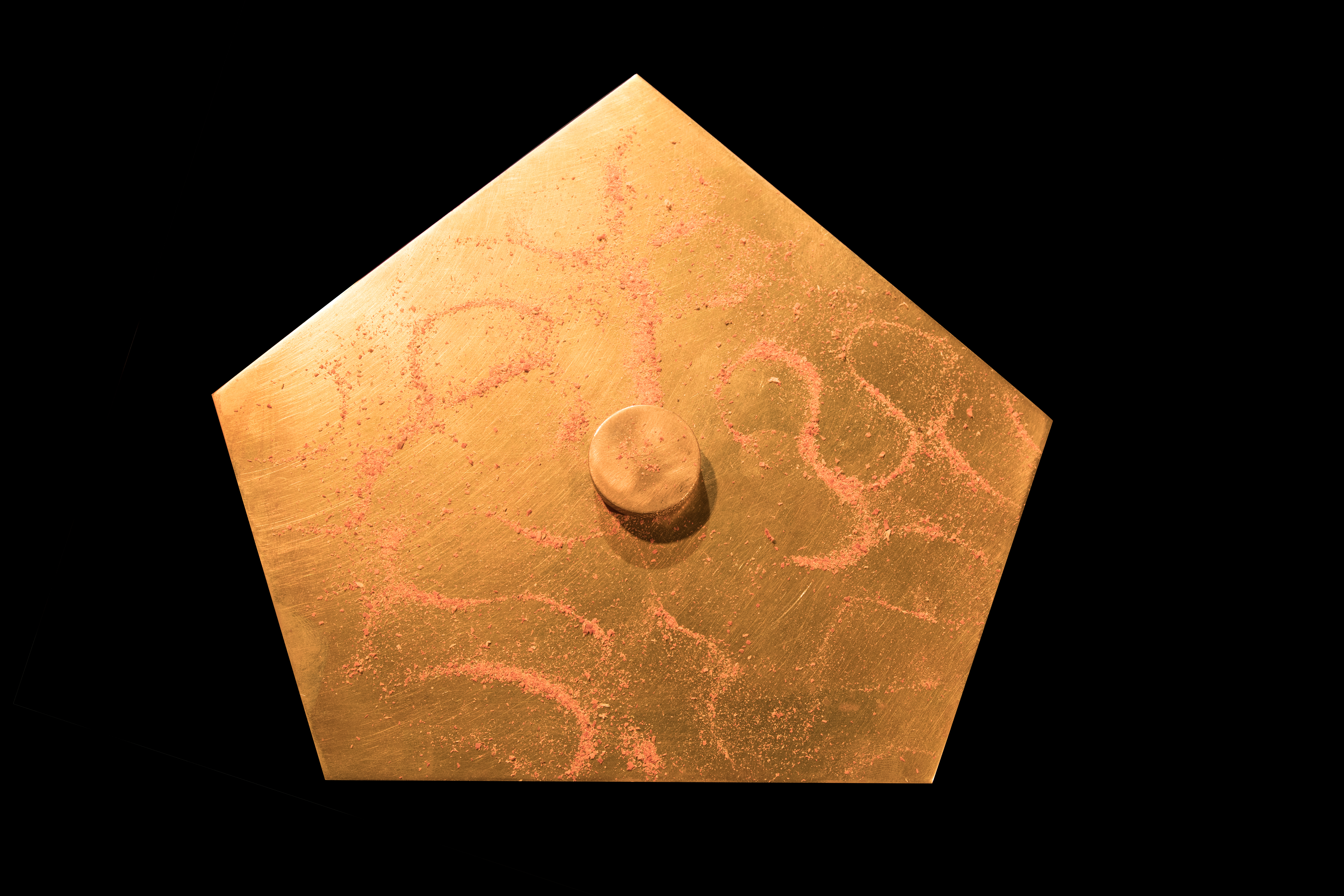
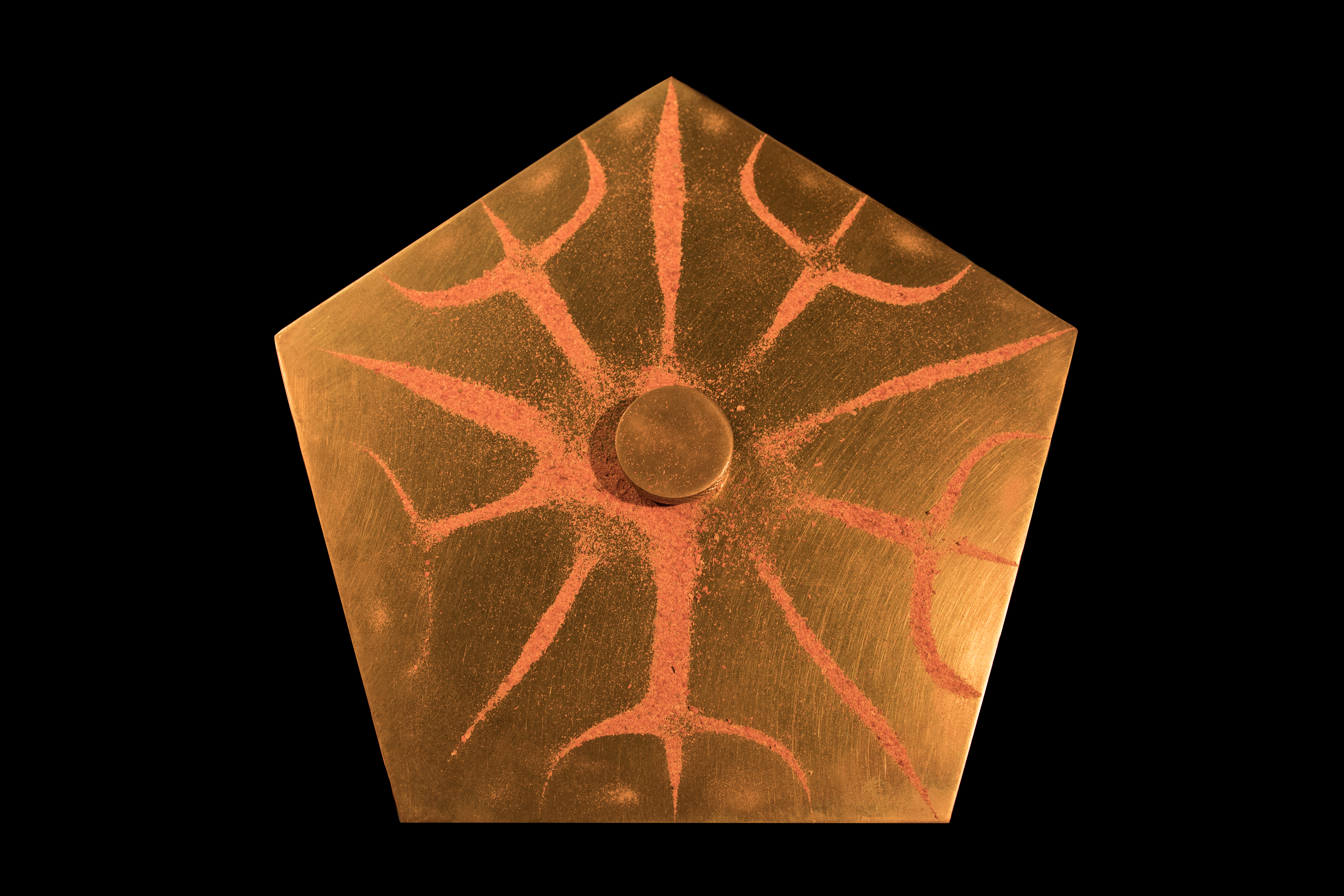
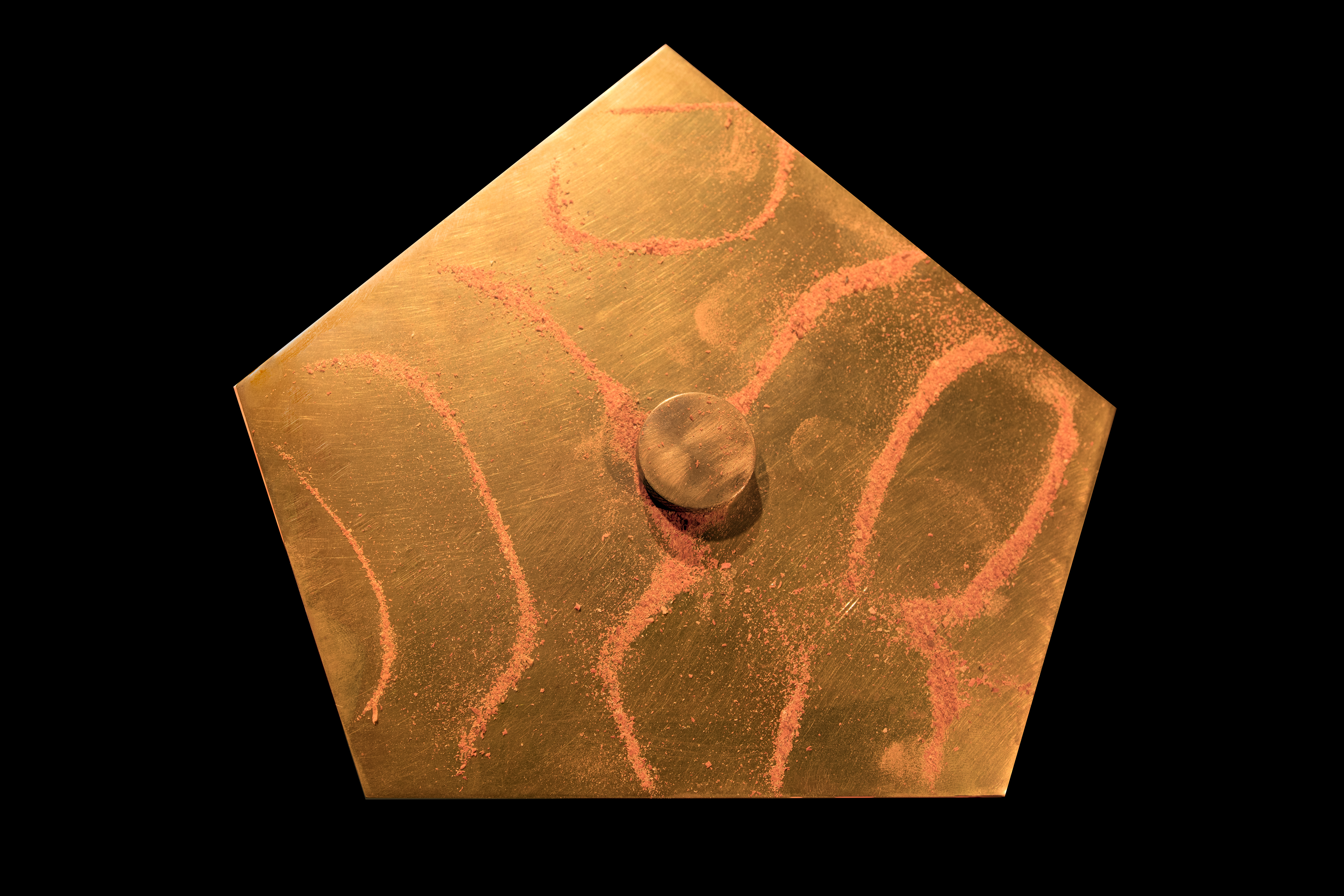
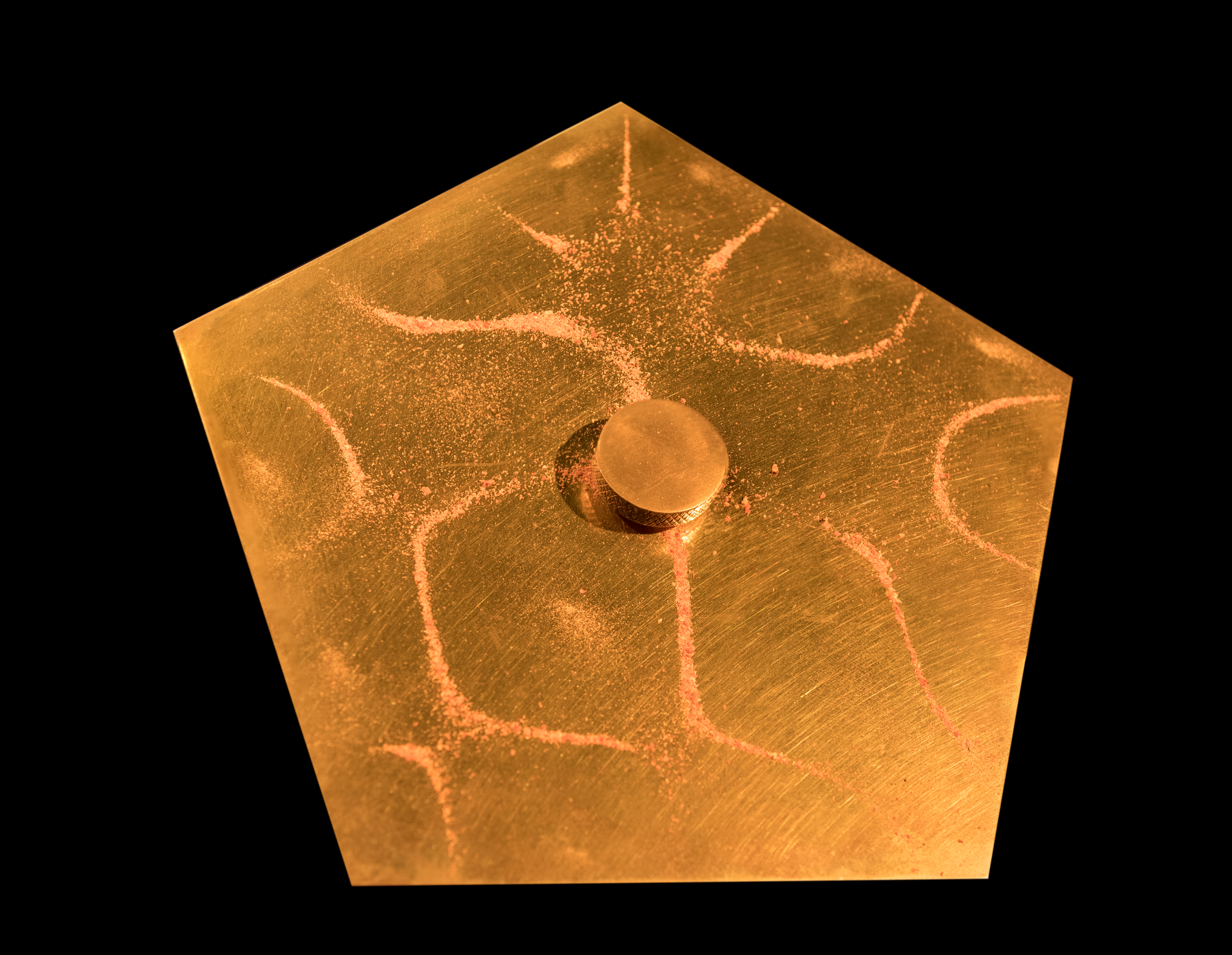
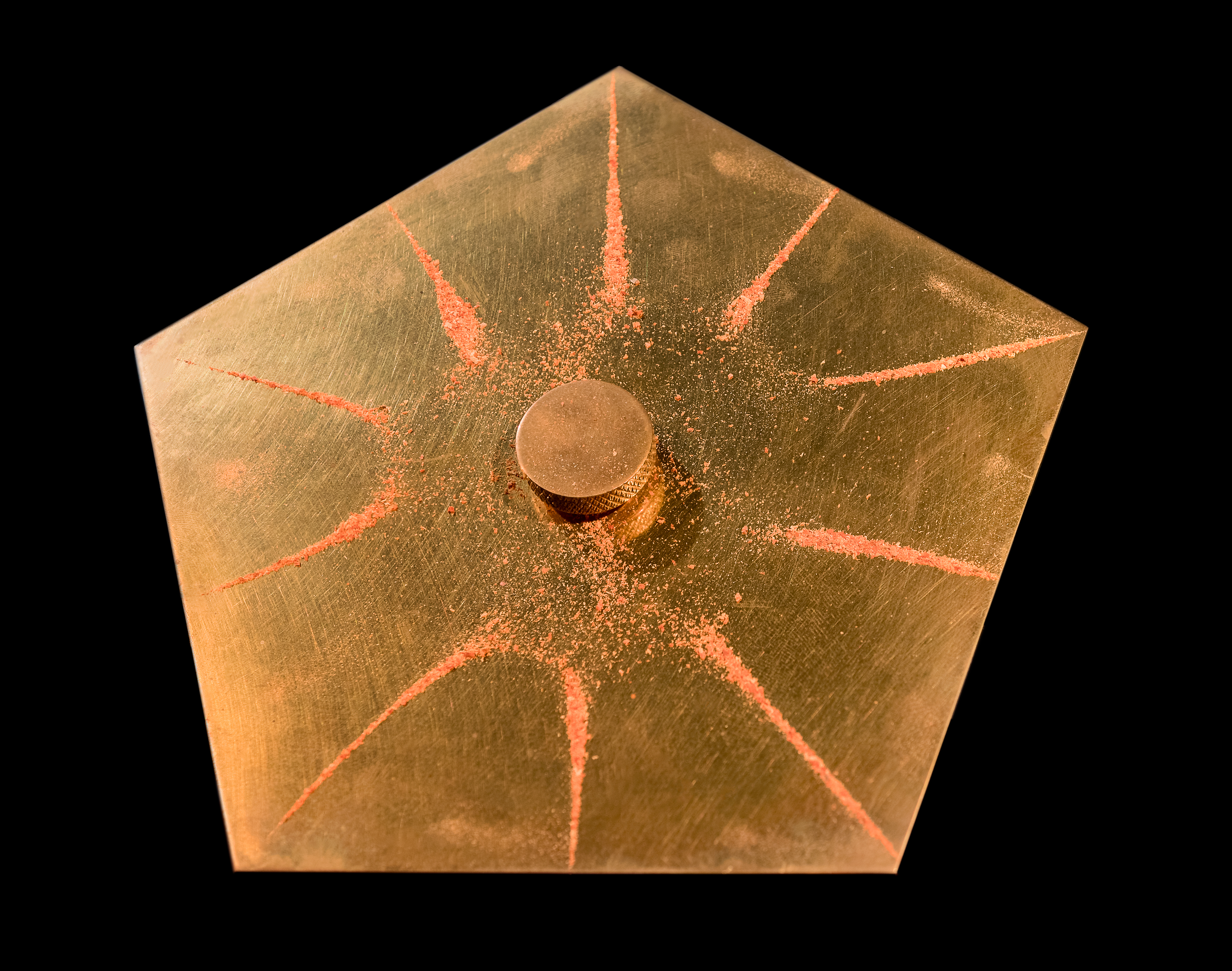
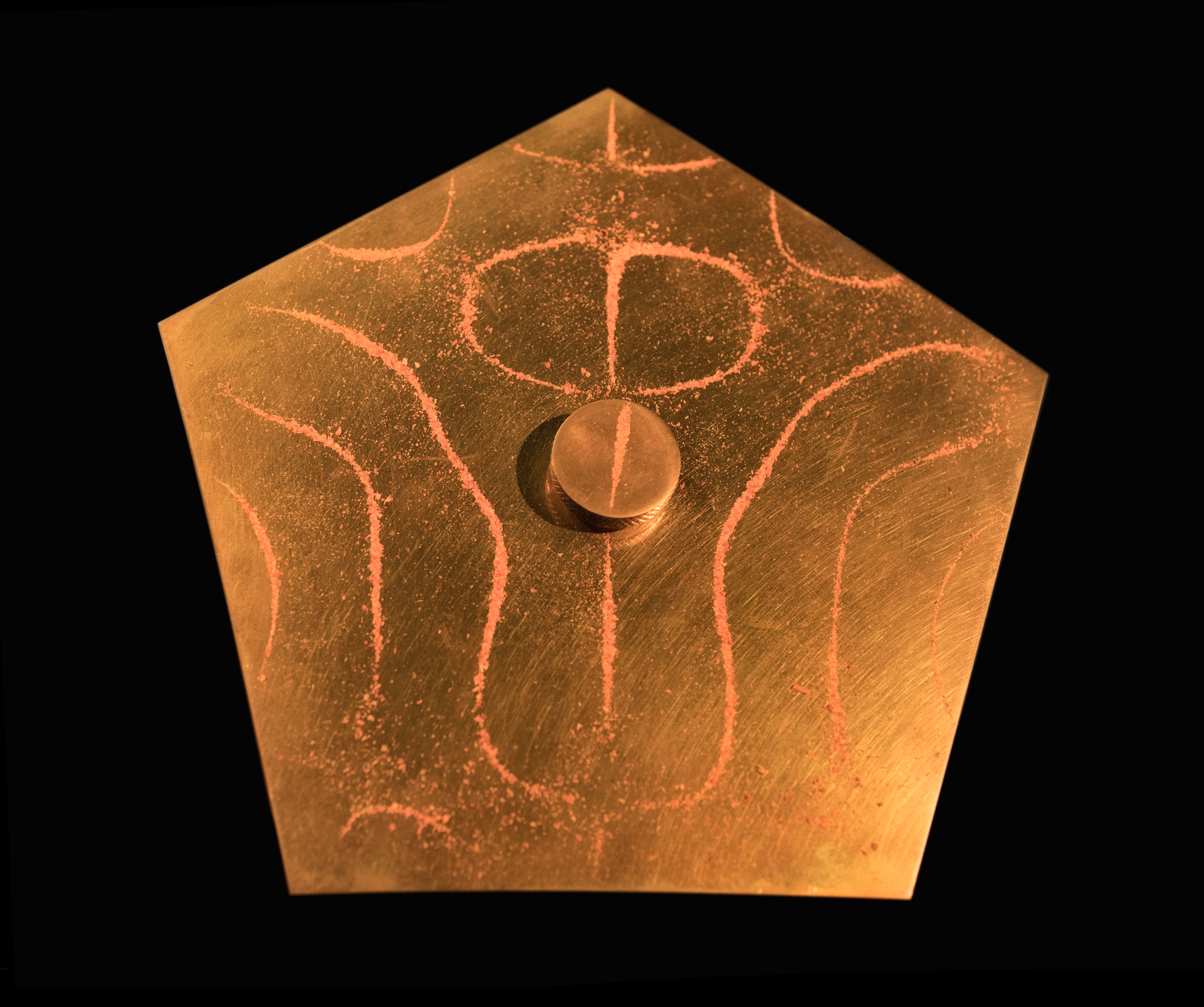
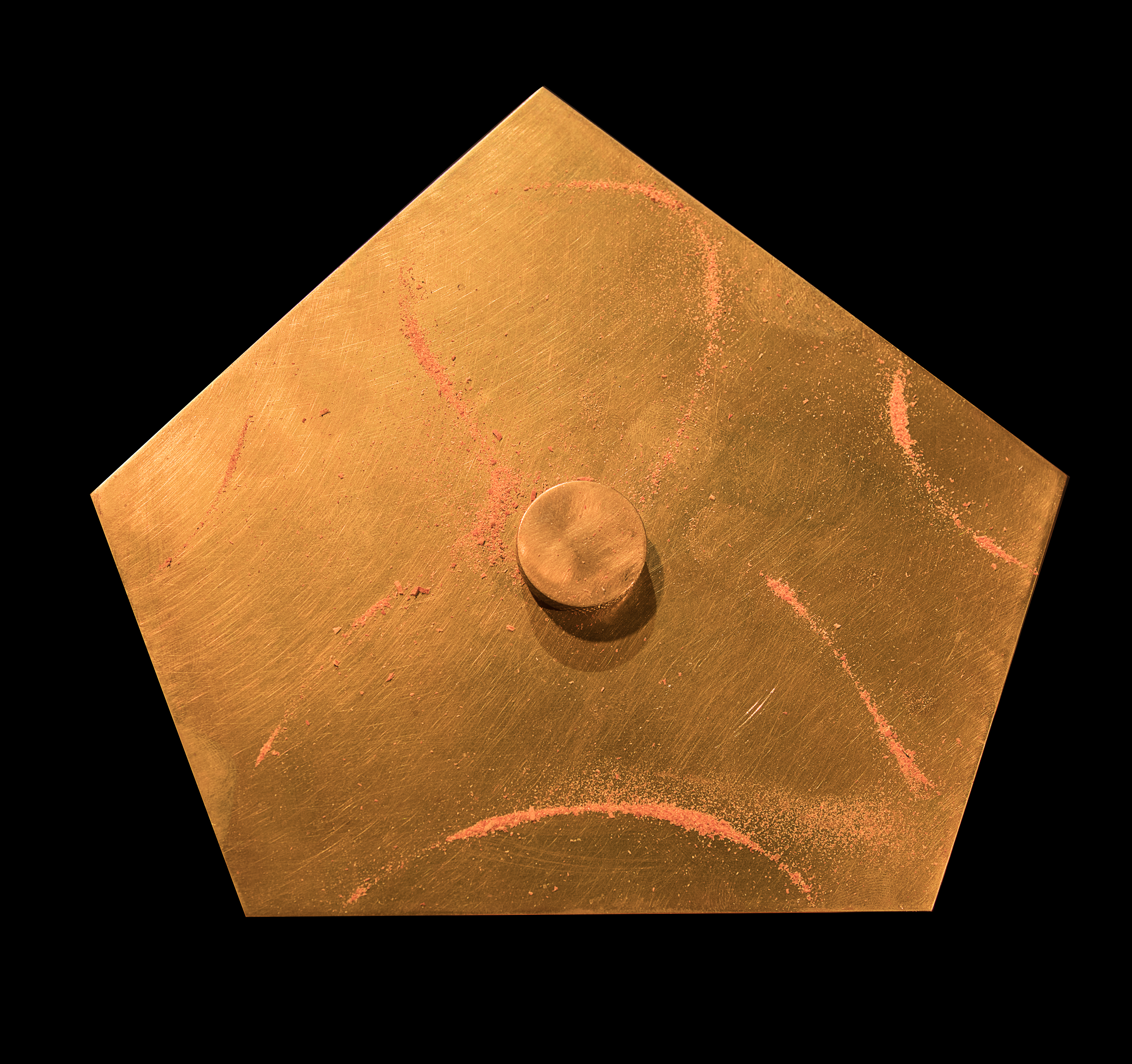
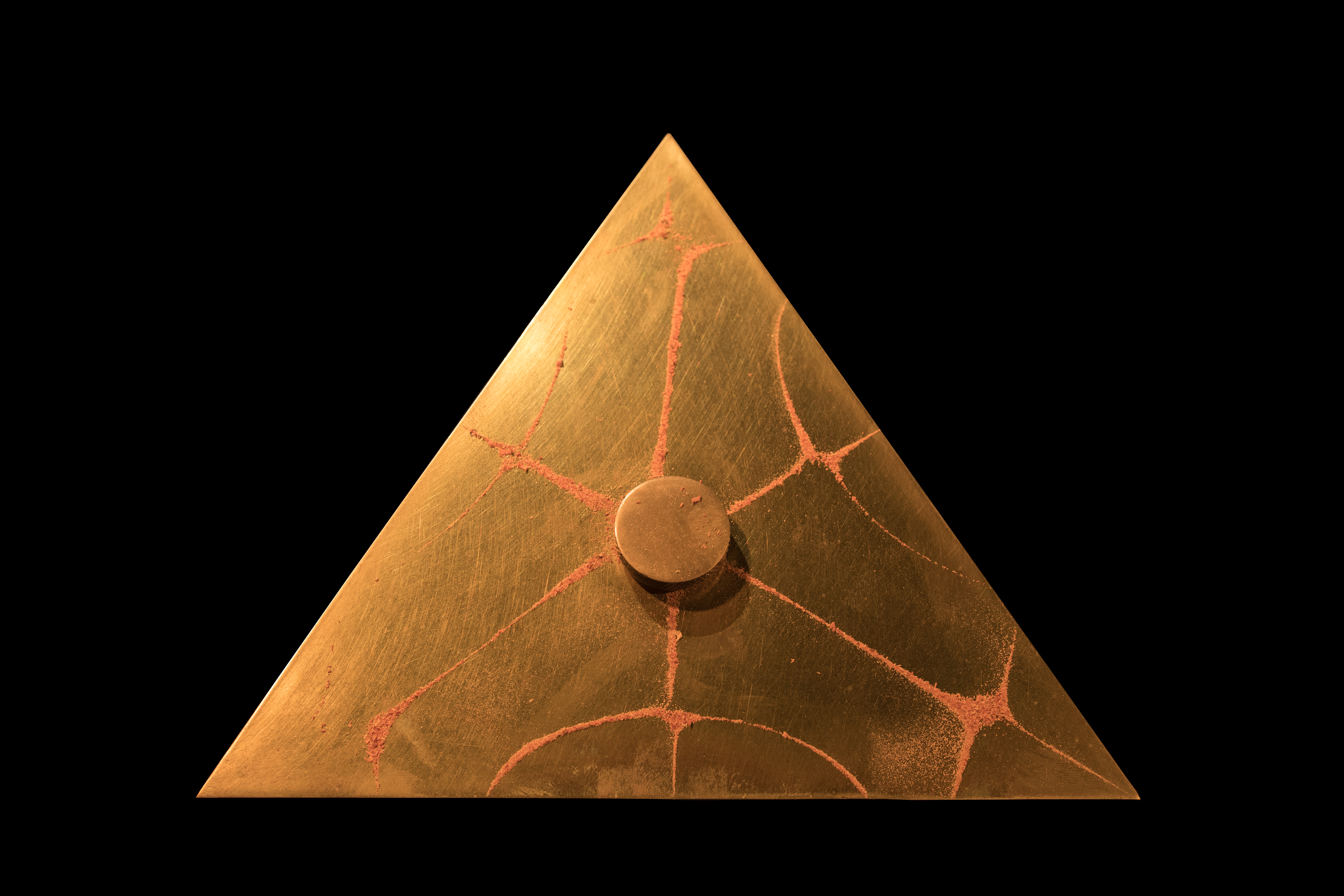
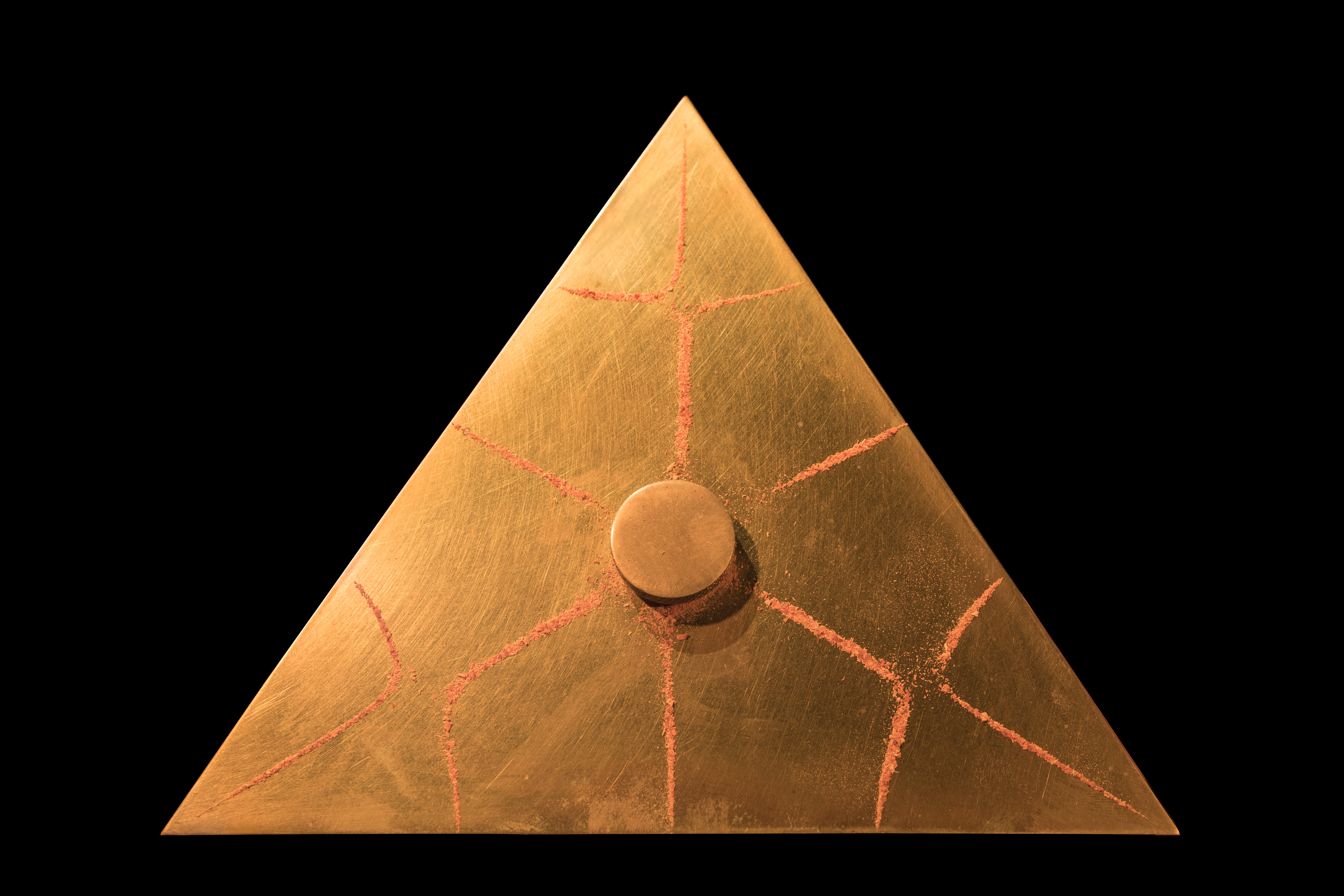
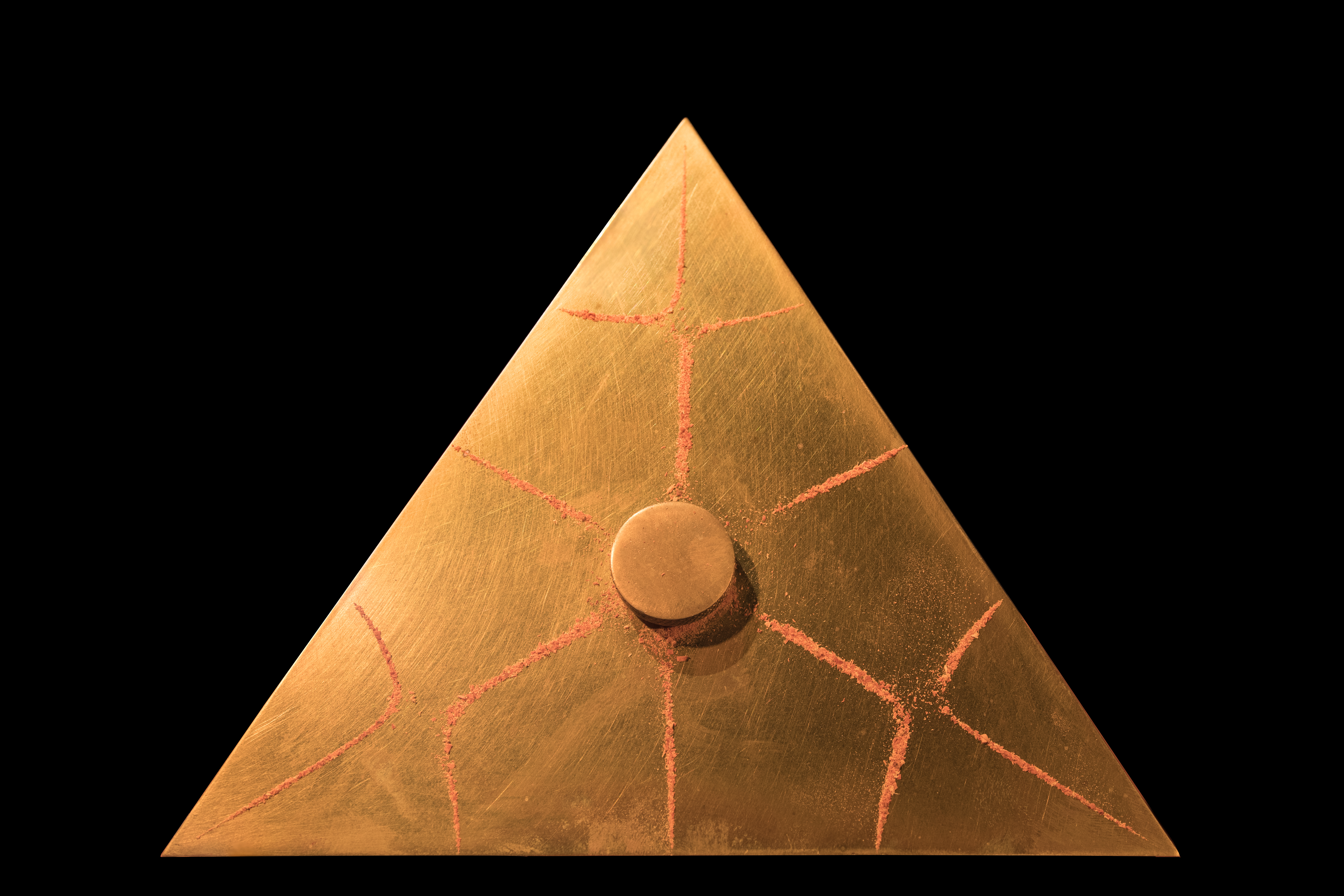
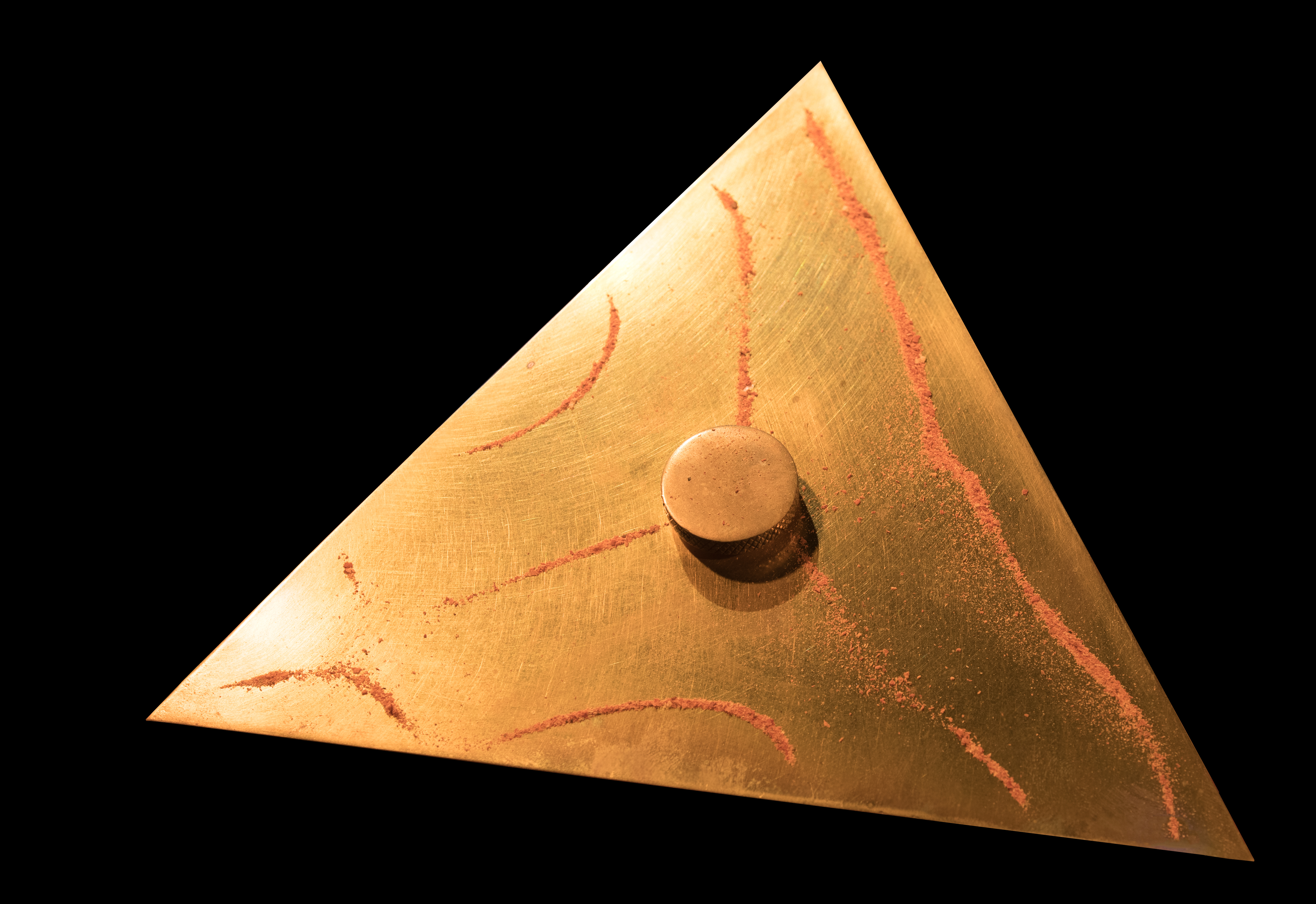
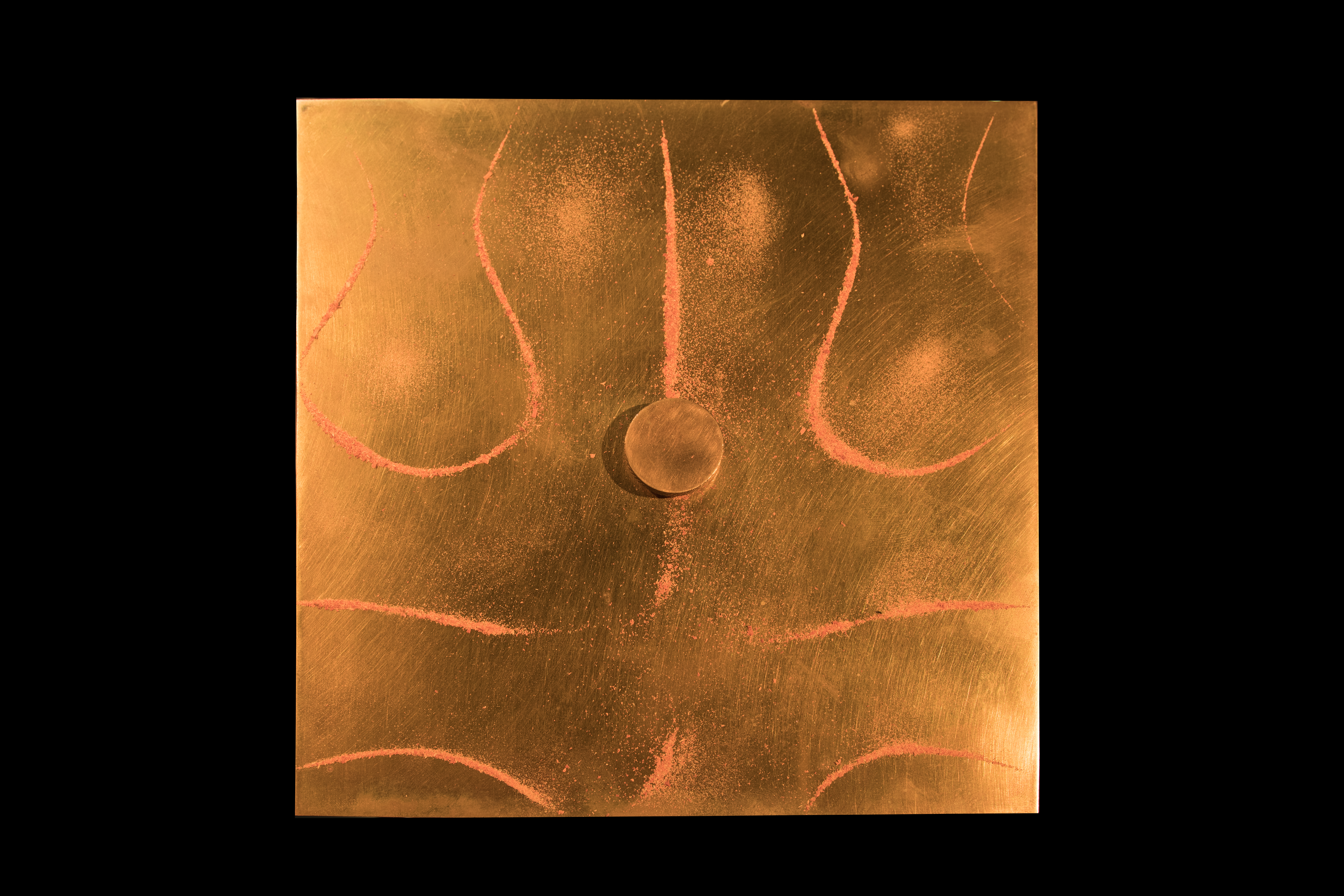
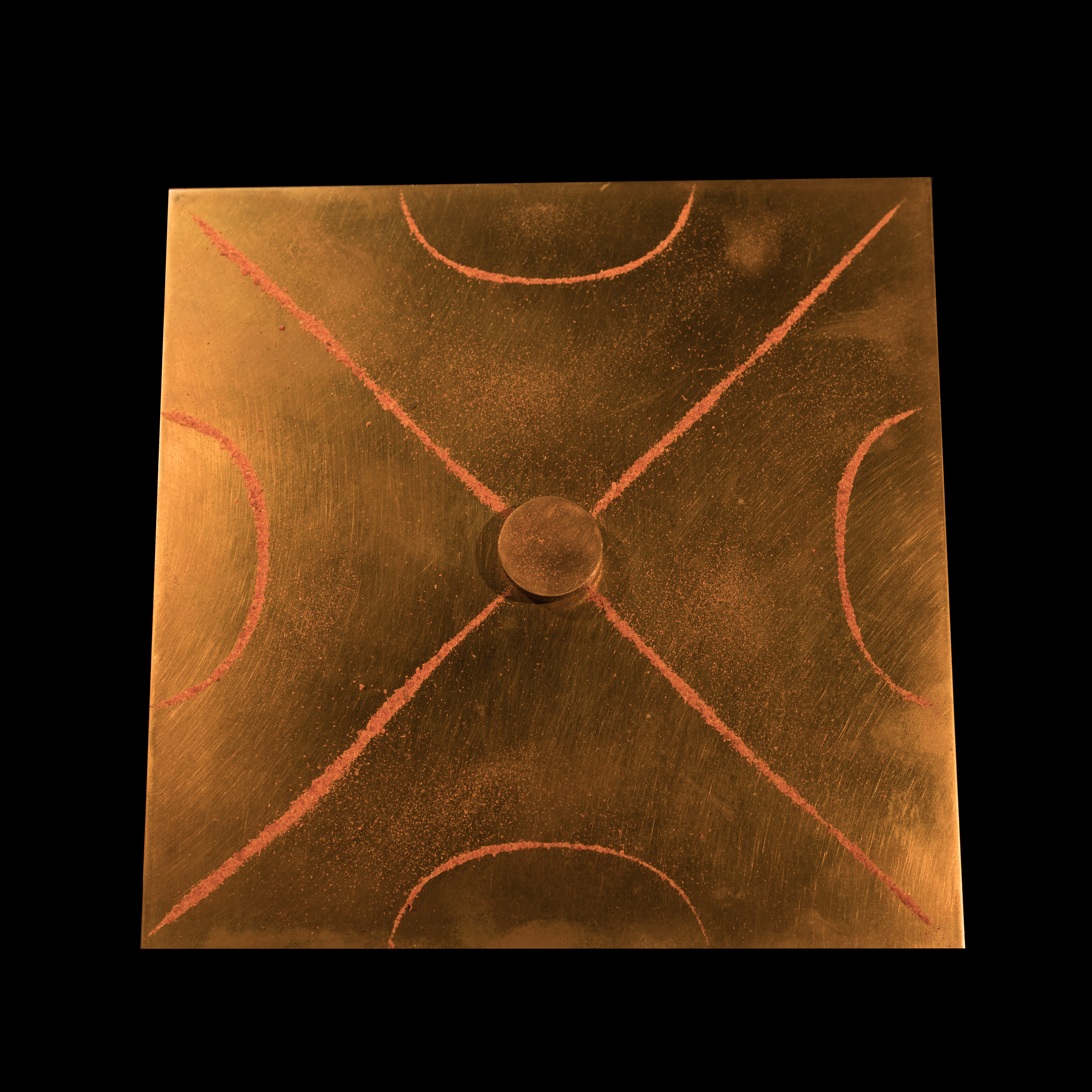
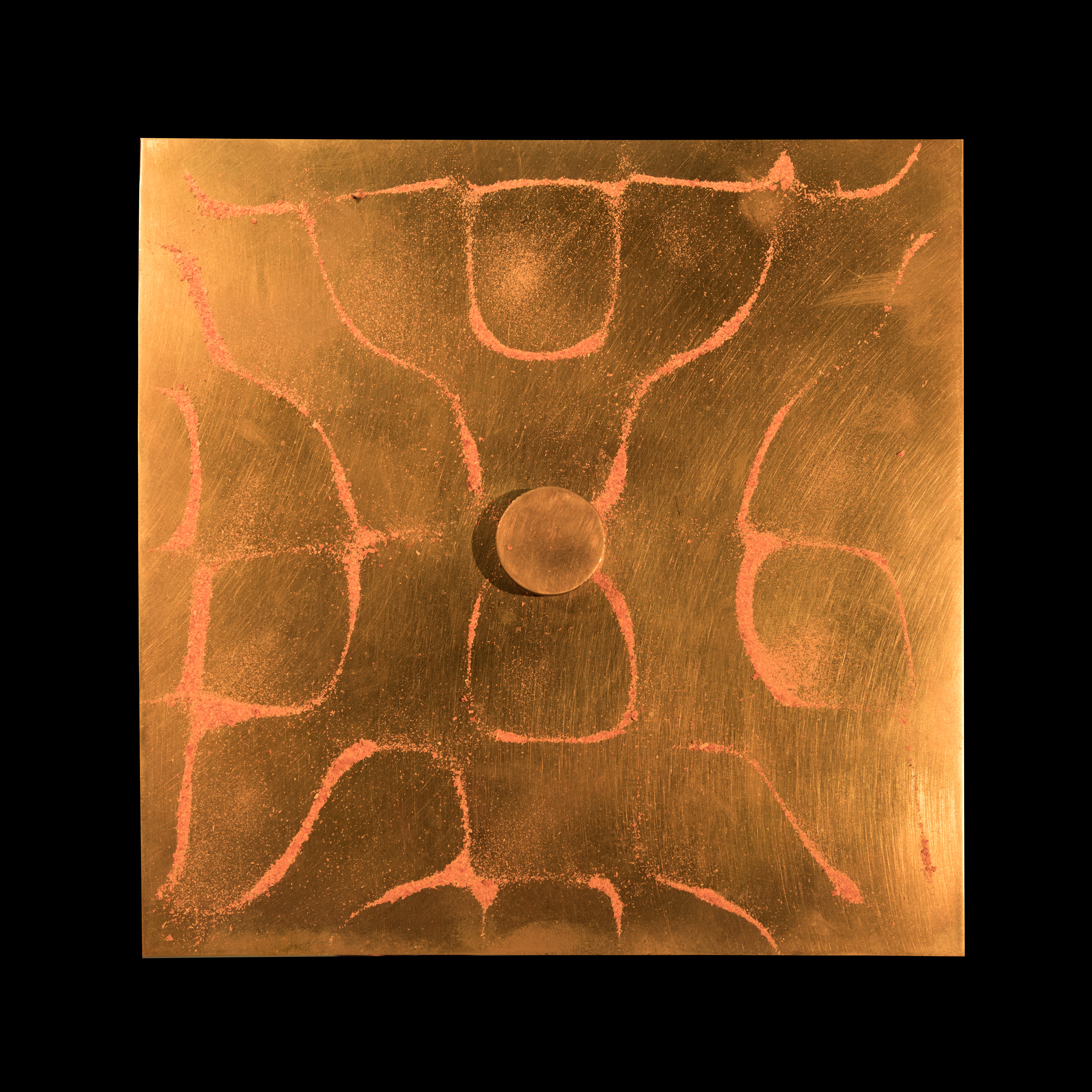
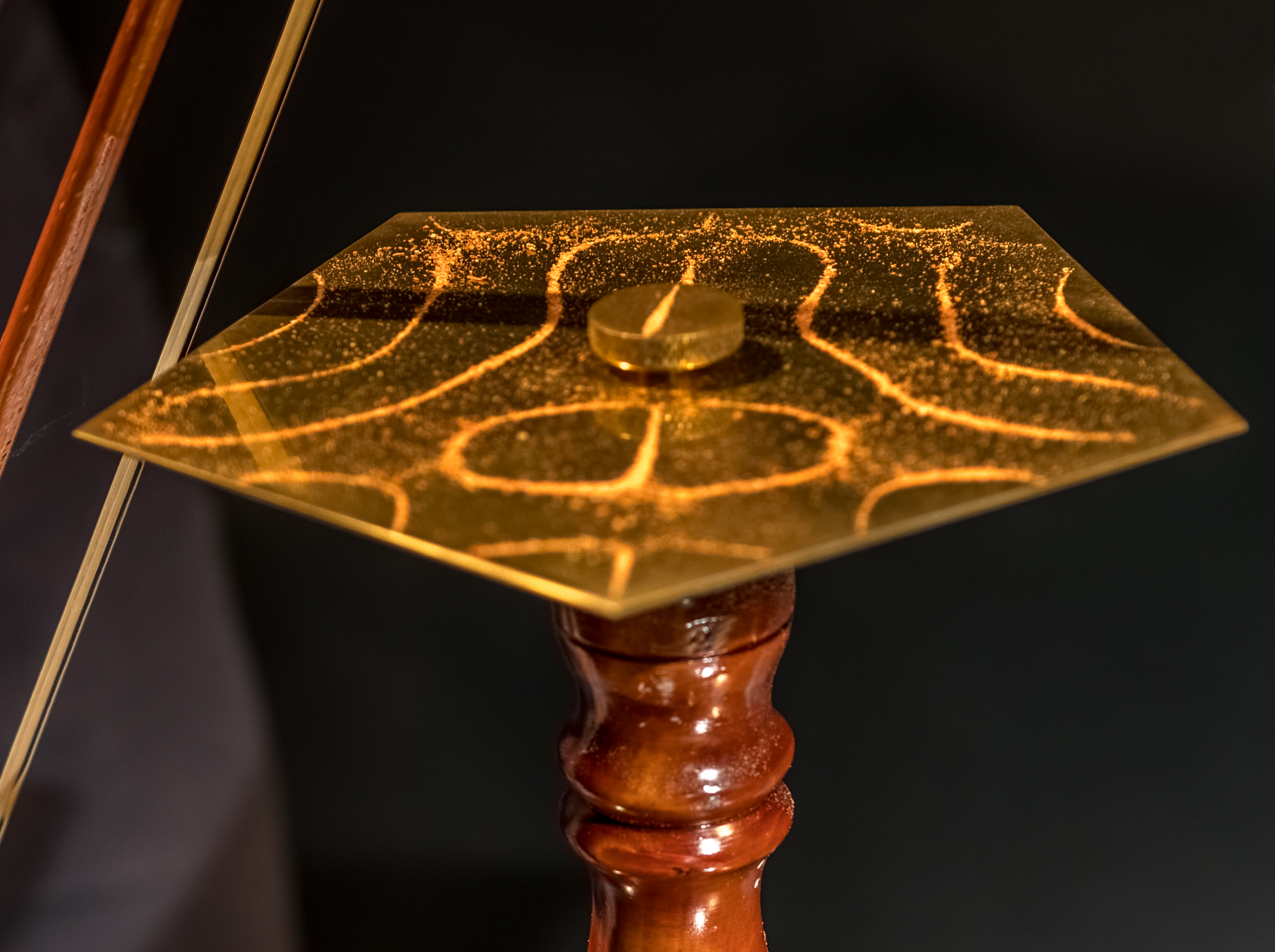
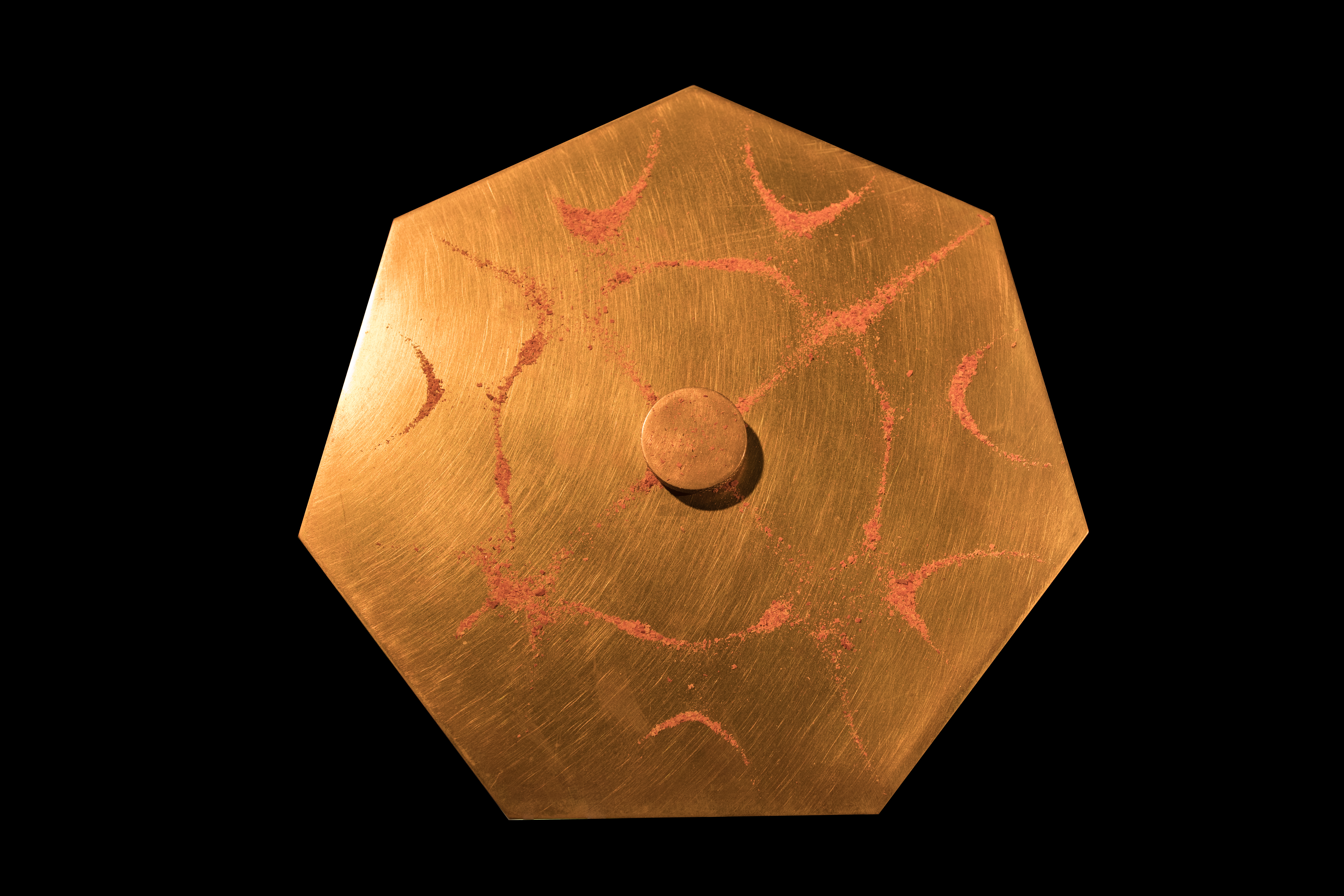
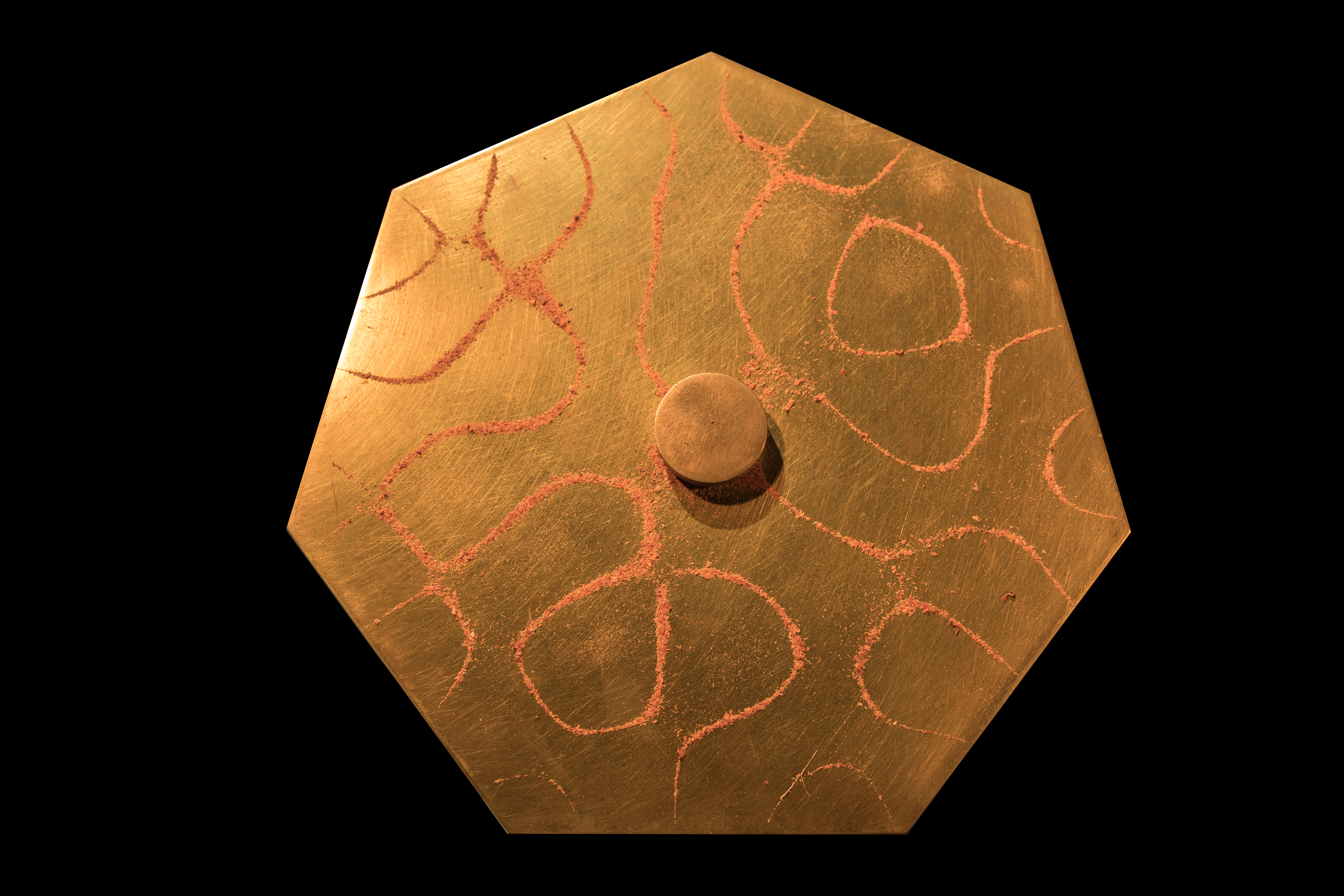
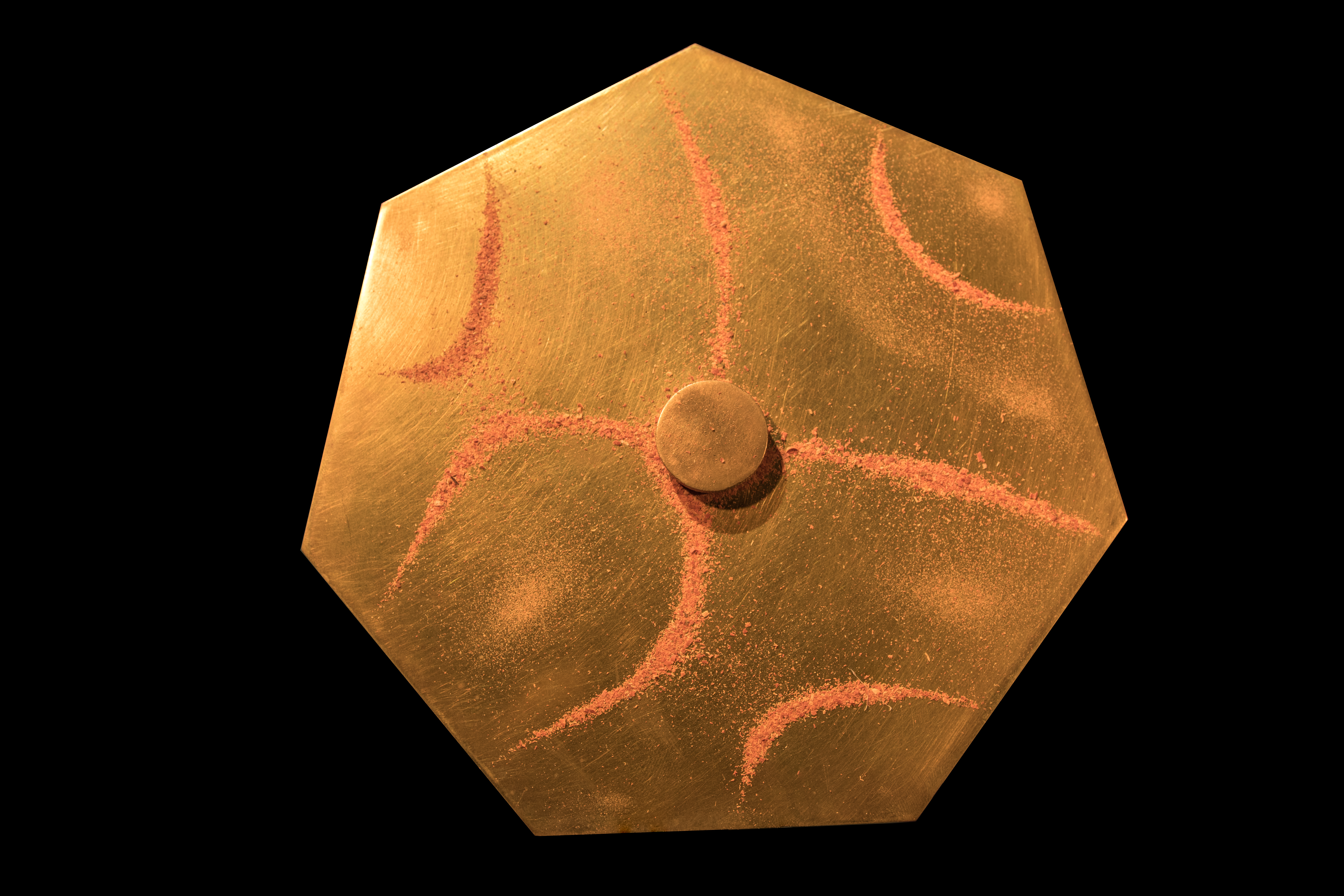
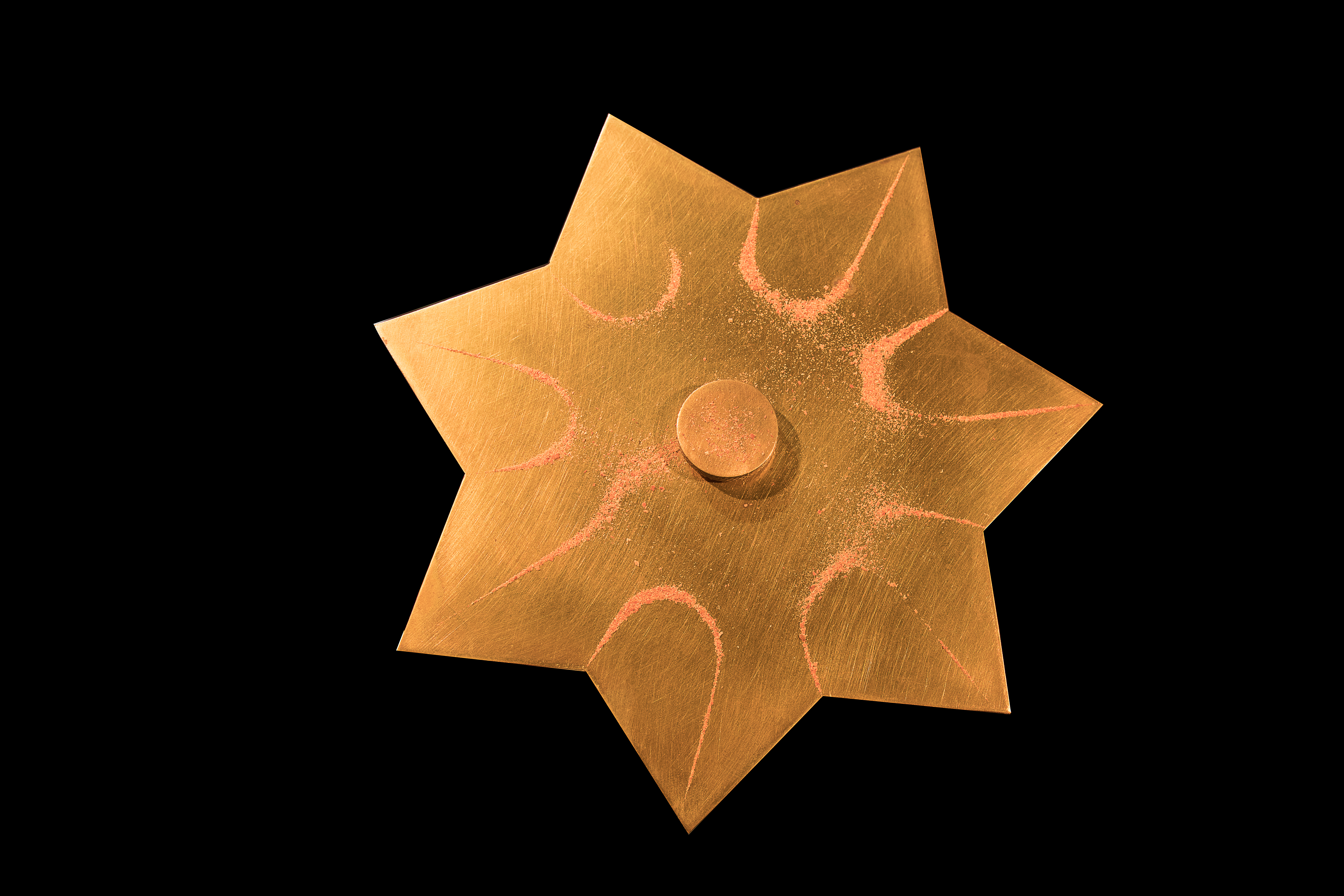
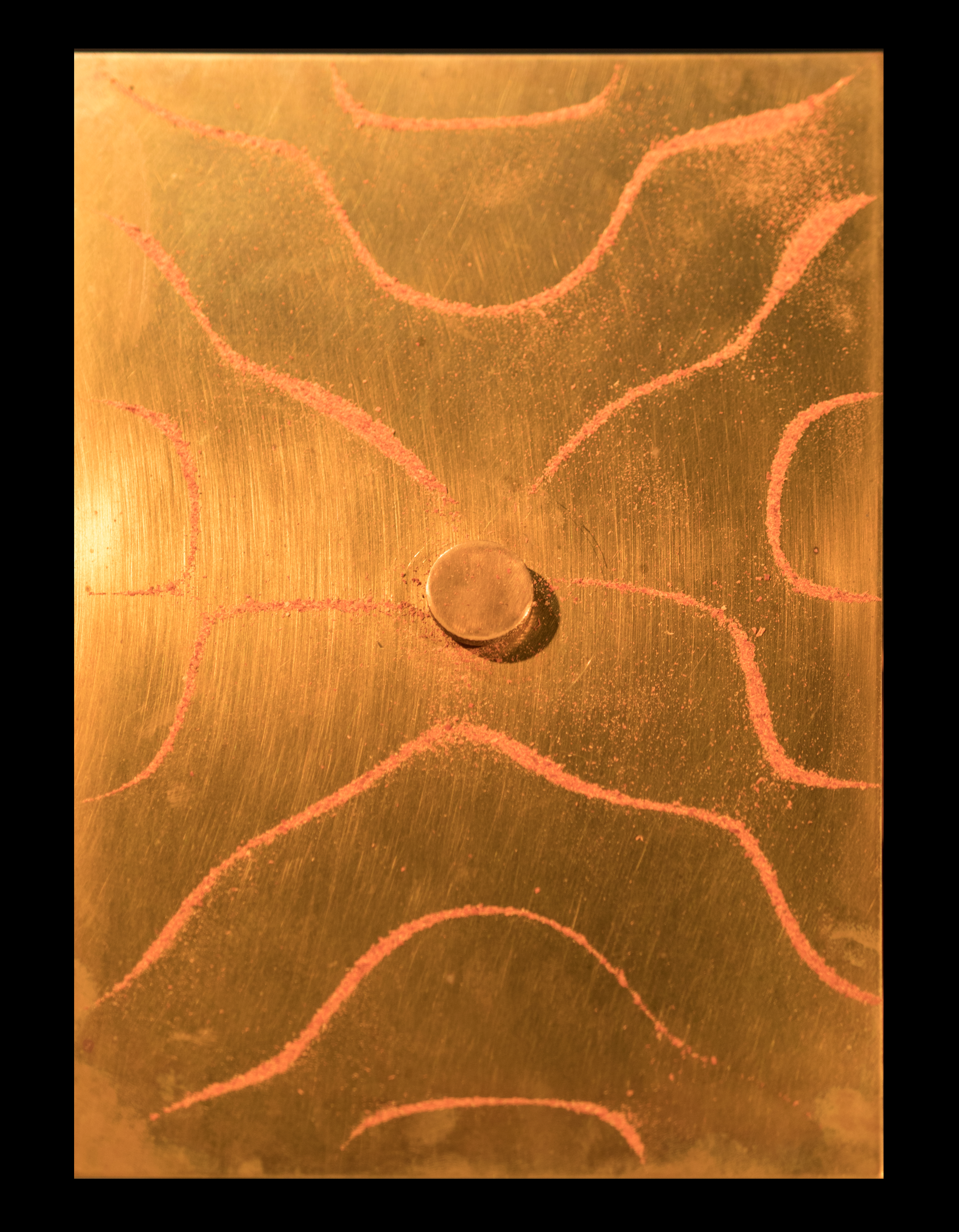
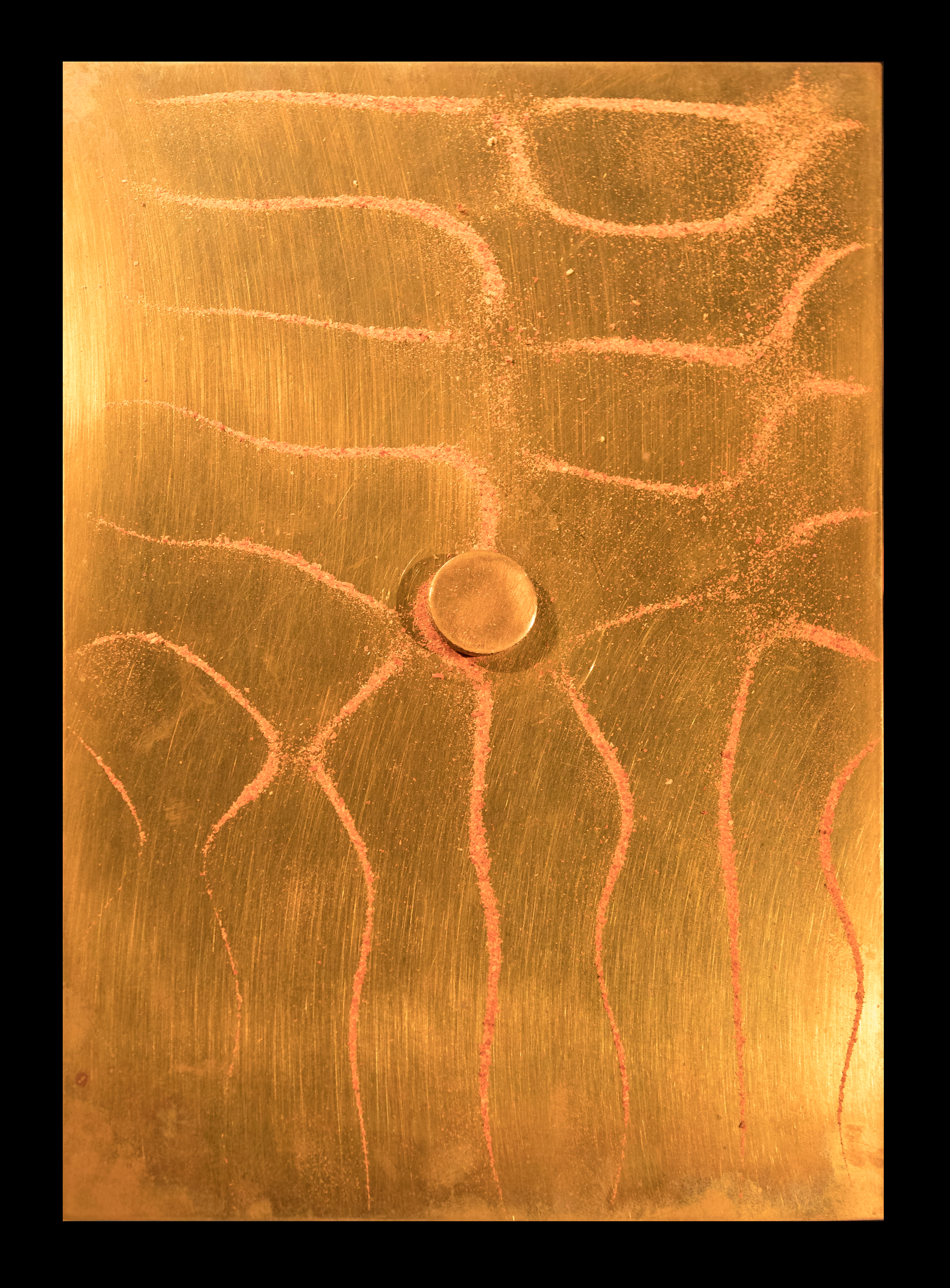
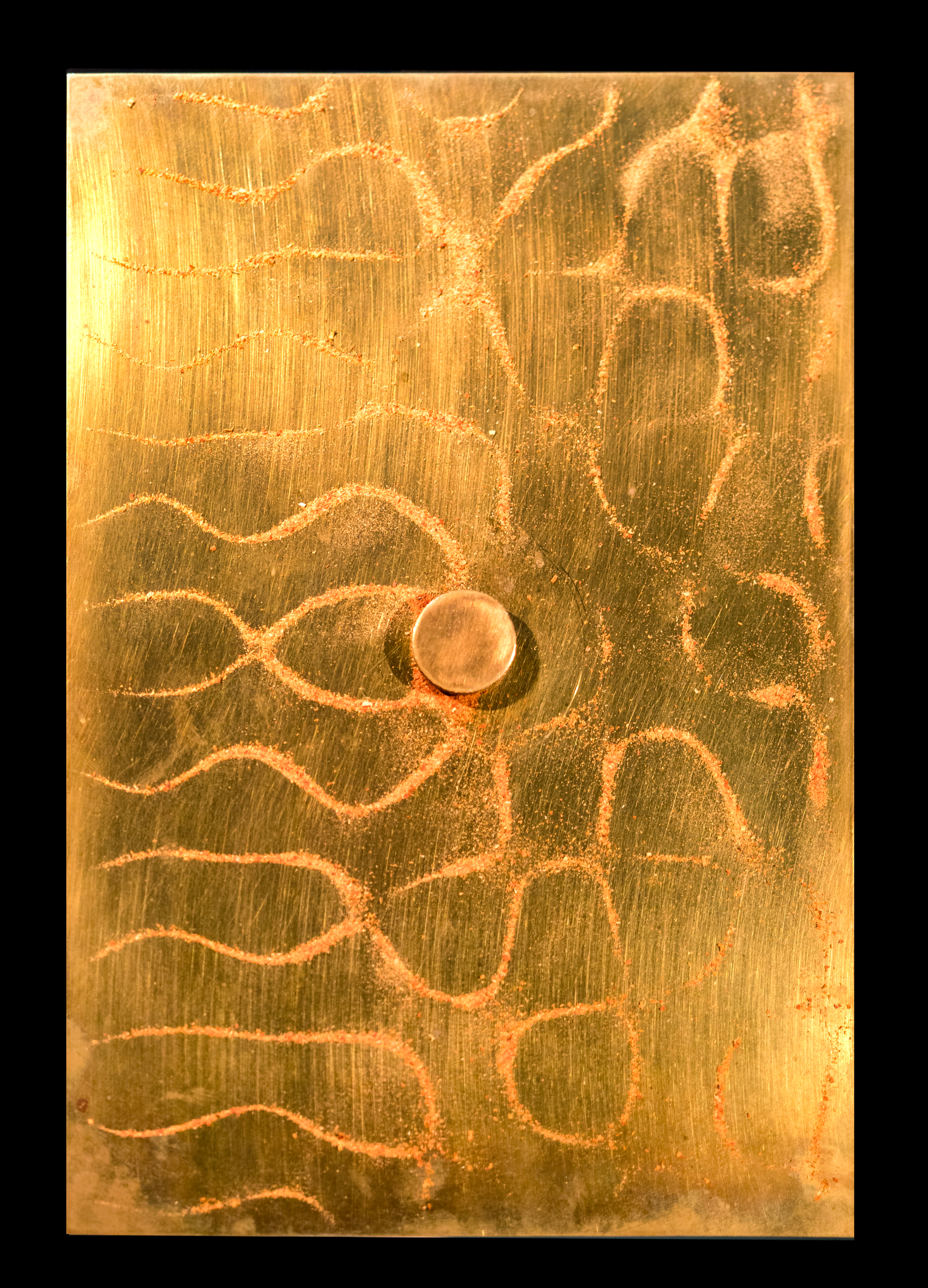
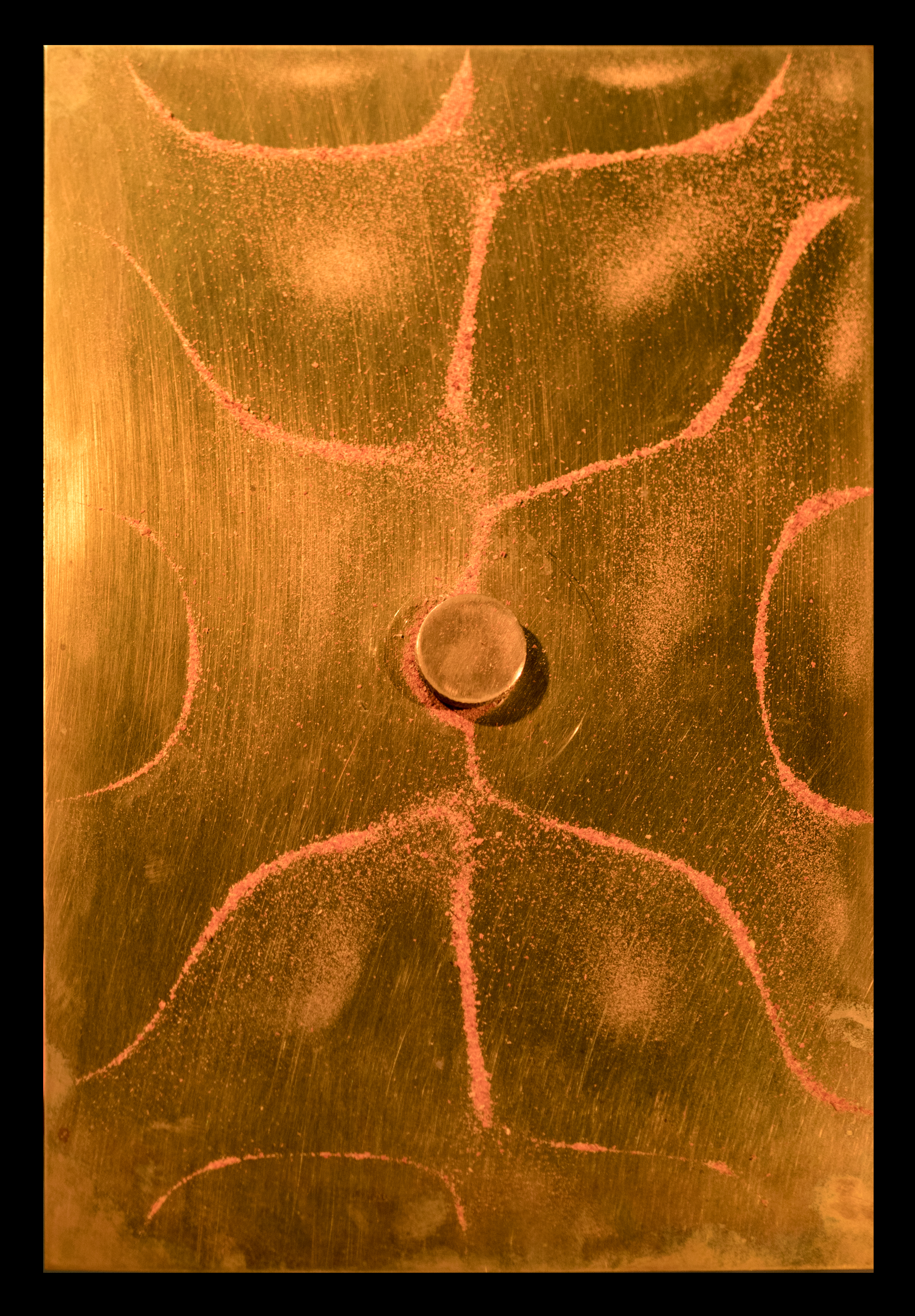

== See also ==
- Alexander Lauterwasser – German researcher and photographer (born 1951)
- Bessel function – Family of solutions to related differential equations
- Hans Jenny (cymatics) – Swiss scientist (1904–1972)
- Tritare – Experimental guitar
- Vibrations of a circular membrane – Equations of waves in a drumhead-like disc
