= Alexander Lauterwasser =

German researcher and photographer (born 1951)

Alexander Lauterwasser (born 1951 in Überlingen) is a German researcher and photographer who based his work on work done by Ernst Chladni and Hans Jenny in the field of Cymatics.

In 2002, Lauterwasser published his book Wasser Klang Bilder (Water Sound Images) with imagery of water surfaces set into motion by sound sources ranging from pure sine waves to music by Ludwig van Beethoven, Karlheinz Stockhausen and even overtone chanting.

In 2006, MACROmedia Publishing published the English version of the Lauterwasser book titled Water Sound Images. It is a 176-page hardcover edition with hundreds of color photos, presenting the art, science and mystical side of Cymatics.

In 2012, Lauterwasser's work was featured in the film Inner Worlds Outer Worlds.
