= Hans Jenny (cymatics) =

Swiss scientist (1904–1972)

Hans Jenny (16 August 1904 in Basel – 23 June 1972 in Dornach) was a Swiss physician and natural scientist who coined the term "cymatics" to describe acoustic effects of sound wave phenomena.

== Life and career ==
Jenny was born in Basel, Switzerland. After completing a doctorate he taught science at the Rudolph Steiner School in Zürich for four years before beginning medical practice.

In 1967, Jenny published the first volume of Cymatics: The Study of Wave Phenomena. The second volume came out in 1972, the year he died. This book was a written and photographic documentation of the effects of sound vibrations on fluids, powders and liquid paste. He concluded, "This is not an unregulated chaos; it is a dynamic but ordered pattern."

Jenny made use of crystal oscillators and his so-called tonoscope to set plates and membranes vibrating. He spread quartz sand onto a black drum membrane 60 cm in diameter. The membrane was caused to vibrate by singing loudly through a cardboard pipe, and the sand produced symmetrical Chladni patterns, named after Ernst Chladni, who had discovered this phenomenon in 1787. Low tones resulted in rather simple and clear pictures, while higher tones formed more complex structures.

== Legacy ==
Chladni's and Jenny's work influenced Alvin Lucier and helped lead to his composition Queen of the South. Cymatics was also followed up by Center for Advanced Visual Studies (CAVS) founder György Kepes at MIT. His work in this area included an acoustically vibrated piece of sheet metal in which small holes had been drilled in a grid. Small flames of gas burned through these holes and thermodynamic patterns were made visible by this setup. A special edition of the Hafler Trio's work Exactly As I Say includes a DVD containing material said to be "based on and extended from techniques suggested by Prof. Hans Jenny". Photographer Alexander Lauterwasser has also captured imagery of water surfaces set into motion by sound sources ranging from sine waves to music by Beethoven, Karlheinz Stockhausen and overtone singing.

== Publications ==
- 1954: Der Typus (The Type) a study in morphology
- 1962: Das Gesetz der Wiederholung (The laws of Repetition)
- 1967: Kymatic (Cymatics) Volume 1
- 1972: Kymatic (Cymatics) Volume 2
