= Index of wave articles =

This is a list of wave topics.

== 0–9 ==
- 21 cm line

== A ==
- Abbe prism
- Absorption spectroscopy
- Absorption spectrum
- Absorption wavemeter
- Acoustic wave
- Acoustic wave equation
- Acoustics
- Acousto-optic effect
- Acousto-optic modulator
- Acousto-optics
- Airy disc
- Airy wave theory
- Alfvén wave
- Alpha waves
- Amphidromic point
- Amplitude
- Amplitude modulation
- Animal echolocation
- Antarctic Circumpolar Wave
- Antiphase
- Aquamarine Power
- Arrayed waveguide grating
- Artificial wave
- Atmospheric diffraction
- Atmospheric wave
- Atmospheric waveguide
- Atom laser
- Atomic clock
- Atomic mirror
- Audience wave
- Autowave
- Averaged Lagrangian

== B ==
- Babinet's principle
- Backward wave oscillator
- Bandwidth-limited pulse
- beat
- Berry phase
- Bessel beam
- Beta wave
- Black hole
- Blazar
- Bloch's theorem
- Blueshift
- Boussinesq approximation (water waves)
- Bow wave
- Bragg diffraction
- Bragg's law
- Breaking wave
- Bremsstrahlung, Electromagnetic radiation
- Brillouin scattering
- Bullet bow shockwave
- Burgers' equation
- Business cycle

== C ==
- Capillary wave
- Carrier wave
- Cherenkov radiation
- Chirp
- Ernst Chladni
- Circular polarization
- Clapotis
- Closed waveguide
- Cnoidal wave
- Coherence (physics)
- Coherence length
- Coherence time
- Cold wave
- Collimated light
- Collimator
- Compton effect
- Comparison of analog and digital recording
- Computation of radiowave attenuation in the atmosphere
- Continuous phase modulation
- Continuous wave
- Convective heat transfer
- Coriolis frequency
- Coronal mass ejection
- Cosmic microwave background radiation
- Coulomb wave function
- Cutoff frequency
- Cutoff wavelength
- Cymatics

== D ==
- Damped wave
- Decollimation
- Delta wave
- Dielectric waveguide
- Diffraction
- Direction finding
- Dispersion (optics)
- Dispersion (water waves)
- Dispersion relation
- Dominant wavelength
- Doppler effect
- Doppler radar
- Douglas Sea Scale
- Draupner wave
- Droplet-shaped wave
- Duhamel's principle

== E ==
- E-skip
- Earthquake
- Echo (phenomenon)
- Echo sounding
- Echolocation (animal)
- Echolocation (human)
- Eddy (fluid dynamics)
- Edge wave
- Eikonal equation
- Ekman layer
- Ekman spiral
- Ekman transport
- El Niño–Southern Oscillation
- Electroencephalography
- Electromagnetic electron wave
- Electromagnetic radiation
- Electromagnetic wave
- Electromagnetic wave cut-off
- Electron
- Elliott wave
- Elliptical polarization
- Emission spectrum
- Envelope (waves)
- Equatorial Rossby wave
- Equatorial waves
- Essential bandwidth
- Evanescent wave
- Extratropical cyclone
- Extremely low frequency

== F ==
- F wave
- Fabry–Pérot interferometer
- Faraday wave
- Fetch (geography)
- Fourier series
- Fraunhofer diffraction
- Fraunhofer distance
- Freak wave
- French New Wave
- Frequency
- Frequency modulation
- Fresnel diffraction
- Fresnel equations
- Fresnel integral
- Fresnel lens
- Fresnel number
- Fresnel rhomb
- Fresnel zone
- Fresnel–Arago laws
- Fundamental frequency

== G ==
- Gamma ray
- Gamma ray burst
- Gamma wave
- Gaussian beam
- Geometric optics, Geometrical optics
- Geostrophic current
- Gravitational radiation
- Gravity wave
- Groundwave
- Group delay
- Group velocity

== H ==
- Harmonic
- Heat wave
- Holography
- Human echolocation
- Hundred-year wave
- Hurricane
- Huygens' principle
- Hydraulic jump
- Hydrography
- Hydropower
- Hyperbolic partial differential equation

== I ==
- In phase
- Inertial wave
- Infragravity wave
- Infrared gas analyzer
- Inhomogeneous electromagnetic wave equation
- Interference (wave propagation)
- Interferometry
- Internal wave
- Inverse scattering transform
- Ion acoustic wave
- Irradiance

== J ==
- Japanese New Wave

== K ==
- Kelvin wave
- Kinematic wave
- Knife-edge effect
- Kondratiev wave

== L ==
- Lamb waves
- Landau damping
- Lee wave
- Linear elasticity
- Linear polarization
- List of New Wave movements
- List of waves named after people
- Long wavelength limit
- Longitudinal mode
- Longitudinal wave
- Longwave
- Love wave

== M ==
- Mach wave
- Mach–Zehnder interferometer
- Maelstrom (disambiguation)
- Magnetometer
- Magnetosonic wave
- Matter wave
- Maxwell's equations
- Mayer waves
- Mechanical wave
- Medical ultrasonography
- Mediumwave
- Megatsunami
- Microbarom
- Microwave
- Microwave auditory effect
- Microwave oven
- Microwave plasma
- Microwaving
- Mie scattering
- Millimeter cloud radar
- Modulation
- Monochromatic electromagnetic plane wave
- Monochromator
- Moonlight
- Morning Glory cloud
- Mu wave
- Multipath propagation

== N ==
- Neural oscillation
- Neutron
- New Wave (competition)
- New Wave (design)
- New Wave (manga)
- New Wave (science fiction)
- New wave music in Yugoslavia
- New wave music
- New wave of American heavy metal
- New wave of British heavy metal
- New wave of traditional heavy metal
- Nondispersive infrared sensor
- Nonlinear Schrödinger equation
- Nonlinear wave
- Nonlinear X-wave
- Normal mode

== O ==
- Ocean surface wave
- One-Way Wave Equation
- Optical fiber
- Optical waveguide
- Oscillon
- Out of phase
- Outgoing longwave radiation
- Overtone
- Oyster wave energy converter

== P ==
- P-wave
- Parabolic reflector
- Periodic function
- Periodic travelling wave
- Phase (waves)
- Phase difference
- Phase modulation
- Phase velocity
- Phonon
- Photon
- Pitch shifter (audio processor)
- Planck constant
- Planck's law
- Plane wave
- Polarization (waves)
- Ponto-geniculo-occipital waves, PGO waves
- Power standing wave ratio
- pp-wave spacetime
- Pressure wave
- Prism
- Proton
- Pulsar
- Pulsar wind nebula
- Pulse wave velocity
- Pulse-density modulation

== Q ==
- QT interval
- quadrature
- Quadrature amplitude modulation
- Quantum optics
- Quantum tunneling
- Quantum Zeno effect

== R ==
- Radar
- Radar astronomy
- Radar cross section
- Radar gun
- Radio propagation
- Radio wave
- Radiosity (heat transfer)
- Rayleigh scattering
- Rayleigh wave
- Rayleigh–Jeans law
- Redshift
- Reflection coefficient
- Reflection seismology
- Refraction
- Relativistic Doppler effect
- Resonance
- Resonator
- Ring laser gyroscope
- Ring modulation
- Ring wave guide
- Rip current
- ripple
- Ripple tank
- Rogue wave (oceanography)
- Rossby wave
- Rossby-gravity waves
- Rydberg constant
- Rydberg formula

== S ==
- S-wave
- Sampling (signal processing)
- Sawtooth wave
- Schrödinger equation
- Sea state
- Seiche
- Seismic wave
- Seismograph
- Seismology
- Sellmeier equation
- Shallow water equations
- Shive wave machine
- Shock wave
- Shortwave radio
- Signal velocity
- Significant wave height
- Sine wave
- Single-sideband modulation
- Sinusoidal plane-wave solutions of the electromagnetic wave equation
- Skywave
- Slow-wave potential
- Slow-wave sleep
- Sneaker wave
- Solitary wave
- Soliton
- Sonar
- Sonic anemometers
- Sound wave
- Spark-gap transmitter
- Spectroscopy
- Speed of gravity
- Speed of light
- Speed of sound
- Spike-and-wave
- Spin wave
- Square wave
- Standing wave
- Standing wave ratio
- Stefan–Boltzmann law
- Stokes drift
- Stokes wave
- Subharmonic
- Super low frequency
- Superharmonic
- Superposition principle
- Supersonic Wave Filter
- Surface acoustic wave
- Surface wave
- Surface wave inversion
- Surface-wave magnitude
- Surface-wave-sustained discharge
- Surfing
- Sverdrup wave
- Swell (ocean)
- Synthetic-aperture radar

== T ==
- T wave
- Terrestrial gamma-ray flash
- Terrestrial stationary waves
- Theta wave
- Tidal bore
- Tidal power
- Tidal resonance
- Tide
- Tired light theory
- Transverse mode
- Transverse wave
- Traveling plane wave
- Traveling wave antenna
- Traveling wave reactor
- Traveling-wave tube
- Triangle wave
- Trigonometric function
- Trojan wave packet
- Tropical wave
- Tsunami
- Turbidity current

== U ==
- Ultra low frequency
- Ultrasound
- Ultraviolet catastrophe
- Undertow (wave action)
- Underwater wave
- Undular bore

== V ==
- Velocity factor
- Vestigial-sideband modulation
- Vibrating string
- Voltage standing wave ratio
- Vortex
- Vorticity

== W ==
- Wake
- Wave (audience)
- Wave base
- Wave disk engine
- Wave drag
- Wave equation
- Wave farm
- Wave field synthesis
- Wave function
- Wave function collapse
- Wave height
- Wave impedance
- Wave loading
- Wave motor
- Wave packet
- Wave period
- Wave plate
- Wave pool
- Wave pounding
- Wave power
- Wave propagation
- Wave shoaling
- Wave surface
- Wave tank
- Wave turbulence
- Wave vector
- Wave velocity
- Wave–current interaction
- Wave-cut platform
- Wave-making resistance
- Waveform
- Waveform monitor
- Wave-formed ripple
- Wavefront
- Wavefunction
- Wavefunction collapse
- Waveguide
- Waveguide (acoustics)
- Waveguide (electromagnetism)
- Waveguide (optics)
- Waveguide flange
- Wavelength
- Wavelength selective switching
- Wavelength-division multiplexing
- Wavelet
- Wavelet transform
- Wavenumber
  - Zonal wavenumber
- Wavenumber-frequency diagram
- Wave–particle duality
- Waverider
- Waves and shallow water
- Waves in plasmas
- Whitham's method
- Wien approximation
- Wien's displacement law
- Wien's law
- Wind wave
- Windsurfing

== X ==
- X-band radar
- X-ray
- X-wave

== Z ==
- Zero-dispersion slope
- Zero-dispersion wavelength
- Zigzag
- Zodiacal light
- Zone plate
