= NLX =

NLX may refer to:

- ISO 639-3 code for the Kalto language
- nanolux, an SI unit of illumination equal to 10^{−9} lux
- NLX (motherboard form factor), a form factor standard for low profile retail PCs
- NLX LLC, a software company acquired by Rockwell Collins in 2003
- Nonlinear X-wave, a multi-dimensional wave that can travel without distortion
- Northern Lights Express, a proposed passenger rail service between Minneapolis and Duluth, Minnesota
- Railroad reporting mark for Allied Corporation from 1963 - 1985
