= Sea =

Large body of salt water

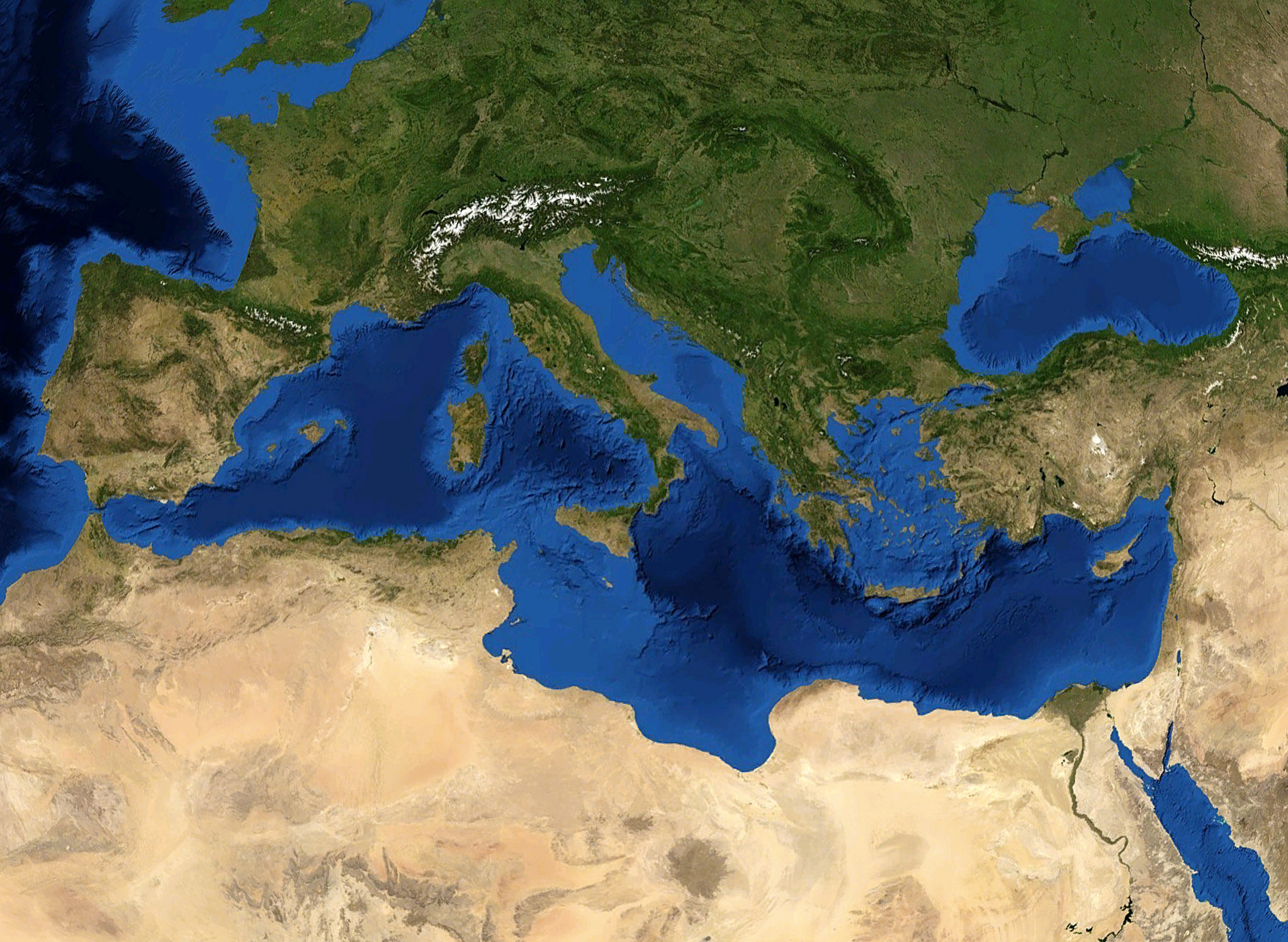
The Mediterranean Sea, an enclosed sea flowing into the Atlantic Ocean

A sea is a very large body of salty water. The term has two distinct meanings. The first is the interconnected body of seawater that spans most of Earth, known as the sea or the ocean. The second is a named body of water: usually either a marginal sea (a second-order section of the oceanic sea such as the Mediterranean Sea), or a large, nearly landlocked body of water.

The salinity of water bodies varies widely, being lower near the surface and the mouths of large rivers and higher in the depths of the ocean; however, the relative proportions of dissolved salts vary little across the oceans. The most abundant solid dissolved in seawater is sodium chloride. The water also contains salts of magnesium, calcium, potassium, and mercury, among other elements, some in minute concentrations. A wide variety of organisms, including bacteria, protists, algae, plants, fungi, and animals live in various marine habitats and ecosystems throughout the seas. These range vertically from the sunlit surface and shoreline to the great depths and pressures of the cold, dark abyssal zone, and in latitude from the cold waters under polar ice caps to the warm waters of coral reefs in tropical regions. Many of the major groups of organisms evolved in the sea and life may have started there.

The ocean moderates Earth's climate and has important roles in the water, carbon, and nitrogen cycles. The surface of the water interacts with the atmosphere, exchanging properties such as particles and temperature, as well as currents. Surface currents are the water currents that are produced by the atmosphere's currents and its winds blowing over the surface of the water, producing wind waves, setting up through drag slow but stable circulations of water, as in the case of the ocean sustaining deep-sea ocean currents. Deep-sea currents, known together as the global conveyor belt, carry cold water from near the poles to every ocean and significantly influence Earth's climate. Tides, the generally twice-daily rise and fall of sea levels, are caused by Earth's rotation and the gravitational effects of the Moon and, to a lesser extent, of the Sun. Tides may have a very high range in bays or estuaries. Submarine earthquakes arising from tectonic plate movements under the oceans can lead to destructive tsunamis, as can volcanoes, huge landslides, or the impact of large meteorites.

The seas have been an integral element for humans throughout history and culture. Humans harnessing and studying the seas have been recorded since ancient times and evidenced well into prehistory, while its modern scientific study is called oceanography and maritime space is governed by the law of the sea, with admiralty law regulating human interactions at sea. The seas provide substantial supplies of food for humans, mainly fish, but also shellfish, mammals and seaweed, whether caught by fishermen or farmed underwater. Other human uses of the seas include trade, travel, mineral extraction, power generation, warfare, and leisure activities such as swimming, sailing, and scuba diving. Many of these activities create marine pollution.

== Definition ==
Oceans and marginal seas as defined by the International Maritime Organization

The sea is the interconnected system of all the Earth's oceanic waters, including the Atlantic, Pacific, Indian, Southern and Arctic Oceans. However, the word "sea" can also be used for many specific, much smaller bodies of seawater, such as the North Sea or the Red Sea. There is no clear distinction between seas and oceans, though generally seas are smaller, and are often partly (as marginal seas or particularly as a mediterranean sea) or wholly (as inland seas) enclosed by land. An exception to this is the Sargasso Sea which has no coastline and lies within a circular current, the North Atlantic Gyre. Seas are generally larger than lakes and contain salt water, but the Sea of Galilee is a freshwater lake. (Note: There is no accepted technical definition of sea amongst oceanographers. One definition is that a sea is a sub-division of an ocean, which means that it must have oceanic basin crust on its floor. This definition accepts the Caspian as a sea because it was once part of an ancient ocean. The Introduction to Marine Biology defines a sea as a "land-locked" body of water, adding that the term "sea" is only one of convenience. The Glossary of Mapping Sciences similarly states that the boundaries between seas and other bodies of water are arbitrary.) The United Nations Convention on the Law of the Sea states that all of the ocean is "sea". (Note: According to this definition, the Caspian would be excluded as it is legally an "international lake".)

== Physical science ==
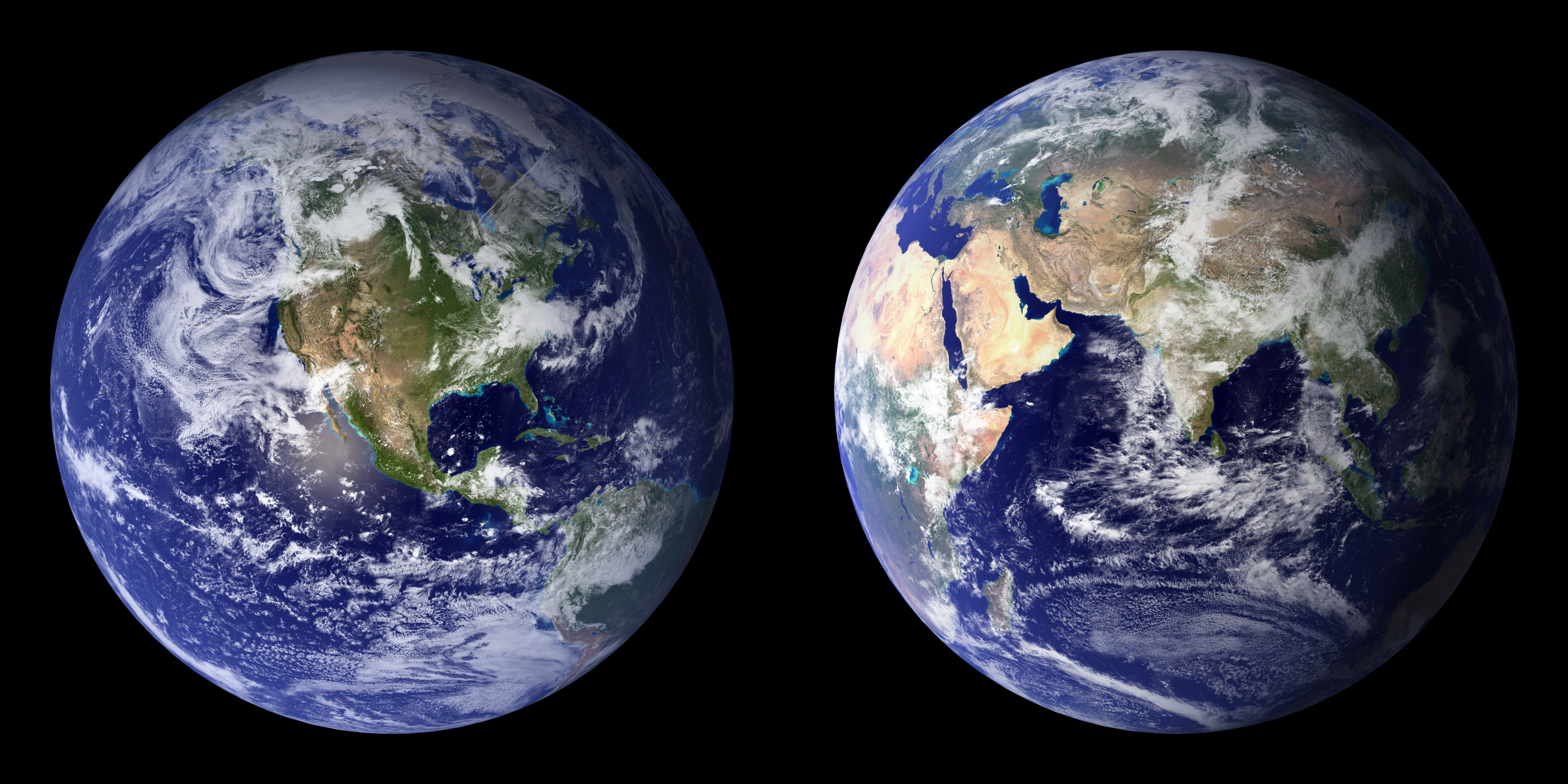
Composite images of the Earth created by NASA in 2001

Earth is the only known planet with seas of liquid water on its surface, although Mars possesses ice caps and similar planets in other solar systems may have oceans. Earth's 1,335,000,000 cubic kilometers (320,000,000 mi^{3}) of sea contain about 97.2 percent of its known water (Note: Hydrous ringwoodite recovered from volcanic eruptions suggests that the transition zone between the lower and upper mantle holds between one and three times as much water as all of the world's surface oceans combined. Experiments to recreate the conditions of the lower mantle suggest it may contain still more water as well, as much as five times the mass of water present in the world's oceans.) and covers approximately 71 percent of its surface. Another 2.15% of Earth's water is frozen, found in the sea ice covering the Arctic Ocean, the ice cap covering Antarctica and its adjacent seas, and various glaciers and surface deposits around the world. The remainder (about 0.65% of the whole) form underground reservoirs or various stages of the water cycle, containing the freshwater encountered and used by most terrestrial life: vapor in the air, the clouds it slowly forms, the rain falling from them, and the lakes and rivers spontaneously formed as its waters flow again and again to the sea.

The scientific study of water and Earth's water cycle is hydrology; hydrodynamics studies the physics of water in motion. The more recent study of the sea in particular is oceanography. This began as the study of the shape of the ocean's currents but has since expanded into a large and multidisciplinary field: it examines the properties of seawater; studies waves, tides, and currents; charts coastlines and maps the seabeds; and studies marine life. The subfield dealing with the sea's motion, its forces, and the forces acting upon it is known as physical oceanography. Marine biology (biological oceanography) studies the plants, animals, and other organisms inhabiting marine ecosystems. Both are informed by chemical oceanography, which studies the behavior of elements and molecules within the oceans: particularly, at the moment, the ocean's role in the carbon cycle and carbon dioxide's role in the increasing acidification of seawater. Marine and maritime geography charts the shape and shaping of the sea, while marine geology (geological oceanography) has provided evidence of continental drift and the composition and structure of the Earth, clarified the process of sedimentation, and assisted the study of volcanism and earthquakes.

=== Seawater ===
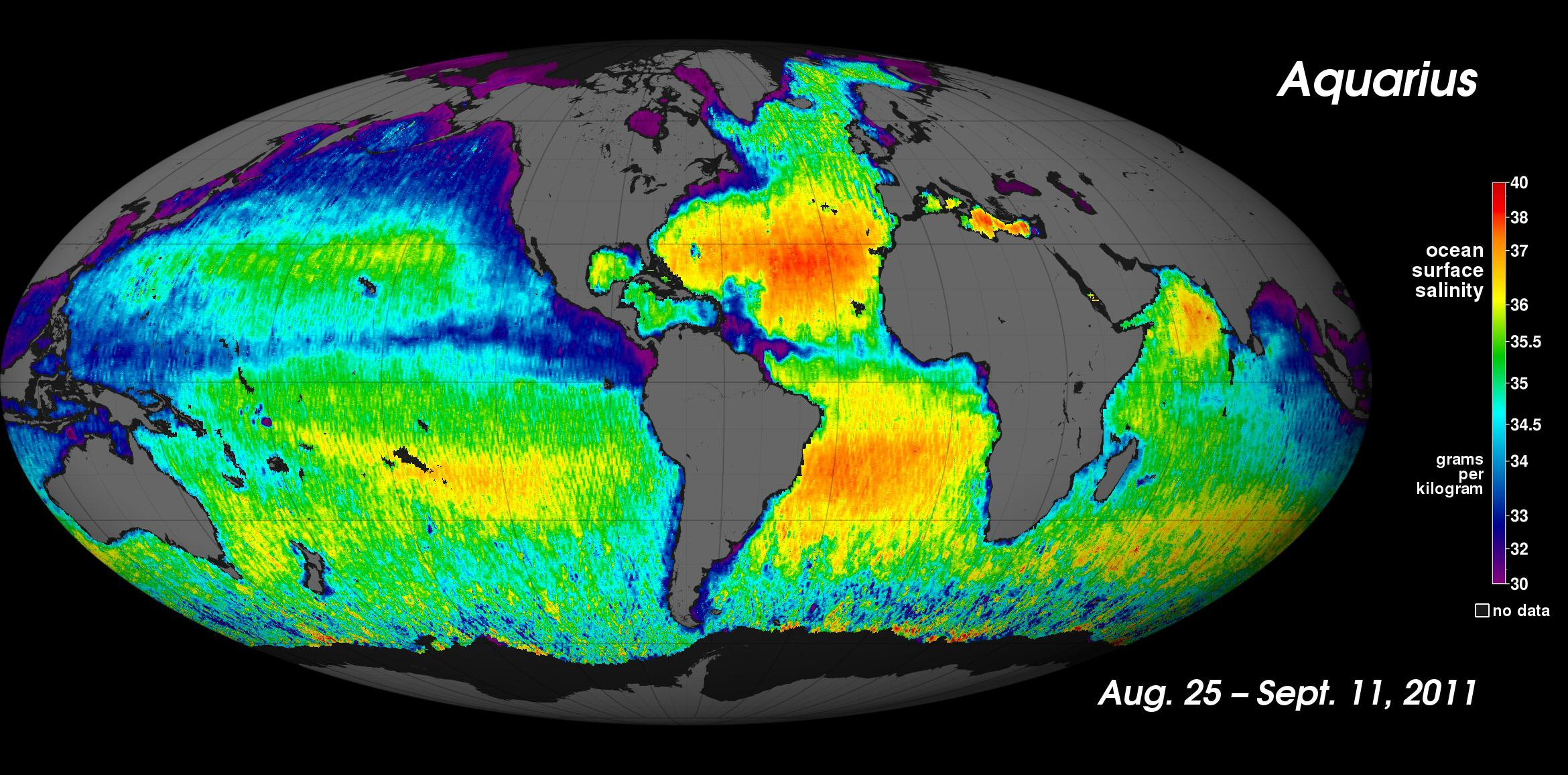
Salinity map taken from the Aquarius Spacecraft. The rainbow colours represent salinity levels: red=40 ‰, purple=30 ‰

==== Salinity ====
A characteristic of seawater is that it is salty. Salinity is usually measured in parts per thousand (‰ or per mil), and the open ocean has about 35 grams (1.2 oz) solids per litre, a salinity of 35 ‰. The Mediterranean Sea is slightly higher at 38 ‰, while the salinity of the northern Red Sea can reach 41‰. In contrast, some landlocked hypersaline lakes have a much higher salinity, for example, the Dead Sea has 300 grams (11 oz) dissolved solids per litre (300 ‰).

While the constituents of table salt (sodium and chloride) make up about 85 percent of the solids in solution, there are also other metal ions such as magnesium and calcium, and negative ions including sulphate, carbonate, and bromide. Despite variations in the levels of salinity in different seas, the relative composition of the dissolved salts is stable throughout the world's oceans. Seawater is too saline for humans to drink safely, as the kidneys cannot excrete urine as salty as seawater.

Major solutes in seawater (3.5% salinity)
Solute	Concentration (‰)	% of total salts
Chloride	19.3	55
Sodium	10.8	30.6
Sulphate	2.7	7.7
Magnesium	1.3	3.7
Calcium	0.41	1.2
Potassium	0.40	1.1
Bicarbonate	0.10	0.4
Bromide	0.07	0.2
Carbonate	0.01	0.05
Strontium	0.01	0.04
Borate	0.01	0.01
Fluoride	0.001	<0.01
All other solutes	<0.001	<0.01

Although the amount of salt in the ocean remains relatively constant within the scale of millions of years, various factors affect the salinity of a body of water. Evaporation and by-product of ice formation (known as "brine rejection") increase salinity, whereas precipitation, sea ice melt, and runoff from land reduce it. The Baltic Sea, for example, has many rivers flowing into it, and thus the sea could be considered as brackish. Meanwhile, the Red Sea is very salty due to its high evaporation rate.

==== Temperature ====
Sea temperature depends on the amount of solar radiation falling on its surface. In the tropics, with the sun nearly overhead, the temperature of the surface layers can rise to over 30 °C (86 °F) while near the poles the temperature in equilibrium with the sea ice is about −2 °C (28 °F). There is a continuous circulation of water in the oceans. Warm surface currents cool as they move away from the tropics, and the water becomes denser and sinks. The cold water moves back towards the equator as a deep sea current, driven by changes in the temperature and density of the water, before eventually welling up again towards the surface. Deep seawater has a temperature between −2 °C (28 °F) and 5 °C (41 °F) in all parts of the globe.

Seawater with a typical salinity of 35 ‰ has a freezing point of about −1.8 °C (28.8 °F). When its temperature becomes low enough, ice crystals form on the surface. These break into small pieces and coalesce into flat discs that form a thick suspension known as frazil. In calm conditions, this freezes into a thin flat sheet known as nilas, which thickens as new ice forms on its underside. In more turbulent seas, frazil crystals join into flat discs known as pancakes. These slide under each other and coalesce to form floes. In the process of freezing, salt water and air are trapped between the ice crystals. Nilas may have a salinity of 12–15 ‰, but by the time the sea ice is one year old, this falls to 4–6 ‰.

==== pH value ====
Seawater is slightly alkaline and had an average pH of about 8.2 over the past 300 million years. More recently, climate change has resulted in an increase of the carbon dioxide content of the atmosphere; about 30–40% of the added CO_{2} is absorbed by the oceans, forming carbonic acid and lowering the pH (now below 8.1) through a process called ocean acidification. The extent of further ocean chemistry changes, including ocean pH, will depend on climate change mitigation efforts taken by nations and their governments.

==== Oxygen concentration ====
The amount of oxygen found in seawater depends primarily on the plants growing in it. These are mainly algae, including phytoplankton, with some vascular plants such as seagrasses. In daylight, the photosynthetic activity of these plants produces oxygen, which dissolves in the seawater and is used by marine animals. At night, photosynthesis stops, and the amount of dissolved oxygen declines. In the deep sea, where insufficient light penetrates for plants to grow, there is very little dissolved oxygen. In its absence, organic material is broken down by anaerobic bacteria producing hydrogen sulphide.

Climate change is likely to reduce levels of oxygen in surface waters since the solubility of oxygen in water falls at higher temperatures. Ocean deoxygenation is projected to increase hypoxia by 10%, and triple suboxic waters (oxygen concentrations 98% less than the mean surface concentrations), for each 1 °C of upper-ocean warming.

==== Light ====
The amount of light that penetrates the sea depends on the angle of the sun, the weather conditions and the turbidity of the water. Much light gets reflected at the surface, and red light gets absorbed in the top few metres. Yellow and green light reach greater depths, and blue and violet light may penetrate as deep as 1,000 metres (3,300 ft). There is insufficient light for photosynthesis and plant growth beyond a depth of about 200 metres (660 ft).

=== Sea level ===
Over most of geologic time, the sea level has been higher than it is today. The main factor affecting sea level over time is the result of changes in the oceanic crust, with a downward trend expected to continue in the very long term. At the Last Glacial Maximum, some 20,000 years ago, the sea level was about 125 metres (410 ft) lower than in present times (2025).

For at least the last 100 years, sea level has been rising at an average rate of about 1.8 millimetres (0.071 in) per year. Most of this rise can be attributed to an increase in the temperature of the sea due to climate change, and the resulting slight thermal expansion of the upper 500 metres (1,600 ft) of water. Additional contributions, as much as one quarter of the total, come from water sources on land, such as melting snow and glaciers and extraction of groundwater for irrigation and other agricultural and human needs.

=== Waves ===
Movement of molecules as waves pass

When the wave enters shallow water, it slows down and its amplitude (height) increases.

Wind blowing over the surface of a body of water forms waves that are perpendicular to the direction of the wind. The friction between air and water caused by a gentle breeze on a pond causes ripples to form. A strong blow over the ocean causes larger waves as the moving air pushes against the raised ridges of water. The waves reach their maximum height when the rate at which they are travelling nearly matches the speed of the wind. In open water, when the wind blows continuously as happens in the Southern Hemisphere in the Roaring Forties, long, organised masses of water called swell roll across the ocean. (Note: "As the waves leave the region where they were generated, the longer ones outpace the shorter because their velocity is greater. Gradually, they fall in with other waves travelling at similar speed – where different waves are in phase they reinforce each other, and where out of phase they are reduced. Eventually, a regular pattern of high and low waves (or swell) is developed that remains constant as it travels out across the ocean.") If the wind dies down, the wave formation is reduced, but already-formed waves continue to travel in their original direction until they meet land. The size of the waves depends on the fetch, the distance that the wind has blown over the water and the strength and duration of that wind. When waves meet others coming from different directions, interference between the two can produce broken, irregular seas. Constructive interference can cause individual (unexpected) rogue waves much higher than normal. Most waves are less than 3 m (10 ft) high and it is not unusual for strong storms to double or triple that height; offshore construction such as wind farms and oil platforms use metocean statistics from measurements in computing the wave forces (due to for instance the hundred-year wave) they are designed against. Rogue waves, however, have been documented at heights above 25 meters (82 ft).

The top of a wave is known as the crest, the lowest point between waves is the trough and the distance between the crests is the wavelength. The wave is pushed across the surface of the sea by the wind, but this represents a transfer of energy and not a horizontal movement of water. As waves approach land and move into shallow water, they change their behavior. If approaching at an angle, waves may bend (refraction) or wrap rocks and headlands (diffraction). When the wave reaches a point where its deepest oscillations of the water contact the seabed, they begin to slow down. This pulls the crests closer together and increases the waves' height, which is called wave shoaling. When the ratio of the wave's height to the water depth increases above a certain limit, it "breaks", toppling over in a mass of foaming water. This rushes in a sheet up the beach before retreating into the sea under the influence of gravity.

=== Tsunami ===
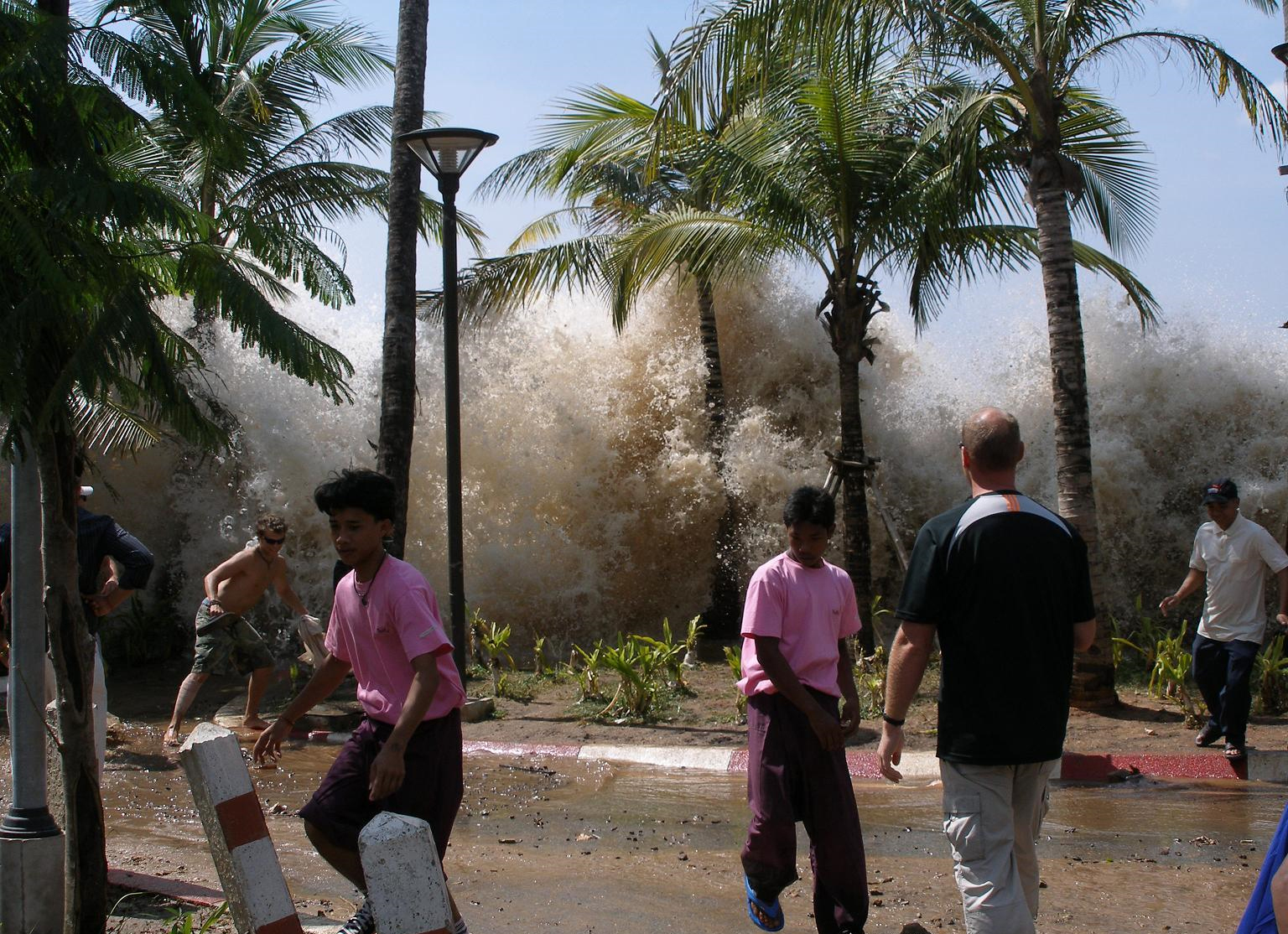
The 2004 Indian Ocean tsunami in Thailand

A tsunami is an unusual form of wave caused by an infrequent powerful event such as an underwater earthquake or landslide, a meteorite impact, a volcanic eruption or a collapse of land into the sea. These events can temporarily lift or lower the surface of the sea in the affected area, usually by a few feet. The potential energy of the displaced seawater is turned into kinetic energy, creating a shallow wave, a tsunami, radiating outwards at a velocity proportional to the square root of the depth of the water and which therefore travels much faster in the open ocean than on a continental shelf. In the deep open sea, tsunamis have wavelengths of around 80 to 300 miles (130 to 480 km), travel at speeds of over 600 miles per hour (970 km/h) and usually have a height of less than three feet, so they often pass unnoticed at this stage. In contrast, ocean surface waves caused by winds have wavelengths of a few hundred feet, travel at up to 65 miles per hour (105 km/h) and are up to 45 feet (14 metres) high.

As a tsunami moves into shallower water its speed decreases, its wavelength shortens and its amplitude increases enormously, behaving in the same way as a wind-generated wave in shallow water but on a vastly greater scale. Either the trough or the crest of a tsunami can arrive at the coast first. In the former case, the sea draws back and leaves subtidal areas close to the shore exposed which provides a useful warning for people on land. When the crest arrives, it does not usually break but rushes inland, flooding all in its path. Much of the destruction may be caused by the flood water draining back into the sea after the tsunami has struck, dragging debris and people with it. Often several tsunami are caused by a single geological event and arrive at intervals of between eight minutes and two hours. The first wave to arrive on shore may not be the biggest or most destructive.

=== Currents ===
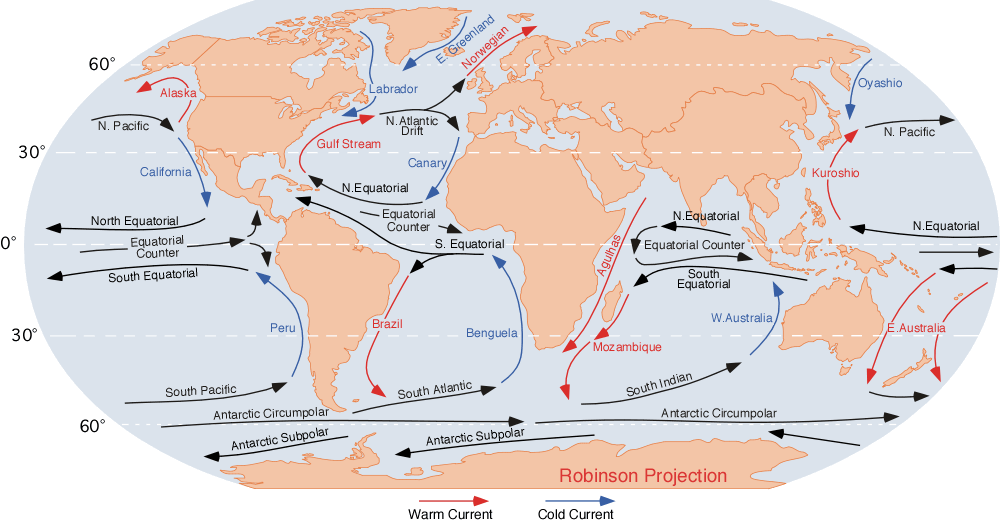
Surface currents: red–warm, blue–cold

Wind blowing over the surface of the sea causes friction at the interface between air and sea. Not only does this cause waves to form, but it also makes the surface seawater move in the same direction as the wind. Although winds are variable, in any one place they predominantly blow from a single direction and thus a surface current can be formed. Westerly winds are most frequent in the mid-latitudes while easterlies dominate the tropics. When water moves in this way, other water flows in to fill the gap and a circular movement of surface currents known as a gyre is formed. There are five main gyres in the world's oceans: two in the Pacific, two in the Atlantic and one in the Indian Ocean. Other smaller gyres are found in lesser seas and a single gyre flows around Antarctica. These gyres have followed the same routes for millennia, guided by the topography of the land, the wind direction and the Coriolis effect. The surface currents flow in a clockwise direction in the Northern Hemisphere and anticlockwise in the Southern Hemisphere. The water moving away from the equator is warm, and that flowing in the reverse direction has lost most of its heat. These currents tend to moderate the Earth's climate, cooling the equatorial region and warming regions at higher latitudes. Global climate and weather forecasts are powerfully affected by the world ocean, so global climate modelling makes use of ocean circulation models as well as models of other major components such as the atmosphere, land surfaces, aerosols and sea ice. Ocean models make use of a branch of physics, geophysical fluid dynamics, that describes the large-scale flow of fluids such as seawater.

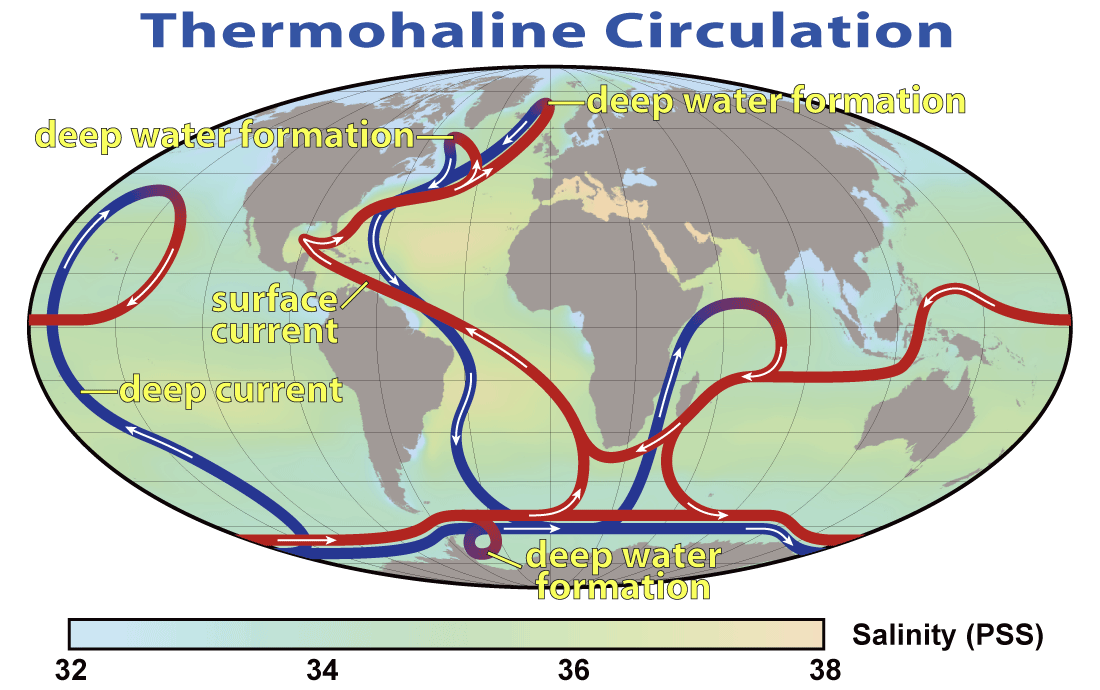
The global conveyor belt shown in blue with warmer surface currents in red

Surface currents only affect the top few hundred metres of the sea, but there are also large-scale flows in the ocean depths caused by the movement of deep water masses. A main deep ocean current flows through all the world's oceans and is known as the thermohaline circulation or global conveyor belt. This movement is slow and is driven by differences in density of the water caused by variations in salinity and temperature. At high latitudes the water is chilled by the low atmospheric temperature and becomes saltier as sea ice crystallizes out. Both these factors make it denser, and the water sinks. From the deep sea near Greenland, such water flows southwards between the continental landmasses on either side of the Atlantic. When it reaches the Antarctic, it is joined by further masses of cold, sinking water and flows eastwards. It then splits into two streams that move northwards into the Indian and Pacific Oceans. Here it is gradually warmed, becomes less dense, rises towards the surface and loops back on itself. It takes a thousand years for this circulation pattern to be completed.

Besides gyres, there are temporary surface currents that occur under specific conditions. When waves meet a shore at an angle, a longshore current is created as water is pushed along parallel to the coastline. The water swirls up onto the beach at right angles to the approaching waves but drains away straight down the slope under the effect of gravity. The larger the breaking waves, the longer the beach and the more oblique the wave approach, the stronger is the longshore current. These currents can shift great volumes of sand or pebbles, create spits and make beaches disappear and water channels silt up. A rip current can occur when water piles up near the shore from advancing waves and is funnelled out to sea through a channel in the seabed. It may occur at a gap in a sandbar or near a man-made structure such as a groyne. These strong currents can have a velocity of 3 ft (0.9 m) per second, can form at different places at different stages of the tide and can carry away unwary bathers. Temporary upwelling currents occur when the wind pushes water away from the land and deeper water rises to replace it. This cold water is often rich in nutrients and creates blooms of phytoplankton and a great increase in the productivity of the sea.

=== Tides ===
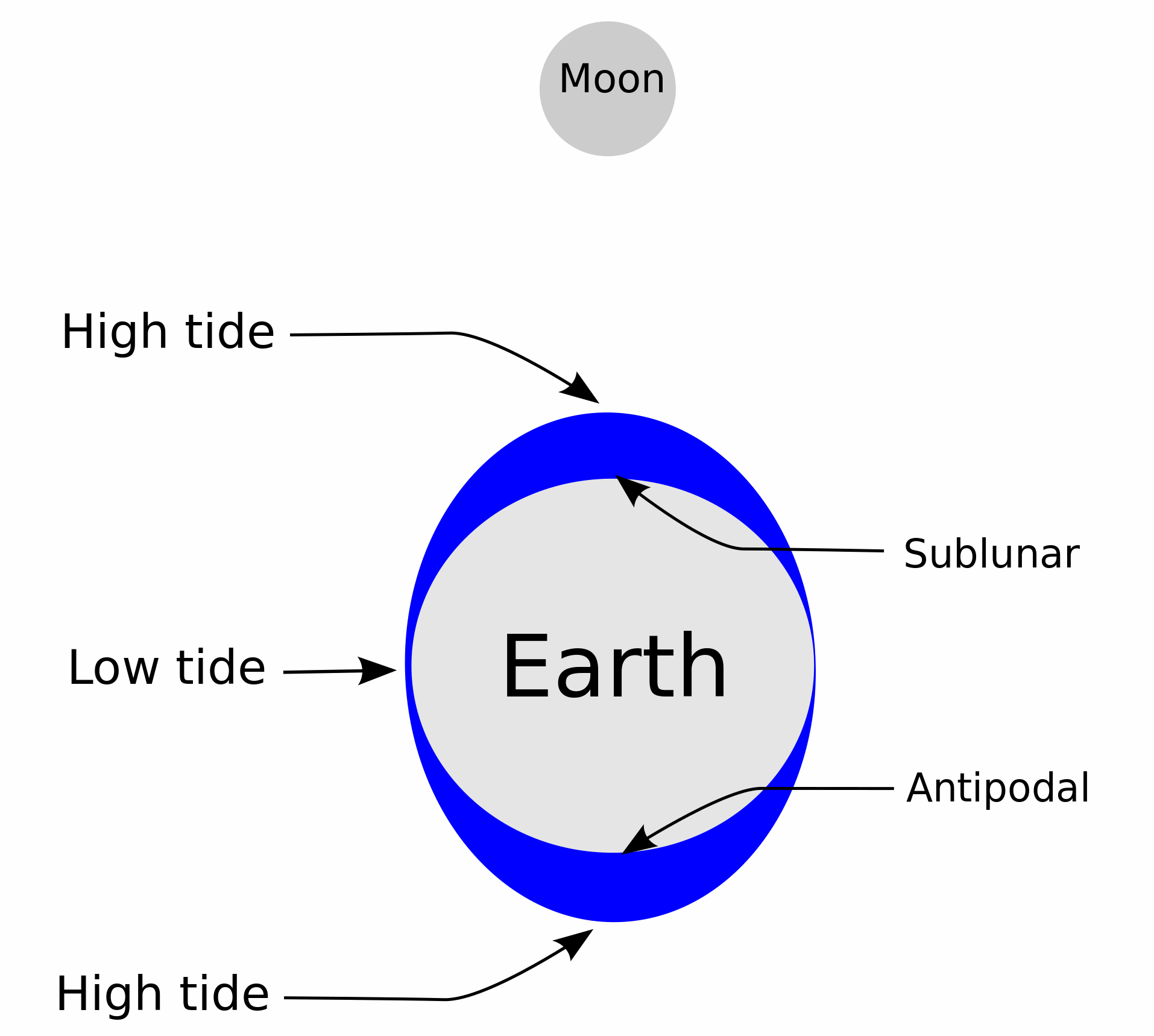
High tides (blue) at the nearest and furthest points of the Earth from the Moon

Tides are the regular rise and fall in water level experienced by seas and oceans in response to the gravitational influences of the Moon and the Sun, and the effects of the Earth's rotation. During each tidal cycle, at any given place the water rises to a maximum height known as "high tide" before ebbing away again to the minimum "low tide" level. As the water recedes, it uncovers more and more of the foreshore, also known as the intertidal zone. The difference in height between the high tide and low tide is known as the tidal range or tidal amplitude.

Most places experience two high tides each day, occurring at intervals of about 12 hours and 25 minutes. This is half the 24 hours and 50 minute period that it takes for the Earth to make a complete revolution and return the Moon to its previous position relative to an observer. The Moon's mass is some 27 million times smaller than the Sun, but it is 400 times closer to the Earth (and the strength of gravity is proportional to the square of the distance between the centres of mass of the objects in question, further compensating for the smaller mass of the Moon). Tidal force or tide-raising force decreases rapidly with distance, so the moon has more than twice as great an effect on tides as the Sun. A bulge is formed in the ocean at the place where the Earth is closest to the Moon because it is also where the effect of the Moon's gravity is stronger. On the opposite side of the Earth, the lunar force is at its weakest and this causes another bulge to form. As the Moon rotates around the Earth, so do these ocean bulges move around the Earth. The gravitational attraction of the Sun is also working on the seas, but its effect on tides is less powerful than that of the Moon, and when the Sun, Moon and Earth are all aligned (full moon and new moon), the combined effect results in the high "spring tides". In contrast, when the Sun is at 90° from the Moon as viewed from Earth, the combined gravitational effect on tides is less causing the lower "neap tides".

A storm surge can occur when high winds pile water up against the coast in a shallow area and this, coupled with a low-pressure system, can raise the surface of the sea at high tide dramatically.

=== Ocean basins ===
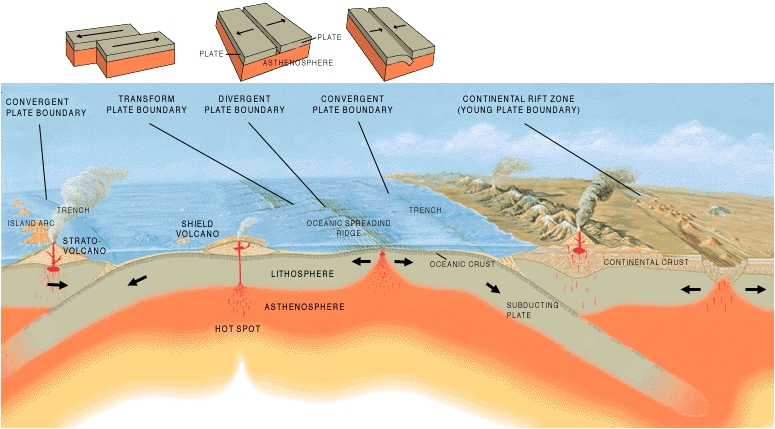
Three types of plate boundary

The Earth is composed of a magnetic central core, a mostly liquid mantle and a hard rigid outer shell (or lithosphere), which is composed of the Earth's rocky crust and the deeper mostly solid outer layer of the mantle. On land the crust is known as the continental crust while under the sea it is known as the oceanic crust. The latter is composed of relatively dense basalt and is some five to ten kilometres (three to six miles) thick. The relatively thin lithosphere floats on the weaker and hotter mantle below and is fractured into a number of tectonic plates. In mid-ocean, magma is constantly being thrust through the seabed between adjoining plates to form mid-oceanic ridges and here convection currents within the mantle tend to drive the two plates apart. Parallel to these ridges and nearer the coasts, one oceanic plate may slide beneath another oceanic plate in a process known as subduction. Deep trenches are formed here and the process is accompanied by friction as the plates grind together. The movement proceeds in jerks which cause earthquakes, heat is produced and magma is forced up creating underwater mountains, some of which may form chains of volcanic islands near to deep trenches. Near some of the boundaries between the land and sea, the slightly denser oceanic plates slide beneath the continental plates and more subduction trenches are formed. As they grate together, the continental plates are deformed and buckle causing mountain building and seismic activity.

The Earth's deepest trench is the Mariana Trench which extends for about 2,500 kilometres (1,600 miles) across the seabed. It is near the Mariana Islands, a volcanic archipelago in the West Pacific. Its deepest point is 10.994 kilometres (nearly 7 miles) below the surface of the sea.

=== Coasts ===
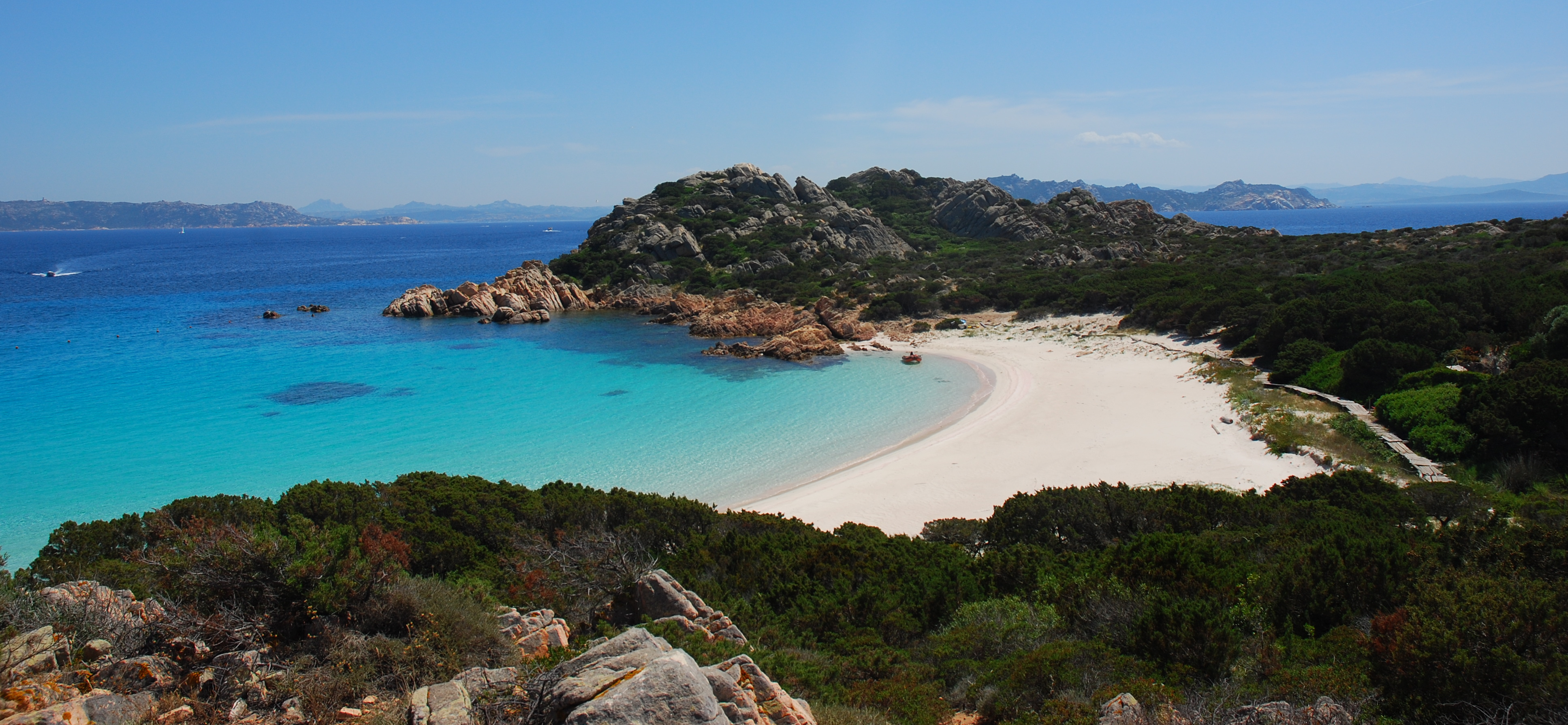
Seaside in Budelli, Italy. Budelli beach is famous for the color of its sand, which is pink due to the presence of fragments of a microorganism called Miniacina miniacea.

The zone where land meets sea is known as the coast and the part between the lowest spring tides and the upper limit reached by splashing waves is the shore. A beach is the accumulation of sand or shingle on the shore. A headland is a point of land jutting out into the sea and a larger promontory is known as a cape. The indentation of a coastline, especially between two headlands, is a bay, a small bay with a narrow inlet is a cove and a large bay may be referred to as a gulf. Coastlines are influenced by several factors including the strength of the waves arriving on the shore, the gradient of the land margin, the composition and hardness of the coastal rock, the inclination of the off-shore slope and the changes of the level of the land due to local uplift or submergence. Normally, waves roll towards the shore at the rate of six to eight per minute and these are known as constructive waves as they tend to move material up the beach and have little erosive effect. Storm waves arrive on shore in rapid succession and are known as destructive waves as the swash moves beach material seawards. Under their influence, the sand and shingle on the beach is ground together and abraded. Around high tide, the power of a storm wave impacting on the foot of a cliff has a shattering effect as air in cracks and crevices is compressed and then expands rapidly with release of pressure. At the same time, sand and pebbles have an erosive effect as they are thrown against the rocks. This tends to undercut the cliff, and normal weathering processes such as the action of frost follows, causing further destruction. Gradually, a wave-cut platform develops at the foot of the cliff and this has a protective effect, reducing further wave-erosion.

Material worn from the margins of the land eventually ends up in the sea. Here it is subject to attrition as currents flowing parallel to the coast scour out channels and transport sand and pebbles away from their place of origin. Sediment carried to the sea by rivers settles on the seabed causing deltas to form in estuaries. All these materials move back and forth under the influence of waves, tides and currents. Dredging removes material and deepens channels but may have unexpected effects elsewhere on the coastline. Governments make efforts to prevent flooding of the land by the building of breakwaters, seawalls, dykes and levees and other sea defences. For instance, the Thames Barrier is designed to protect London from a storm surge, while the failure of the dykes and levees around New Orleans during Hurricane Katrina created a humanitarian crisis in the United States.

=== Water cycle ===
The sea plays a part in the water or hydrological cycle, in which water evaporates from the ocean, travels through the atmosphere as vapour, condenses, falls as rain or snow, thereby sustaining life on land, and largely returns to the sea. Even in the Atacama Desert, where little rain ever falls, dense clouds of fog known as the camanchaca blow in from the sea and support plant life.

In central Asia and other large land masses, there are endorheic basins which have no outlet to the sea, separated from the ocean by mountains or other natural geologic features that prevent the water draining away. The Caspian Sea is the largest one of these. Its main inflow is from the River Volga, there is no outflow and the evaporation of water makes it saline as dissolved minerals accumulate. The Aral Sea in Kazakhstan and Uzbekistan, and Pyramid Lake in the western United States are further examples of large, inland saline water-bodies without drainage. Some endorheic lakes are less salty, but all are sensitive to variations in the quality of the inflowing water.

=== Carbon cycle ===
Oceans contain the greatest quantity of actively cycled carbon in the world and are second only to the lithosphere in the amount of carbon they store. The oceans' surface layer holds large amounts of dissolved organic carbon that is exchanged rapidly with the atmosphere. The deep layer's concentration of dissolved inorganic carbon is about 15 percent higher than that of the surface layer and it remains there for much longer periods of time. Thermohaline circulation exchanges carbon between these two layers.

Carbon enters the ocean as atmospheric carbon dioxide dissolves in the surface layers and is converted into carbonic acid, carbonate, and bicarbonate:

CO_{2} _{(gas)} ⇌ CO_{2} _{(aq)}
CO_{2} _{(aq)} + H_{2}O ⇌ H_{2}CO_{3}
H_{2}CO_{3} ⇌ HCO_{3}^{−} + H^{+}
HCO_{3}^{−} ⇌ CO_{3}^{2−} + H^{+}

It can also enter through rivers as dissolved organic carbon and is converted by photosynthetic organisms into organic carbon. This can either be exchanged throughout the food chain or precipitated into the deeper, more carbon-rich layers as dead soft tissue or in shells and bones as calcium carbonate. It circulates in this layer for long periods of time before either being deposited as sediment or being returned to surface waters through thermohaline circulation.

== Life in the sea ==
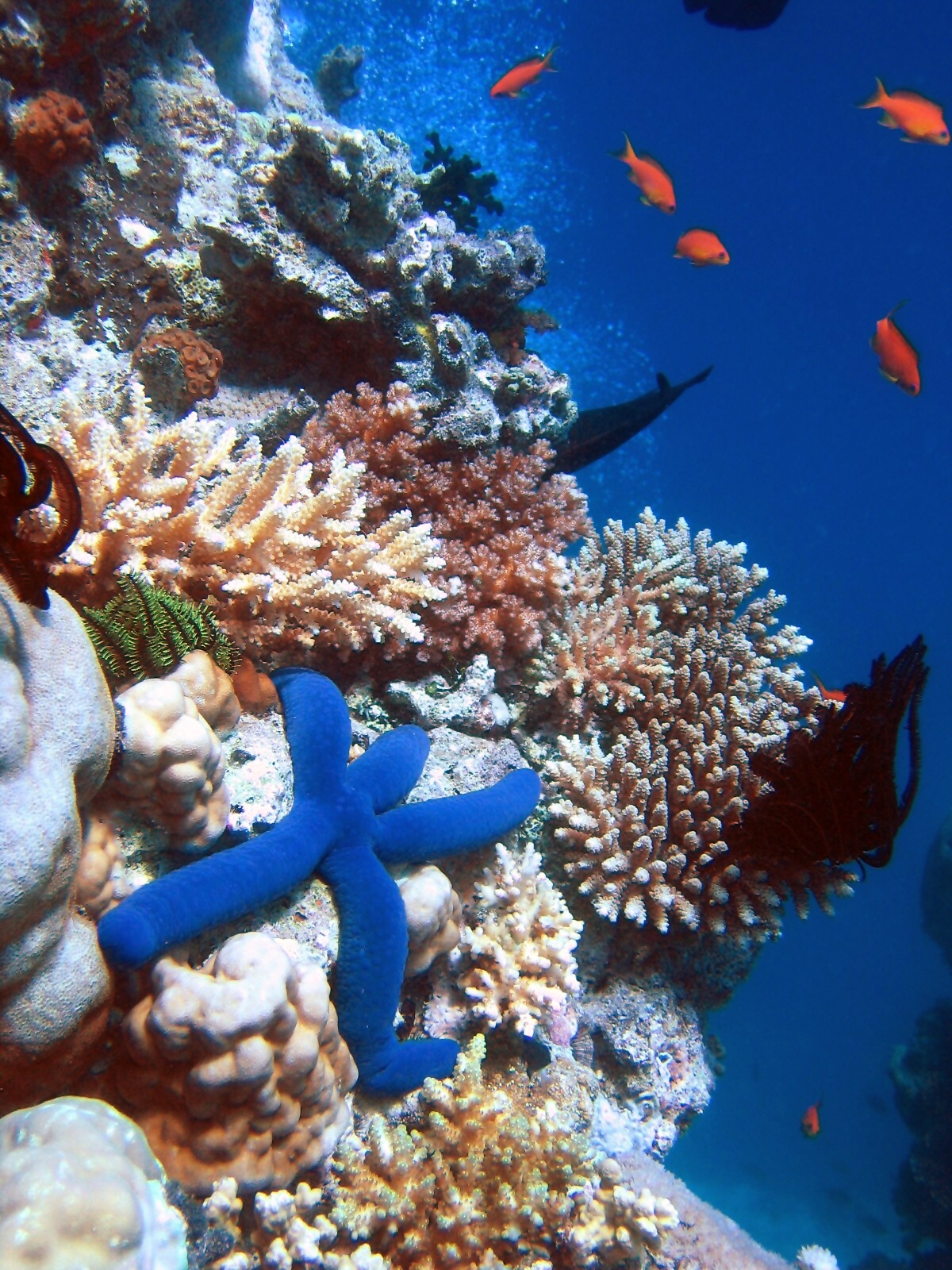
Coral reefs are among the most biodiverse habitats in the world.

The oceans are home to a diverse collection of life forms that use it as a habitat. Since sunlight illuminates only the upper layers, the major part of the ocean exists in permanent darkness. As the different depth and temperature zones each provide habitat for a unique set of species, the marine environment as a whole encompasses an immense diversity of life. Marine habitats range from surface water to the deepest oceanic trenches, including coral reefs, kelp forests, seagrass meadows, tidepools, muddy, sandy and rocky seabeds, and the open pelagic zone. The organisms living in the sea range from whales 30 metres (98 feet) long to microscopic phytoplankton and zooplankton, fungi, and bacteria. Marine life plays an important part in the carbon cycle as photosynthetic organisms convert dissolved carbon dioxide into organic carbon and it is economically important to humans for providing fish for use as food.

Life may have originated in the sea and all the major groups of animals are represented there. Scientists differ as to precisely where in the sea life arose: the Miller-Urey experiments suggested a dilute chemical "soup" in open water, but more recent suggestions include volcanic hot springs, fine-grained clay sediments, or deep-sea "black smoker" vents, all of which would have provided protection from damaging ultraviolet radiation which was not blocked by the early Earth's atmosphere.

=== Marine habitats ===
Marine habitats can be divided horizontally into coastal and open ocean habitats. Coastal habitats extend from the shoreline to the edge of the continental shelf. Most marine life is found in coastal habitats, even though the shelf area occupies only 7 percent of the total ocean area. Open ocean habitats are found in the deep ocean beyond the edge of the continental shelf. Alternatively, marine habitats can be divided vertically into pelagic (open water), demersal (just above the seabed) and benthic (sea bottom) habitats. A third division is by latitude: from polar seas with ice shelves, sea ice and icebergs, to temperate and tropical waters.

Coral reefs, the so-called "rainforests of the sea", occupy less than 0.1 percent of the world's ocean surface, yet their ecosystems include 25 percent of all marine species. The best-known are tropical coral reefs such as Australia's Great Barrier Reef, but cold water reefs harbour a wide array of species including corals (only six of which contribute to reef formation).

=== Algae and plants ===
Marine primary producers – plants and microscopic organisms in the plankton – are widespread and very essential for the ecosystem. It has been estimated that half of the world's oxygen is produced by phytoplankton. About 45 percent of the sea's primary production of living material is contributed by diatoms. Much larger algae, commonly known as seaweeds, are important locally; Sargassum forms floating drifts, while kelp form seabed forests. Flowering plants in the form of seagrasses grow in "meadows" in sandy shallows, mangroves line the coast in tropical and subtropical regions and salt-tolerant plants thrive in regularly inundated salt marshes. All of these habitats are able to sequester large quantities of carbon and support a biodiverse range of larger and smaller animal life.

Light is only able to penetrate the top 200 metres (660 ft) so this is the only part of the sea where plants can grow. The surface layers are often deficient in biologically active nitrogen compounds. The marine nitrogen cycle consists of complex microbial transformations which include the fixation of nitrogen, its assimilation, nitrification, anammox and denitrification. Some of these processes take place in deep water so that where there is an upwelling of cold waters, and also near estuaries where land-sourced nutrients are present, plant growth is higher. This means that the most productive areas, rich in plankton and therefore also in fish, are mainly coastal.

=== Animals and other marine life ===
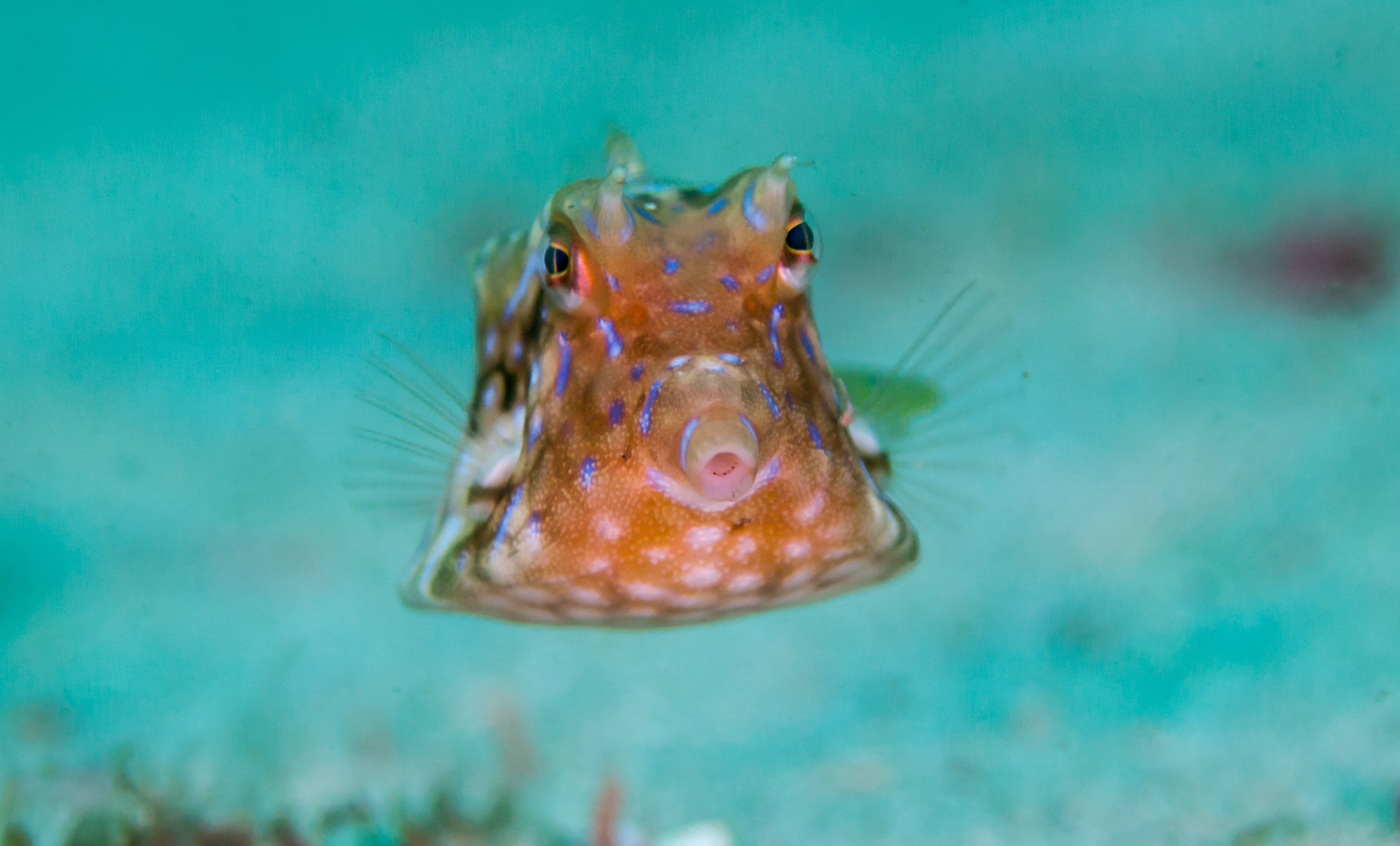
A thornback cowfish

Killer Whale Orcinus orca

There is a wide spectrum of animal taxa in the sea; many marine species have yet to be discovered and the number known to science is increasing annually. Some vertebrates such as seabirds, seals and sea turtles return to the land to breed but fish, cetaceans and sea snakes have a completely aquatic lifestyle and many invertebrate phyla are entirely marine. In fact, the oceans teem with life and provide many varying microhabitats. One of these is the surface film which, even though tossed about by the movement of waves, provides a rich environment and is home to bacteria, fungi, microalgae, protozoa, fish eggs and various larvae.

The pelagic zone contains macro- and microfauna and myriad zooplankton which drift with the currents. Most of the smallest organisms are the larvae of fish and marine invertebrates which liberate eggs in vast numbers because the chance of any one embryo surviving to maturity is so minute. The zooplankton feed on phytoplankton and on each other and form a basic part of the complex food chain that extends through variously sized fish and other nektonic organisms to large squid, sharks, porpoises, dolphins and whales. Some marine creatures make large migrations, either to other regions of the ocean on a seasonal basis or vertical migrations daily, often ascending to feed at night and descending to safety by day. Ships can introduce or spread invasive species through the discharge of ballast water or the transport of organisms that have accumulated as part of the fouling community on the hulls of vessels.

The demersal zone supports many animals that feed on benthic organisms or seek protection from predators and the seabed provides a range of habitats on or under the surface of the substrate which are used by creatures adapted to these conditions. The tidal zone with its periodic exposure to the dehydrating air is home to barnacles, molluscs and crustaceans. The neritic zone has many organisms that need light to flourish. Here, among algal-encrusted rocks live sponges, echinoderms, polychaete worms, sea anemones and other invertebrates. Corals often contain photosynthetic symbionts and live in shallow waters where light penetrates. The extensive calcareous skeletons they extrude build up into coral reefs which are an important feature of the seabed. These provide a biodiverse habitat for reef-dwelling organisms. There is less sea life on the floor of deeper seas but marine life also flourishes around seamounts that rise from the depths, where fish and other animals congregate to spawn and feed. Close to the seabed live demersal fish that feed largely on pelagic organisms or benthic invertebrates. Exploration of the deep sea by submersibles revealed a new world of creatures living on the seabed that scientists had not previously known to exist. Some like the detrivores rely on organic material falling to the ocean floor. Others cluster round deep sea hydrothermal vents where mineral-rich flows of water emerge from the seabed, supporting communities whose primary producers are sulphide-oxidising chemoautotrophic bacteria, and whose consumers include specialised bivalves, sea anemones, barnacles, crabs, worms and fish, often found nowhere else. A dead whale sinking to the bottom of the ocean provides food for an assembly of organisms which similarly rely largely on the actions of sulphur-reducing bacteria. Such places support unique biomes where many new microbes and other lifeforms have been discovered.

== Humans and the sea ==
=== History of navigation and exploration ===
Map showing the seaborne migration and expansion of the Austronesians beginning at around 3000 BC

Humans have travelled the seas since they first built sea-going craft. Mesopotamians were using bitumen to caulk their reed boats and, a little later, masted sails. By c. 3000 BC, Austronesians on Taiwan had begun spreading into maritime Southeast Asia. Subsequently, the Austronesian "Lapita" peoples displayed great feats of navigation, reaching out from the Bismarck Archipelago to as far away as Fiji, Tonga, and Samoa. Their descendants continued to travel thousands of miles between tiny islands on outrigger canoes, and in the process they found many new islands, including Hawaii, Easter Island (Rapa Nui), and New Zealand.

The Ancient Egyptians and Phoenicians explored the Mediterranean and Red Sea with the Egyptian Hannu reaching the Arabian Peninsula and the African Coast around 2750 BC. In the first millennium BC, Phoenicians and Greeks established colonies throughout the Mediterranean and the Black Sea. Around 500 BC, the Carthaginian navigator Hanno left a detailed periplus of an Atlantic journey that reached at least Senegal and possibly Mount Cameroon. In the early Medieval period, the Vikings crossed the North Atlantic and even reached the northeastern fringes of North America. Novgorodians had also been sailing the White Sea since the 13th century or before. Meanwhile, the seas along the eastern and southern Asian coast were used by Arab and Chinese traders. The Chinese Ming Dynasty had a fleet of 317 ships with 37,000 men under Zheng He in the early fifteenth century, sailing the Indian and Pacific Oceans. In the late fifteenth century, Western European mariners started making longer voyages of exploration in search of trade. Bartolomeu Dias rounded the Cape of Good Hope in 1487 and Vasco da Gama reached India via the Cape in 1498. Christopher Columbus sailed from Cádiz in 1492, attempting to reach the eastern lands of India and Japan by the novel means of travelling westwards. He made landfall instead on an island in the Caribbean Sea and a few years later, the Venetian navigator John Cabot reached Newfoundland. The Italian Amerigo Vespucci, after whom America was named, explored the South American coastline in voyages made between 1497 and 1502, discovering the mouth of the Amazon River. In 1519 the Portuguese navigator Ferdinand Magellan led the Spanish Magellan-Elcano expedition which would be the first to sail around the world.

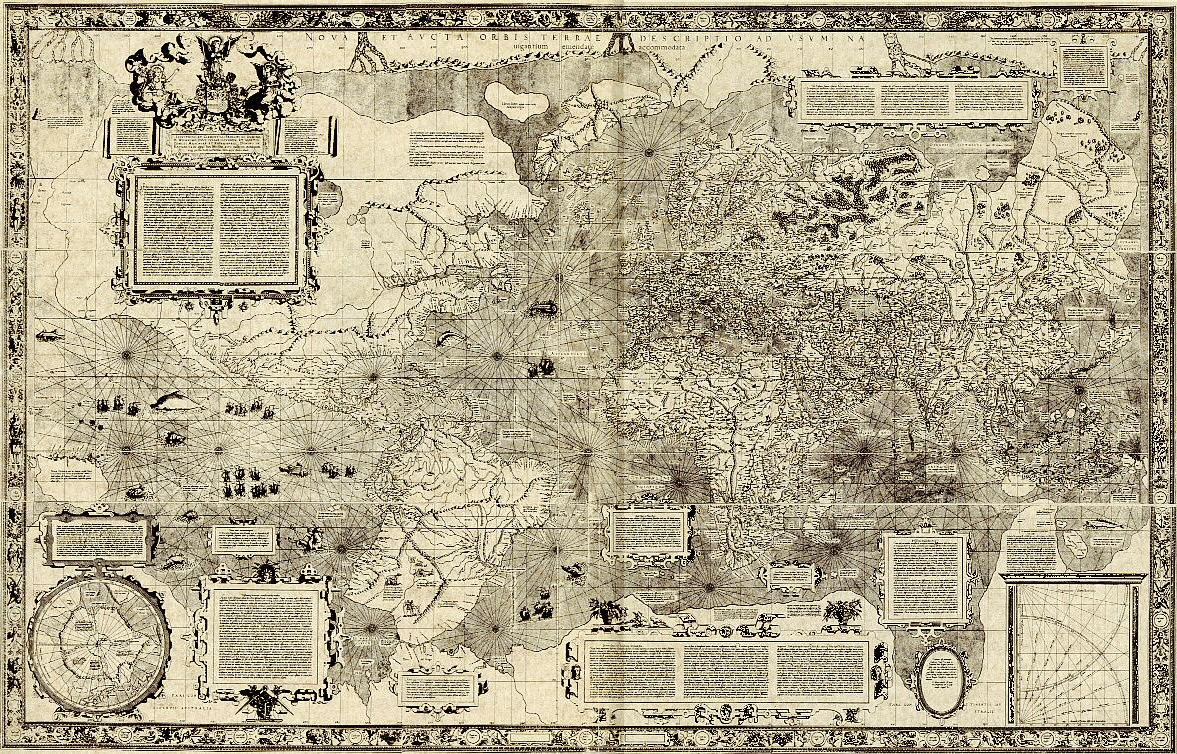
Gerardus Mercator's 1569 world map. The coastline of the old world is quite accurately depicted, unlike that of the Americas. Regions in high latitudes (Arctic, Antarctic) are greatly enlarged on this projection.

As for the history of navigational instrument, a compass was first used by the ancient Greeks and Chinese to show where north lies and the direction in which the ship is heading. The latitude (an angle which ranges from 0° at the equator to 90° at the poles) was determined by measuring the angle between the Sun, Moon or a specific star and the horizon by the use of an astrolabe, Jacob's staff or sextant. The longitude (a line on the globe joining the two poles) could only be calculated with an accurate chronometer to show the exact time difference between the ship and a fixed point such as the Greenwich Meridian. In 1759, John Harrison, a clockmaker, designed such an instrument and James Cook used it in his voyages of exploration. Nowadays, the Global Positioning System (GPS) using over thirty satellites enables accurate navigation worldwide.

With regards to maps that are vital for navigation, in the second century, Ptolemy mapped the whole known world from the "Fortunatae Insulae", Cape Verde or Canary Islands, eastward to the Gulf of Thailand. This map was used in 1492 when Christopher Columbus set out on his voyages of discovery. Subsequently, Gerardus Mercator made a practical map of the world in 1538, his map projection conveniently making rhumb lines straight. By the eighteenth century better maps had been made and part of the objective of James Cook on his voyages was to further map the ocean. Scientific study has continued with the depth recordings of the Tuscarora, the oceanic research of the Challenger voyages (1872–1876), the work of the Scandinavian seamen Roald Amundsen and Fridtjof Nansen, the Michael Sars expedition in 1910, the German Meteor expedition of 1925, the Antarctic survey work of Discovery II in 1932, and others since. Furthermore, in 1921, the International Hydrographic Organization (IHO) was set up, and it constitutes the world authority on hydrographic surveying and nautical charting. A fourth edition draft was published in 1986 but so far several naming disputes (such as the one over the Sea of Japan) have prevented its ratification.

=== History of oceanography and deep sea exploration ===
Scientific oceanography began with the voyages of Captain James Cook from 1768 to 1779, describing the Pacific with unprecedented precision from 71 degrees South to 71 degrees North. John Harrison's chronometers supported Cook's accurate navigation and charting on two of these voyages, permanently improving the standard attainable for subsequent work. Other expeditions followed in the nineteenth century, from Russia, France, the Netherlands and the United States as well as Britain. On HMS Beagle, which provided Charles Darwin with ideas and materials for his 1859 book On the Origin of Species, the ship's captain, Robert FitzRoy, charted the seas and coasts and published his four-volume report of the ship's three voyages in 1839. Edward Forbes's 1854 book, Distribution of Marine Life argued that no life could exist below around 600 metres (2,000 feet). This was proven wrong by the British biologists W. B. Carpenter and C. Wyville Thomson, who in 1868 discovered life in deep water by dredging. Wyville Thompson became chief scientist on the Challenger expedition of 1872–1876, which effectively created the science of oceanography.

On her 68,890-nautical-mile (127,580 km) journey round the globe, HMS Challenger discovered about 4,700 new marine species, and made 492 deep sea soundings, 133 bottom dredges, 151 open water trawls and 263 serial water temperature observations. In the southern Atlantic in 1898/1899, Carl Chun on the Valdivia brought many new life forms to the surface from depths of over 4,000 metres (13,000 ft). The first observations of deep-sea animals in their natural environment were made in 1930 by William Beebe and Otis Barton who descended to 434 metres (1,424 ft) in the spherical steel Bathysphere. This was lowered by cable but by 1960 a self-powered submersible, Trieste developed by Jacques Piccard, took Piccard and Don Walsh to the deepest part of the Earth's oceans, the Mariana Trench in the Pacific, reaching a record depth of about 10,915 metres (35,810 ft), a feat not repeated until 2012 when James Cameron piloted the Deepsea Challenger to similar depths. An atmospheric diving suit can be worn for deep sea operations, with a new world record being set in 2006 when a US Navy diver descended to 2,000 feet (610 m) in one of these articulated, pressurized suits.

At great depths, no light penetrates through the water layers from above and the pressure is extreme. For deep sea exploration it is necessary to use specialist vehicles, either remotely operated underwater vehicles with lights and cameras or crewed submersibles. The battery-operated Mir submersibles have a three-person crew and can descend to 20,000 feet (6,100 m). They have viewing ports, 5,000-watt lights, video equipment and manipulator arms for collecting samples, placing probes or pushing the vehicle across the sea bed when the thrusters would stir up excessive sediment.

Bathymetry is the mapping and study of the topography of the ocean floor. Methods used for measuring the depth of the sea include single or multibeam echosounders, laser airborne depth sounders and the calculation of depths from satellite remote sensing data. This information is used for determining the routes of undersea cables and pipelines, for choosing suitable locations for siting oil rigs and offshore wind turbines and for identifying possible new fisheries.

Ongoing oceanographic research includes marine lifeforms, conservation, the marine environment, the chemistry of the ocean, the studying and modelling of climate dynamics, the air-sea boundary, weather patterns, ocean resources, renewable energy, waves and currents, and the design and development of new tools and technologies for investigating the deep. Whereas in the 1960s and 1970s, research could focus on taxonomy and basic biology, in the 2010s, attention has shifted to larger topics such as climate change. Researchers make use of satellite-based remote sensing for surface waters, with research ships, moored observatories and autonomous underwater vehicles to study and monitor all parts of the sea.

=== Law ===
"Freedom of the seas" is a principle in international law dating from the seventeenth century. It stresses freedom to navigate the oceans and disapproves of war fought in international waters. Today, this concept is enshrined in the United Nations Convention on the Law of the Sea (UNCLOS), the third version of which came into force in 1994. Article 87(1) states: "The high seas are open to all states, whether coastal or land-locked." Article 87(1) (a) to (f) gives a non-exhaustive list of freedoms including navigation, overflight, the laying of submarine cables, building artificial islands, fishing and scientific research. The safety of shipping is regulated by the International Maritime Organization. Its objectives include developing and maintaining a regulatory framework for shipping, maritime safety, environmental concerns, legal matters, technical co-operation and maritime security.

UNCLOS defines various areas of water. "Internal waters" are on the landward side of a baseline and foreign vessels have no right of passage in these. "Territorial waters" extend to 12 nautical miles (22 kilometres; 14 miles) from the coastline and in these waters, the coastal state is free to set laws, regulate use and exploit any resource. A "contiguous zone" extending a further 12 nautical miles allows for hot pursuit of vessels suspected of infringing laws in four specific areas: customs, taxation, immigration and pollution. An "exclusive economic zone" extends for 200 nautical miles (370 kilometres; 230 miles) from the baseline. Within this area, the coastal nation has sole exploitation rights over all natural resources. The "continental shelf" is the natural prolongation of the land territory to the continental margin's outer edge, or 200 nautical miles from the coastal state's baseline, whichever is greater. Here the coastal nation has the exclusive right to harvest minerals and also living resources "attached" to the seabed.

=== War ===
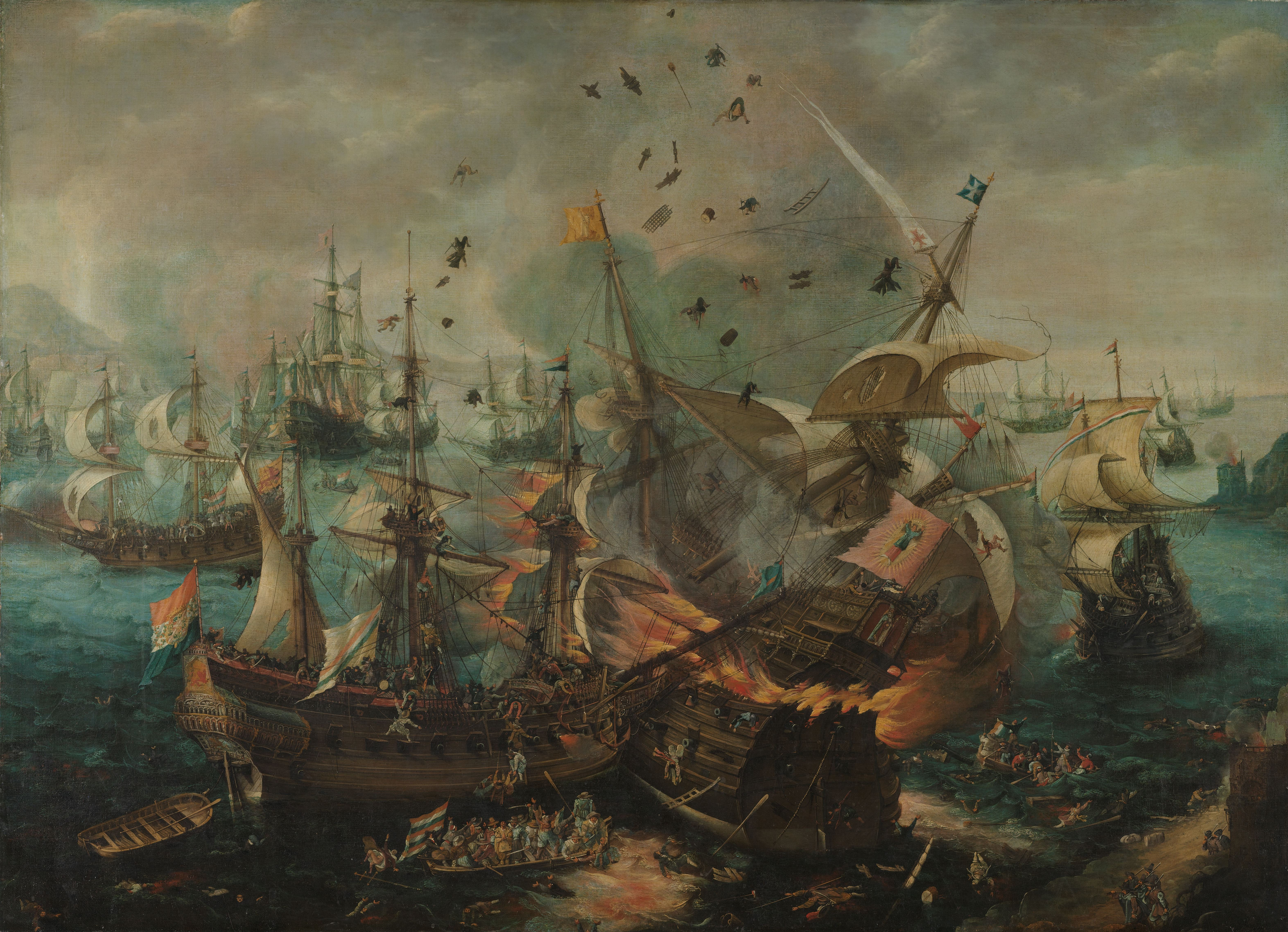
Naval warfare: The explosion of the Spanish flagship during the Battle of Gibraltar, 25 April 1607 by Cornelis Claesz van Wieringen, formerly attributed to Hendrik Cornelisz Vroom

Control of the sea is important to the security of a maritime nation, and the naval blockade of a port can be used to cut off food and supplies in time of war. Battles have been fought on the sea for more than 3,000 years. In about 1210 B.C., Suppiluliuma II, the king of the Hittites, defeated and burned a fleet from Alashiya (modern Cyprus). In the decisive 480 B.C. Battle of Salamis, the Greek general Themistocles trapped the far larger fleet of the Persian king Xerxes in a narrow channel and attacked vigorously, destroying 200 Persian ships for the loss of 40 Greek vessels. At the end of the Age of Sail, the British Royal Navy, led by Horatio Nelson, broke the power of the combined French and Spanish fleets at the 1805 Battle of Trafalgar.

With steam and the industrial production of steel plate came greatly increased firepower in the shape of the dreadnought battleships armed with long-range guns. In 1905, the Japanese fleet decisively defeated the Russian fleet, which had travelled over 18,000 nautical miles (33,000 km), at the Battle of Tsushima. Dreadnoughts fought inconclusively in the First World War at the 1916 Battle of Jutland between the Royal Navy's Grand Fleet and the Imperial German Navy's High Seas Fleet. In the Second World War, the British victory at the 1940 Battle of Taranto showed that naval air power was sufficient to overcome the largest warships, foreshadowing the decisive sea-battles of the Pacific War including the Battles of the Coral Sea, Midway, the Philippine Sea, and the climactic Battle of Leyte Gulf, in all of which the dominant ships were aircraft carriers.

Submarines became important in naval warfare in World War I, when German submarines, known as U-boats, sank nearly 5,000 Allied merchant ships, including the RMS Lusitania, which helped to bring the United States into the war. In World War II, almost 3,000 Allied ships were sunk by U-boats attempting to block the flow of supplies to Britain, but the Allies broke the blockade in the Battle of the Atlantic, which lasted the whole length of the war, sinking 783 U-boats. Since 1960, several nations have maintained fleets of nuclear-powered ballistic missile submarines, vessels equipped to launch ballistic missiles with nuclear warheads from under the sea. Some of these are kept permanently on patrol.

=== Travel ===
Sailing ships or packets carried mail overseas, one of the earliest being the Dutch service to Batavia in the 1670s. These added passenger accommodation, but in cramped conditions. Later, scheduled services were offered but the time journeys took depended much on the weather. When steamships replaced sailing vessels, ocean-going liners took over the task of carrying people. By the beginning of the twentieth century, crossing the Atlantic took about five days and shipping companies competed to own the largest and fastest vessels. The Blue Riband was an unofficial accolade given to the fastest liner crossing the Atlantic in regular service. The Mauretania held the title with 26.06 knots (48.26 km/h) for twenty years from 1909. The Hales Trophy, another award for the fastest commercial crossing of the Atlantic, was won by the United States in 1952 for a crossing that took three days, ten hours and forty minutes.

The great liners were comfortable but expensive in fuel and staff. The age of the trans-Atlantic liners waned as cheap intercontinental flights became available. In 1958, a regular scheduled air service between New York and Paris taking seven hours doomed the Atlantic ferry service to oblivion. One by one the vessels were laid up, some were scrapped, others became cruise ships for the leisure industry and still others floating hotels.

=== Trade ===
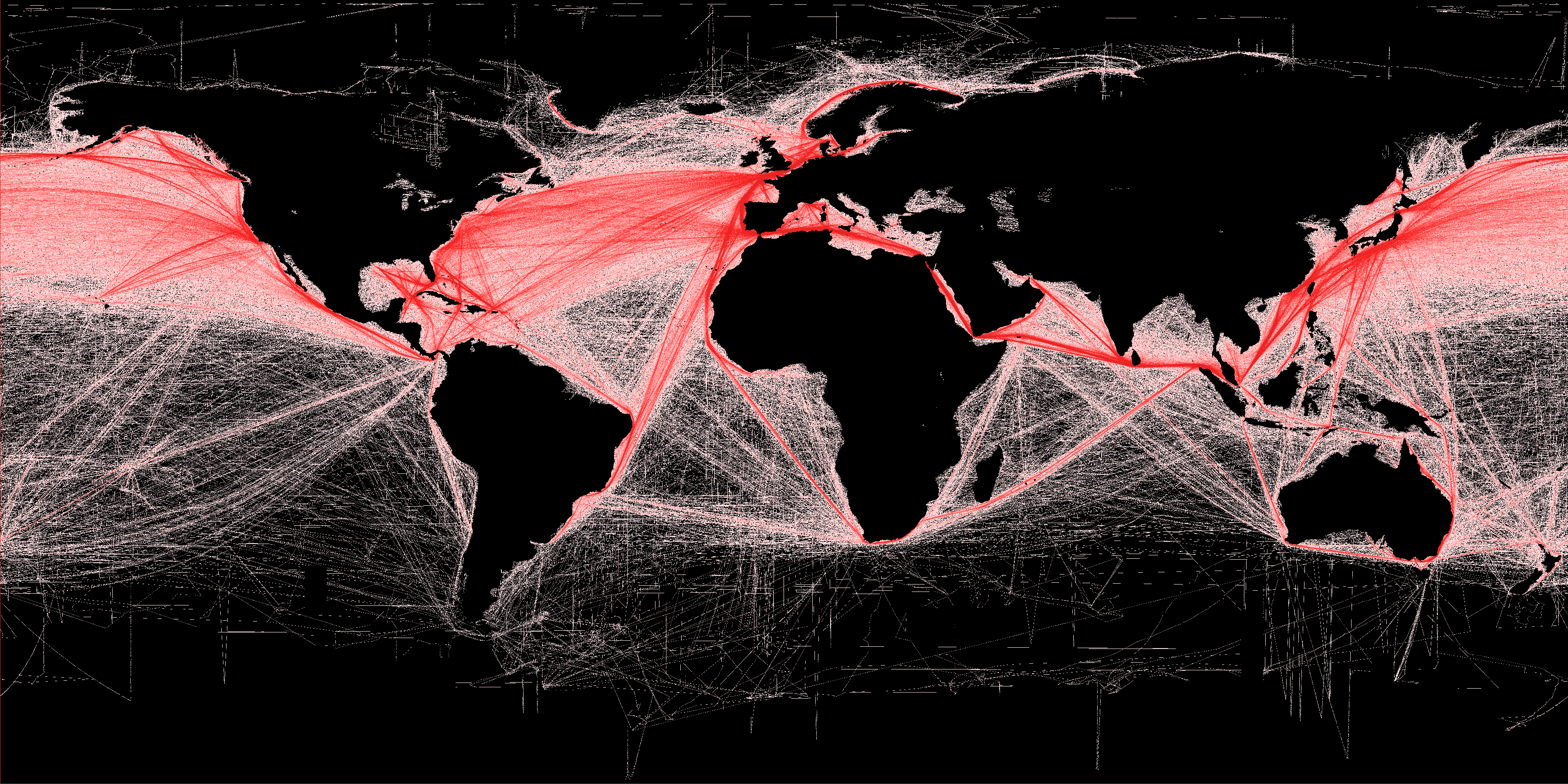
Shipping routes, showing relative density of commercial shipping around the world

Maritime trade has existed for millennia. The Ptolemaic dynasty had developed trade with India using the Red Sea ports, and in the first millennium BC, the Arabs, Phoenicians, Israelites and Indians traded in luxury goods such as spices, gold, and precious stones. The Phoenicians were noted sea traders and under the Greeks and Romans, commerce continued to thrive. With the collapse of the Roman Empire, European trade dwindled but it continued to flourish among the kingdoms of Africa, the Middle East, India, China and southeastern Asia. From the 16th to the 19th centuries, over a period of 400 years, about 12–13 million Africans were shipped across the Atlantic to be sold as slaves in the Americas as part of the Atlantic slave trade.

Large quantities of goods are transported by sea, especially across the Atlantic and around the Pacific Rim. A major trade route passes through the Pillars of Hercules, across the Mediterranean and the Suez Canal to the Indian Ocean and through the Straits of Malacca; much trade also passes through the English Channel. Shipping lanes are the routes on the open sea used by cargo vessels, traditionally making use of trade winds and currents. Over 60 percent of the world's container traffic is conveyed on the top twenty trade routes. Increased melting of Arctic ice since 2007 enables ships to travel the Northwest Passage for some weeks in summertime, avoiding the longer routes via the Suez Canal or the Panama Canal.

Shipping is supplemented by air freight, a more expensive process mostly used for particularly valuable or perishable cargoes. Seaborne trade carries more than US$4 trillion worth of goods each year. Bulk cargo in the form of liquids, powder or particles are carried loose in the holds of bulk carriers and include crude oil, grain, coal, ore, scrap metal, sand and gravel. Other cargo, such as manufactured goods, is usually transported within standard-sized, lockable containers, loaded on purpose-built container ships at dedicated terminals. Before the rise of containerization in the 1960s, these goods were loaded, transported and unloaded piecemeal as break-bulk cargo. Containerization greatly increased the efficiency and decreased the cost of moving goods by sea, and was a major factor leading to the rise of globalization and exponential increases in international trade in the mid-to-late 20th century.

=== Food ===
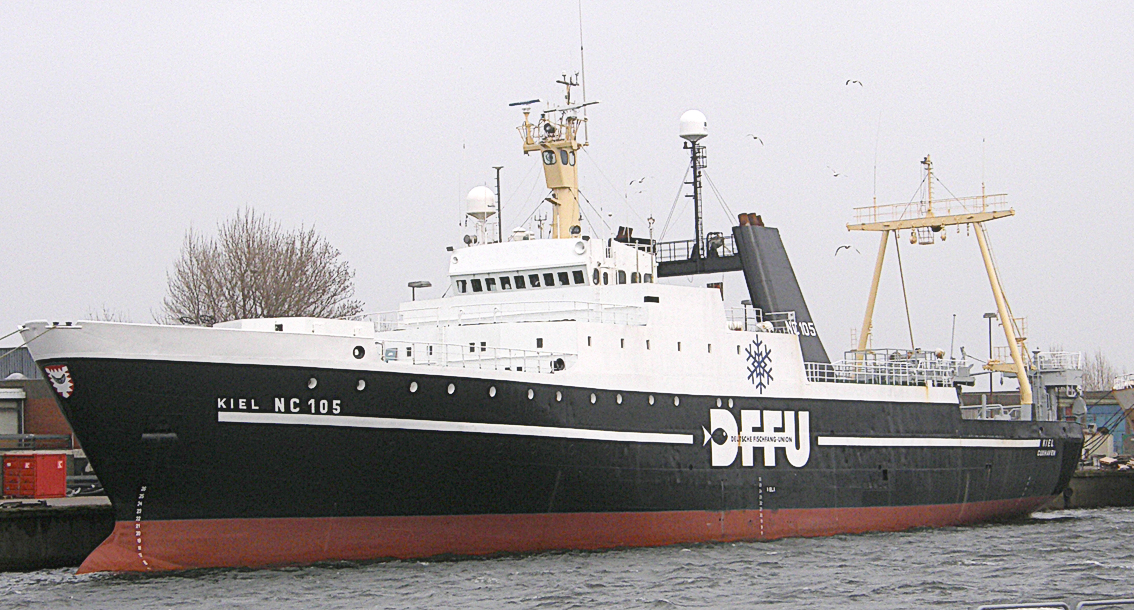
German factory ship, 92 metres (302 ft) long

Fish and other fishery products are among the most widely consumed sources of protein and other essential nutrients. In 2009, 16.6% of the world's intake of animal protein and 6.5% of all protein consumed came from fish. In order to fulfill this need, coastal countries have exploited marine resources in their exclusive economic zone, although fishing vessels are increasingly venturing further afield to exploit stocks in international waters. In 2011, the total world production of fish, including aquaculture, was estimated to be 154 million tonnes, of which most was for human consumption. The harvesting of wild fish accounted for 90.4 million tonnes, while annually increasing aquaculture contributes the rest. The north west Pacific is by far the most productive area with 20.9 million tonnes (27 percent of the global marine catch) in 2010. In addition, the number of fishing vessels in 2010 reached 4.36 million, whereas the number of people employed in the primary sector of fish production in the same year amounted to 54.8 million.

Modern fishing vessels include fishing trawlers with a small crew, stern trawlers, purse seiners, long-line factory vessels and large factory ships which are designed to stay at sea for weeks, processing and freezing great quantities of fish. The equipment used to capture the fish may be purse seines, other seines, trawls, dredges, gillnets and long-lines and the fish species most frequently targeted are herring, cod, anchovy, tuna, flounder, mullet, squid and salmon. Overexploitation has become a serious concern; it does not only cause the depletion of fish stocks, but also substantially reduce the size of predatory fish populations. It has been estimated that "industrialized fisheries typically reduced community biomass by 80% within 15 years of exploitation." In order to avoid overexploitation, many countries have introduced quotas in their own waters. However, recovery efforts often entail substantial costs to local economies or food provision.

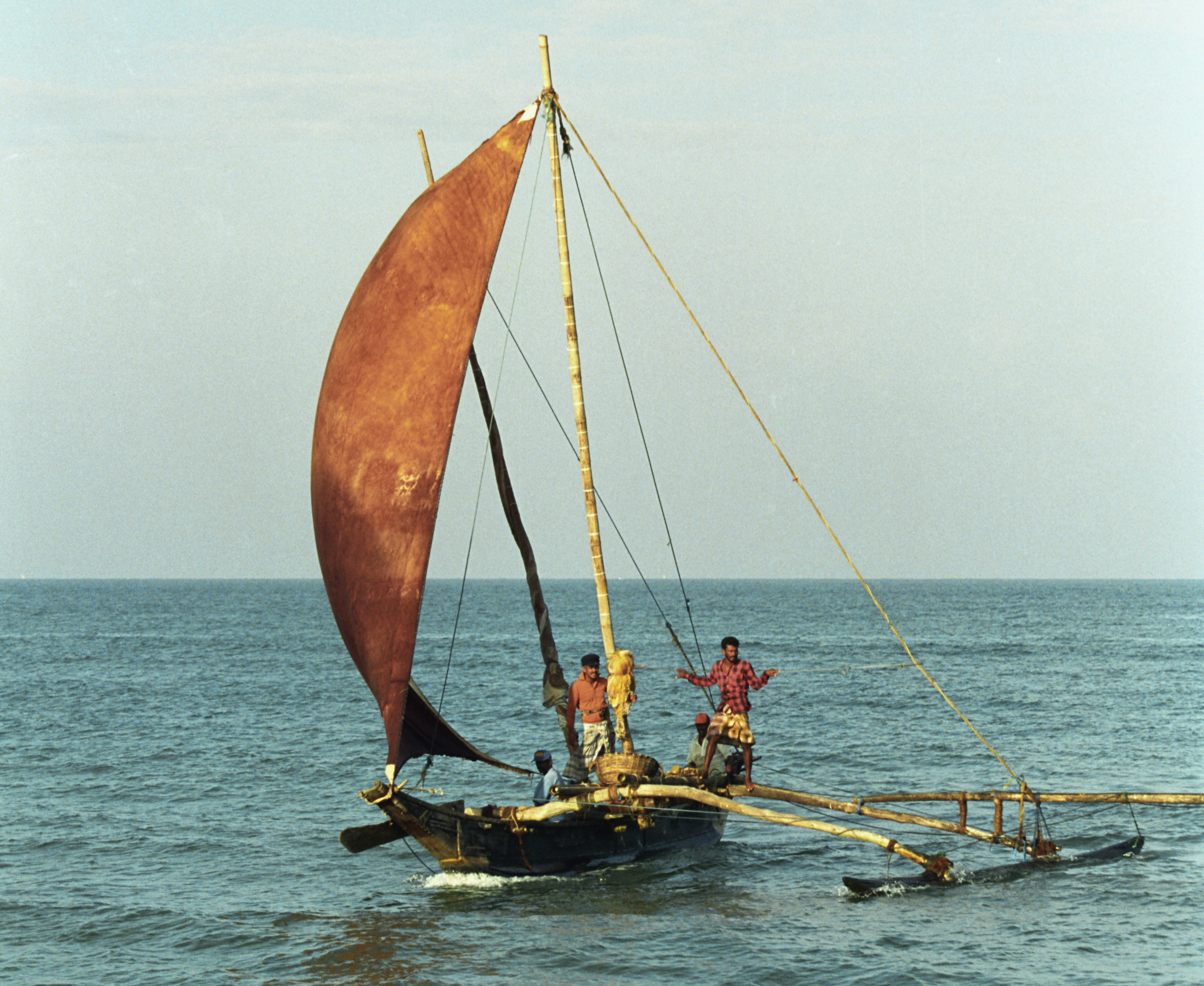
Fishing boat in Sri Lanka

Artisan fishing methods include rod and line, harpoons, skin diving, traps, throw nets and drag nets. Traditional fishing boats are powered by paddle, wind or outboard motors and operate in near-shore waters. The Food and Agriculture Organization is encouraging the development of local fisheries to provide food security to coastal communities and help alleviate poverty.

==== Aquaculture ====
About 79 million tonnes (78M long tons; 87M short tons) of food and non-food products were produced by aquaculture in 2010, an all-time high. About six hundred species of plants and animals were cultured, some for use in seeding wild populations. The animals raised included finfish, aquatic reptiles, crustaceans, molluscs, sea cucumbers, sea urchins, sea squirts and jellyfish. Integrated mariculture has the advantage that there is a readily available supply of planktonic food in the ocean, and waste is removed naturally. Various methods are employed. Mesh enclosures for finfish can be suspended in the open seas, cages can be used in more sheltered waters or ponds can be refreshed with water at each high tide. Shrimps can be reared in shallow ponds connected to the open sea. Ropes can be hung in water to grow algae, oysters and mussels. Oysters can be reared on trays or in mesh tubes. Sea cucumbers can be ranched on the seabed. Captive breeding programmes have raised lobster larvae for release of juveniles into the wild resulting in an increased lobster harvest in Maine. At least 145 species of seaweed – red, green, and brown algae – are eaten worldwide, and some have long been farmed in Japan and other Asian countries; there is great potential for additional algaculture. Few maritime flowering plants are widely used for food but one example is marsh samphire which is eaten both raw and cooked. A major difficulty for aquaculture is the tendency towards monoculture and the associated risk of widespread disease. Aquaculture is also associated with environmental risks; for instance, shrimp farming has caused the destruction of important mangrove forests throughout southeast Asia.

=== Leisure ===
Use of the sea for leisure developed in the nineteenth century, and became a significant industry in the twentieth century. Maritime leisure activities are varied, and include beachgoing, cruising, yachting, powerboat racing and fishing; commercially organized voyages on cruise ships; and trips on smaller vessels for ecotourism such as whale watching and coastal birdwatching.

Scuba diver with face mask, fins and underwater breathing apparatus

Sea bathing became the vogue in Europe in the 18th century after William Buchan advocated the practice for health reasons. Surfing is a sport in which a wave is ridden by a surfer, with or without a surfboard. Other marine water sports include kite surfing, where a power kite propels a rider on a board across the water, windsurfing, where the power is provided by a fixed, manoeuvrable sail and water skiing, where a powerboat is used to pull a skier.

Beneath the surface, freediving is necessarily restricted to shallow descents. Pearl divers can dive to 40 feet (12 m) with baskets to collect oysters. Human eyes are not adapted for use underwater but vision can be improved by wearing a diving mask. Other useful equipment includes fins and snorkels, and scuba equipment allows underwater breathing and hence a longer time can be spent beneath the surface. The depths that can be reached by divers and the length of time they can stay underwater is limited by the increase of pressure they experience as they descend and the need to prevent decompression sickness as they return to the surface. Recreational divers restrict themselves to depths of 100 feet (30 m) beyond which the danger of nitrogen narcosis increases. Deeper dives can be made with specialised equipment and training.

=== Industry ===
==== Power generation ====
The sea offers a very large supply of energy carried by ocean waves, tides, salinity differences, and ocean temperature differences which can be harnessed to generate electricity. Forms of sustainable marine energy include tidal power, ocean thermal energy and wave power. Electricity power stations are often located on the coast or beside an estuary so that the sea can be used as a heat sink. A colder heat sink enables more efficient power generation, which is important for expensive nuclear power plants in particular.

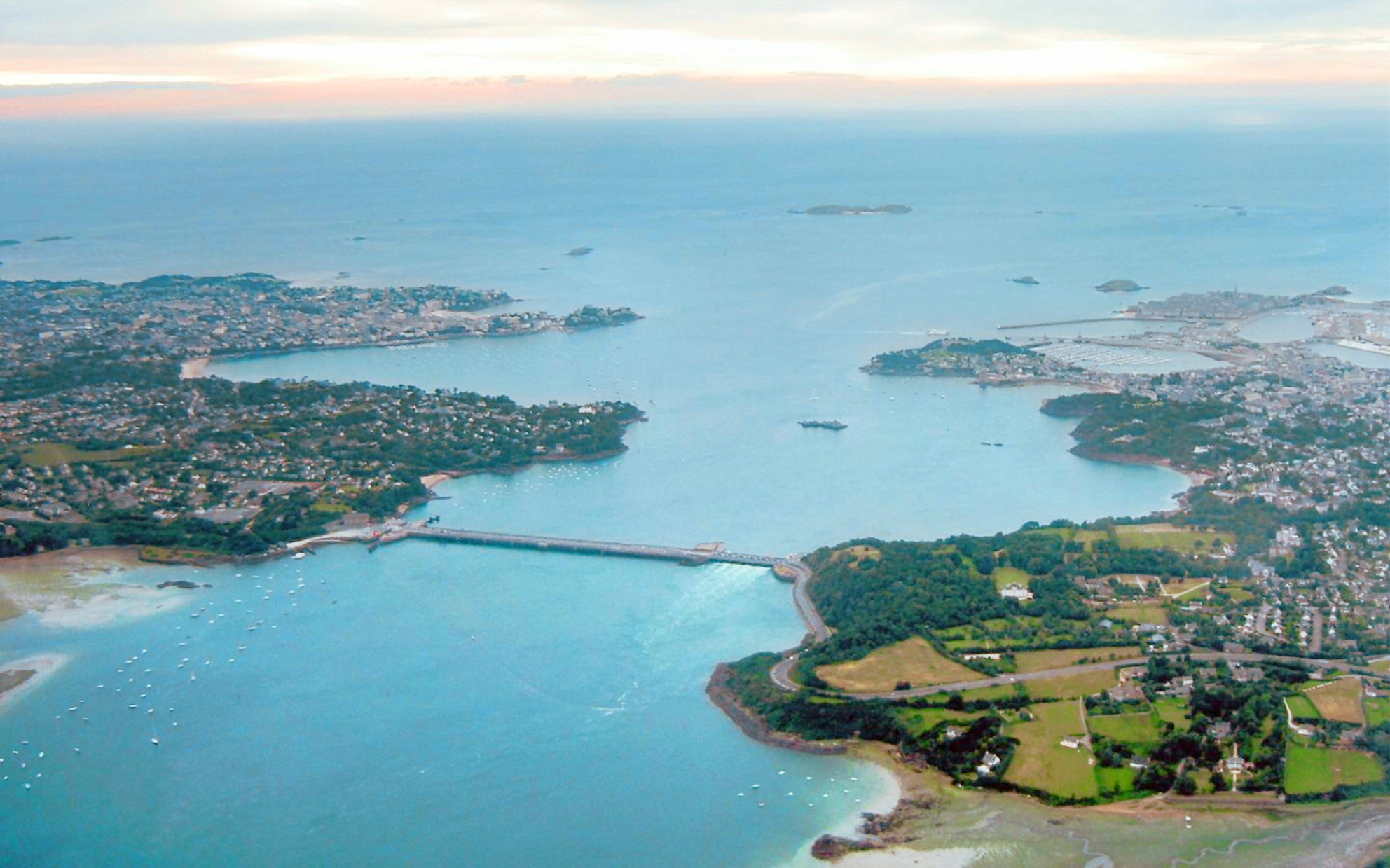
Tidal power: the 1 km Rance Tidal Power Station in Brittany generates 0.5 GW.

Tidal power uses generators to produce electricity from tidal flows, sometimes by using a dam to store and then release seawater. The Rance barrage, 1 kilometre (0.62 mi) long, near St Malo in Brittany opened in 1967; it generates about 0.5 GW, but it has been followed by few similar schemes.

The large and highly variable energy of waves gives them enormous destructive capability, making affordable and reliable wave machines problematic to develop. A small 2 MW commercial wave power plant, "Osprey", was built in Northern Scotland in 1995 about 300 metres (980 feet) offshore. It was soon damaged by waves, then destroyed by a storm.

Offshore wind power is captured by wind turbines placed out at sea; it has the advantage that wind speeds are higher than on land, though wind farms are more costly to construct offshore. The first offshore wind farm was installed in Denmark in 1991, and the installed capacity of worldwide offshore wind farms reached 34 GW in 2020, mainly situated in Europe.

==== Extractive industries ====
The seabed contains large reserves of minerals which can be exploited by dredging. This has advantages over land-based mining in that equipment can be built at specialised shipyards and infrastructure costs are lower. Disadvantages include problems caused by waves and tides, the tendency for excavations to silt up and the washing away of spoil heaps. There is a risk of coastal erosion and environmental damage.

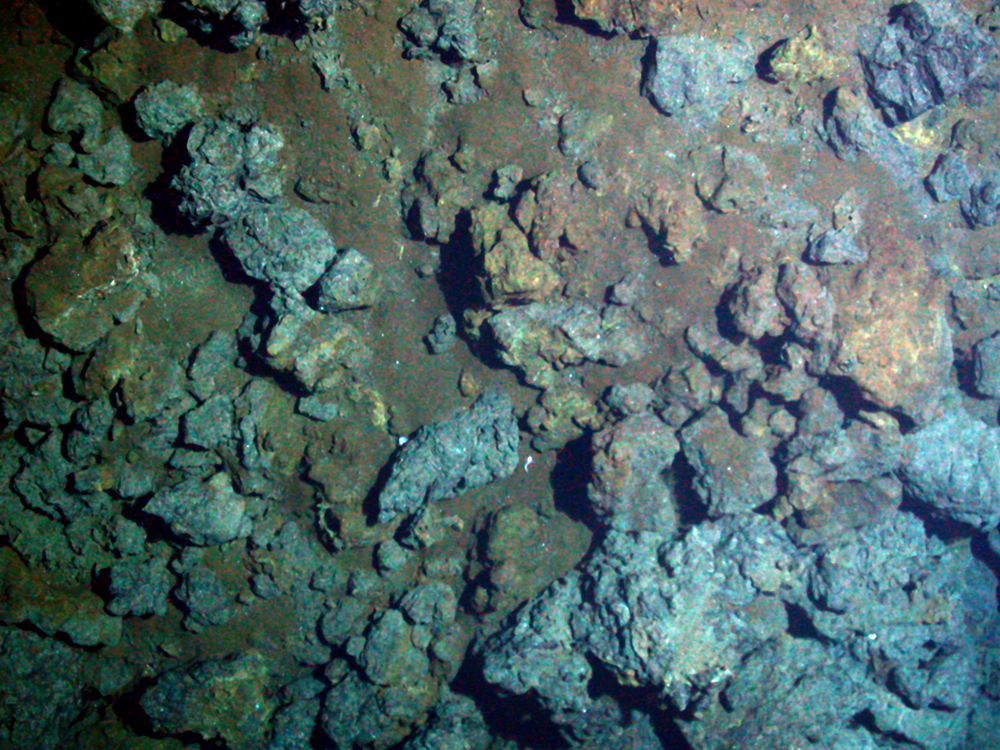
Minerals precipitated near a hydrothermal vent

Seafloor massive sulphide deposits are potential sources of silver, gold, copper, lead and zinc and trace metals since their discovery in the 1960s. They form when geothermally heated water is emitted from deep sea hydrothermal vents known as "black smokers". The ores are of high quality but prohibitively costly to extract.

There are large deposits of petroleum and natural gas, in rocks beneath the seabed. Offshore platforms and drilling rigs extract the oil or gas and store it for transport to land. Offshore oil and gas production can be difficult due to the remote, harsh environment. Drilling for oil in the sea has environmental impacts. Animals may be disorientated by seismic waves used to locate deposits, and there is debate as to whether this causes the beaching of whales. Toxic substances such as mercury, lead and arsenic may be released. The infrastructure may cause damage, and oil may be spilt.

Large quantities of methane clathrate exist on the seabed and in ocean sediment, of interest as a potential energy source. Also on the seabed are manganese nodules formed of layers of iron, manganese and other hydroxides around a core. In the Pacific, these may cover up to 30 percent of the deep ocean floor. The minerals precipitate from seawater and grow very slowly. Their commercial extraction for nickel was investigated in the 1970s but abandoned in favour of more convenient sources. In suitable locations, diamonds are gathered from the seafloor using suction hoses to bring gravel ashore. In deeper waters, mobile seafloor crawlers are used and the deposits are pumped to a vessel above. In Namibia, more diamonds are now collected from marine sources than by conventional methods on land.

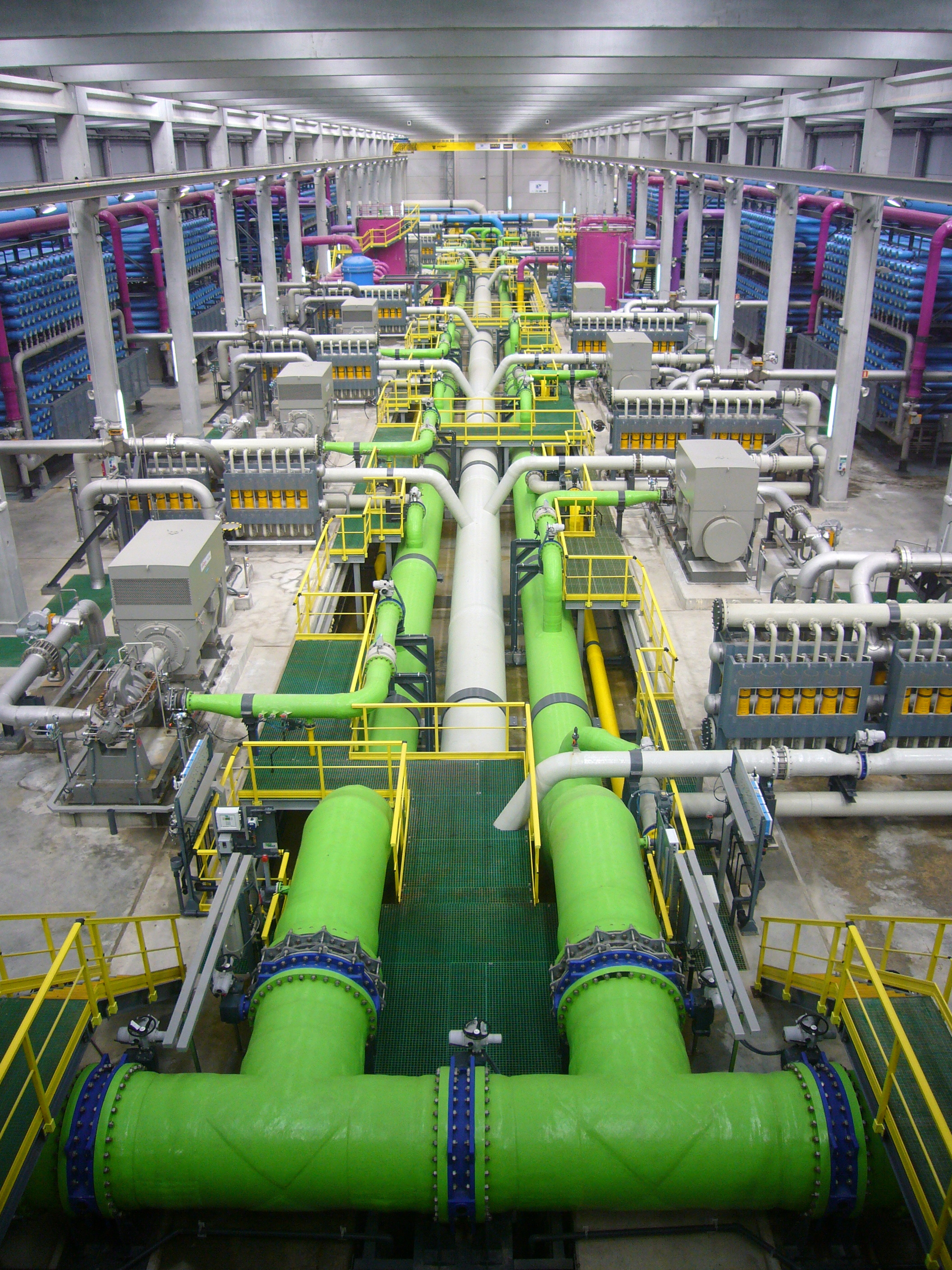
Reverse osmosis desalination plant

The sea holds large quantities of valuable dissolved minerals. The most important, Salt for table and industrial use has been harvested by solar evaporation from shallow ponds since prehistoric times. Bromine, accumulated after being leached from the land, is economically recovered from the Dead Sea, where it occurs at 55,000 parts per million (ppm).

=== Fresh water production ===
Desalination is the technique of removing salts from seawater to leave fresh water suitable for drinking or irrigation. The two main processing methods, vacuum distillation and reverse osmosis, use large quantities of energy. Desalination is normally only undertaken where fresh water from other sources is in short supply or energy is plentiful, as in the excess heat generated by power stations. The brine produced as a by-product contains some toxic materials and is returned to the sea.

=== Indigenous sea peoples ===
Several nomadic indigenous groups in Maritime Southeast Asia live in boats and derive nearly all they need from the sea. The Moken people live on the coasts of Thailand and Burma and islands in the Andaman Sea. Some Sea Gypsies are accomplished free-divers, able to descend to depths of 30 metres (98 ft), though many are adopting a more settled, land-based way of life.

The indigenous peoples of the Arctic such as the Chukchi, Inuit, Inuvialuit and Yup'iit hunt marine mammals including seals and whales, and the Torres Strait Islanders of Australia include the Great Barrier Reef among their possessions. They live a traditional life on the islands involving hunting, fishing, gardening and trading with neighbouring peoples in Papua and mainland Aboriginal Australians.

=== In culture ===
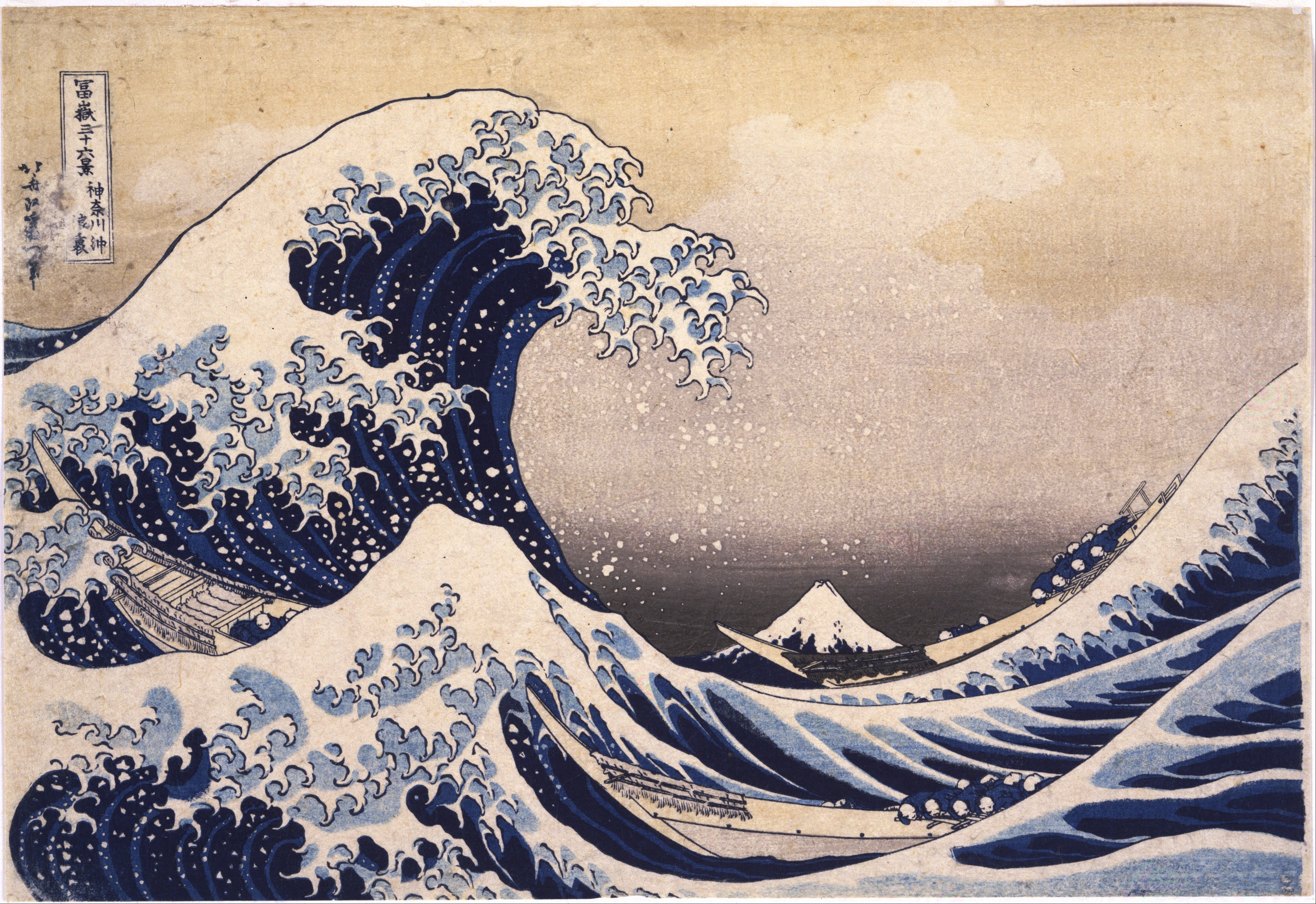
The Great Wave off Kanagawa by Katsushika Hokusai, c. 1830

The sea appears in human culture in contradictory ways, as both powerful but serene and as beautiful but dangerous. It has its place in literature, art, poetry, film, theatre, classical music, mythology and dream interpretation. The Ancients personified it, believing it to be under the control of a being who needed to be appeased, and symbolically, it has been perceived as a hostile environment populated by fantastic creatures; the Leviathan of the Bible, Scylla in Greek mythology, Isonade in Japanese mythology, and the kraken of late Norse mythology.

The sea and ships have been depicted in art ranging from simple drawings on the walls of huts in Lamu to seascapes by Joseph Turner. In Dutch Golden Age painting, artists such as Jan Porcellis, Hendrick Dubbels, Willem van de Velde the Elder and his son, and Ludolf Bakhuizen celebrated the sea and the Dutch navy at the peak of its military prowess. The Japanese artist Katsushika Hokusai created colour prints of the moods of the sea, including The Great Wave off Kanagawa.

In Islamic tradition, the sea symbolizes both the mercy and might of God, serving as a powerful sign (ayah) of divine creation and control over nature. The Qur'an frequently references the sea to illustrate God's benevolence, as in: "It is He who subjected the sea so that you may eat fresh meat from it and extract ornaments which you wear" (Qur'an 16:14), while also portraying it as a place of trial and humility, as seen in verses that describe the helplessness of humans during storms at sea (Qur'an 10:22). The sea's dual nature, as a source of sustenance and a manifestation of divine power, reflects a broader Islamic perspective that views natural elements as signs pointing to the oneness and majesty of God. This contrasts with certain other religious traditions; for instance, the sea in biblical literature is often associated with chaos and danger, while in Hindu mythology, it plays a role in cosmic cycles such as the Samudra Manthan, the churning of the ocean. Islamic scholarship, including classical tafsir (Qur'anic exegesis), emphasizes that the sea is not merely a physical reality but a theological symbol that calls believers to reflect on God's greatness and their own dependence on Him.

Music too has been inspired by the ocean, sometimes by composers who lived or worked near the shore and saw its many different aspects. Sea shanties, songs that were chanted by mariners to help them perform arduous tasks, have been woven into compositions and impressions in music have been created of calm waters, crashing waves and storms at sea.

As a symbol, the sea has for centuries played a role in literature, poetry and dreams. Sometimes it is there just as a gentle background but often it introduces such themes as storm, shipwreck, battle, hardship, disaster, the dashing of hopes and death. In his epic poem the Odyssey, written in the eighth century BC, Homer describes the ten-year voyage of the Greek hero Odysseus who struggles to return home across the sea's many hazards after the war described in the Iliad. The sea is a recurring theme in the Haiku poems of the Japanese Edo period poet Matsuo Bashō (松尾 芭蕉) (1644–1694). In the works of psychiatrist Carl Jung, the sea symbolizes the personal and the collective unconscious in dream interpretation, the depths of the sea symbolizing the depths of the unconscious mind.

== Environmental issues ==
The environmental issues that affect the sea can loosely be grouped into those that stem from marine pollution, from over exploitation and those that stem from climate change. They all impact marine ecosystems and food webs and may result in consequences as yet unrecognised for the biodiversity and continuation of marine life forms. An overview of environmental issues is shown below:

- Marine pollution: Pathways of pollution include direct discharge, land runoff, ship pollution, atmospheric pollution and, potentially, deep sea mining. The types of marine pollution can be grouped as pollution from marine debris, plastic pollution, including microplastics, nutrient pollution, toxins and underwater noise.
- Over exploitation and biodiversity loss: overfishing, habitat loss, introduction of invasive species.
- Effects of climate change on the sea: an increase in sea surface temperature as well as ocean temperatures at greater depths, more frequent marine heatwaves, a reduction in pH value, a rise in sea level from ocean warming and ice sheet melting, sea ice decline in the Arctic, increased upper ocean stratification, reductions in oxygen levels, increased contrasts in salinity (salty areas becoming saltier and fresher areas becoming less salty), changes to ocean currents including a weakening of the Atlantic meridional overturning circulation, and stronger tropical cyclones and monsoons.

=== Marine pollution ===
Many substances enter the sea as a result of human activities. Combustion products are transported in the air and deposited into the sea by precipitation. Industrial outflows and sewage contribute heavy metals, pesticides, PCBs, disinfectants, household cleaning products and other synthetic chemicals. These become concentrated in the surface film and in marine sediment, especially estuarine mud. The result of all this contamination is largely unknown because of the large number of substances involved and the lack of information on their biological effects. The heavy metals of greatest concern are copper, lead, mercury, cadmium and zinc which may be bio-accumulated by marine organisms and are passed up the food chain.

Much floating plastic rubbish does not biodegrade, instead disintegrating over time and eventually breaking down to the molecular level. Rigid plastics may float for years. In the centre of the Pacific gyre there is the permanent Great Pacific Garbage Patch, a floating accumulation of mostly plastic waste. There is a similar garbage patch in the Atlantic. Foraging sea birds such as the albatross and petrel may mistake debris for food, and accumulate indigestible plastic in their digestive systems. Turtles and whales have been found with plastic bags and fishing line in their stomachs. Microplastics may sink, threatening filter feeders on the seabed.

Most oil pollution in the sea comes from cities and industry. Oil is dangerous for marine animals. It can clog the feathers of sea birds, reducing their insulating effect and the birds' buoyancy, and be ingested when they preen themselves in an attempt to remove the contaminant. Marine mammals are less seriously affected but may be chilled through the removal of their insulation, blinded, dehydrated or poisoned. Benthic invertebrates are swamped when the oil sinks, fish are poisoned and the food chain is disrupted. In the short term, oil spills result in wildlife populations being decreased and unbalanced, leisure activities being affected and the livelihoods of people dependent on the sea being devastated. The marine environment has self-cleansing properties and naturally occurring bacteria will act over time to remove oil from the sea. In the Gulf of Mexico, where oil-eating bacteria are already present, they take only a few days to consume spilt oil.

Run-off of fertilisers from agricultural land is a major source of pollution in some areas and the discharge of raw sewage has a similar effect. The extra nutrients provided by these sources can cause excessive plant growth. Nitrogen is often the limiting factor in marine systems, and with added nitrogen, algal blooms and red tides can lower the oxygen level of the water and kill marine animals. Such events have created dead zones in the Baltic Sea and the Gulf of Mexico. Some algal blooms are caused by cyanobacteria that make shellfish that filter feed on them toxic, harming animals like sea otters. Nuclear facilities too can pollute. The Irish Sea was contaminated by radioactive caesium-137 from the former Sellafield nuclear fuel processing plant and nuclear accidents may also cause radioactive material to seep into the sea, as did the disaster at the Fukushima Daiichi Nuclear Power Plant in 2011.

The dumping of waste (including oil, noxious liquids, sewage and garbage) at sea is governed by international law. The London Convention (1972) is a United Nations agreement to control ocean dumping which had been ratified by 89 countries by 8 June 2012. MARPOL 73/78 is a convention to minimize pollution of the seas by ships. By May 2013, 152 maritime nations had ratified MARPOL.

== See also ==
- Ocean surface topography – Shape of the ocean surface relative to the geoid
- List of seas
- Bay
- Gulf
