= Maelstrom =

Maelstrom most often refers to:

- A powerful whirlpool
  - Originally the Moskstraumen in English

Maelstrom may also refer to:

== Amusement rides ==
- Maelstrom (ride), a former log flume dark ride attraction in the Epcot theme park at Walt Disney World Resort in Florida
- Maelstrom, a spinning flat thrill ride at Morey's Piers in Wildwood, New Jersey
- Maelstrom, a gyro swing ride at Drayton Manor Theme Park, Staffordshire, UK

== Characters ==
- Maelstrom (comics), fictional character that appears in comic books published by Marvel Comics
- Maelstrom, a character in the Ice Age films
- Mael Strom, aka Yuki Yoshida, from the anime/manga Is This a Zombie?
- Professor Maelstrom, a fictional villain in the 2019 Netflix series Carmen Sandiego
- Maelstrom, also known as Wazir Kale, from Hitman 2

== Film and television ==
- Maelström (film), a 2000 Canadian film
- Maelstrom (TV series), a 1985 BBC television drama serial
- "Maelstrom" (Battlestar Galactica)

== Games ==
- Maelstrom (1992 video game), an Apple Macintosh game
- Maelstrom (role-playing game), by Alexander Scott
- Maelstrom (video game), a 2007 PC game
- VOR: The Maelstrom, a miniature wargame
- Maelstrom (Live Action Roleplaying), a live action roleplaying game run 2004–2012 by Profound Decisions
- Maelstrom, a lightning-based hammer item in the video game "Dota 2"
- Maelstrom, a gang in Cyberpunk 2077
- Maelstrom, a huge whirlpool in the Warcraft game franchise

== Literature ==
- "A Descent into the Maelström", an 1841 short story by Edgar Allan Poe
- Maelstrom (Timms novel), by E.V. Timms
- Maelstrom, a 2001 novel by Peter Watts
- Maelstrom, a 2006 novel in the Petaybee universe by Anne McCaffrey and Elizabeth Ann Scarborough
- Maelstrom, a 2017 novel by Yael Inokai
- Maelstrom (Destroyermen novel), the third book of the Destroyermen series

== Music ==
- Maelstrom, an album by JR Ewing
- Mælstrøm, an album by the Belgian crust punk band Oathbreaker
- "Descent into the Maelstrom", a song by the Australian band Radio Birdman on the album Radios Appear
- "Maelstrom", a song by The Steve Miller Band on the album Living in the 20th Century
- "Maelstrom", a composition by Julian Cochran
- "The Maelstrom", a composition by Robert W. Smith
- "Maelstrom 2010", a song by the Canadian melodic death metal band Kataklysm on the album Temple of Knowledge
- Maelstrom, a Boston-based thrash metal band active from the late 1980s to the early 1990s that released an LP on Taang! Records
