= Hundred-year wave =

Statistically projected water wave

A hundred-year wave is a statistically projected water wave, the height of which, on average, is met or exceeded once in a hundred years for a given location. The likelihood of this wave height being attained at least once in the hundred-year period is 63%. As a projection of the most extreme wave which can be expected to occur in a given body of water, the hundred-year wave is a factor commonly taken into consideration by designers of oil platforms and other offshore structures. Periods of time other than a hundred years may also be taken into account, resulting in, for instance, a fifty-year wave.

Various methods are employed to predict the possible steepness and period of these waves, in addition to their height.

== See also ==
- Index of wave articles
- Significant wave height
- Shallow water equations
- Rogue wave
