= Wien's law =

Wien's law or Wien law may refer to:

- Wien approximation, an equation used to describe the short-wavelength (high frequency) spectrum of thermal radiation
- Wien's displacement law, an equation that describes the relationship between the temperature of an object and the peak wavelength or frequency of the emitted light
