= Wave velocity =

Wave velocity may refer to:

- Phase velocity, the velocity at which a wave phase propagates
- Pulse wave velocity, the velocity at which a pulse travels through a medium, usually applied to arteries as a measure of arterial stiffness
- Group velocity, the propagation velocity for the envelope of wave groups and often of wave energy, different from the phase velocity for dispersive waves
- Signal velocity, the velocity at which a wave carries information
- Front velocity, the velocity at which the first rise of a pulse above zero moves forward
