= X-wave =

Stable type of wave in physics

In physics, X-waves are a type of wave superposition (or wavepacket) exhibiting a distinctive double-cone structure with its axis aligned along the propagation direction. The energy of the wave is concentrated along the vertex of this double cone, creating an "X" shape when intersected by a plane containing the propagation axis. These structures are also known as conical waves. X-waves possess several remarkable properties:

1. Weak Localization: They are weakly localized solutions of the wave equation, meaning they are extended both spatially and temporally.
2. Propagation Invariance: Under specific conditions, they maintain their shape during propagation, resisting the effects of diffraction and dispersion. This occurs when dispersion precisely balances diffraction, preventing the wavepacket from spreading.

X-waves can manifest as sound, electromagnetic, or gravitational waves.

X-waves generalize the concept of diffraction-free solutions, exemplified by monochromatic Bessel beams, to include wavepackets composed of multiple frequency components. To achieve propagation invariance, each frequency component must have the same velocity along the propagation axis. Therefore, an X-wave can be constructed as a non-monochromatic superposition of Bessel beams.

Like ideal Bessel beams, ideal X-waves are mathematical constructs possessing infinite energy. However, finite-energy approximations have been experimentally observed in various physical contexts. X-wave pulses can exhibit superluminal phase and group velocity. Furthermore, X-wave solutions have been reported within a quantum mechanical framework in optics.

== See also ==
- Nonlinear X-wave
- Droplet-shaped wave
