= Droplet-shaped wave =

In physics, droplet-shaped waves are casual localized solutions of the wave equation closely related to the X-shaped waves, but, in contrast, possessing a finite support.

A family of the droplet-shaped waves was obtained by extension of the "toy model" of X-wave generation by a superluminal point electric charge (tachyon) at infinite rectilinear motion to the case of a line source pulse started at time t = 0. The pulse front is supposed to propagate with a constant superluminal velocity v = βc (here c is the speed of light, so β > 1).

In the cylindrical spacetime coordinate system τ=ct, ρ, φ, z, originated in the point of pulse generation and oriented along the (given) line of source propagation (direction z), the general expression for such a source pulse takes the form

$$s(\tau ,\rho ,z) =
\frac{\delta (\rho )} {2\pi \rho}
J(\tau ,z) H(\beta \tau -z) H(z),$$

where δ(•) and H(•) are, correspondingly, the Dirac delta and Heaviside step functions while J(τ, z) is an arbitrary continuous function representing the pulse shape. Notably, H (βτ − z) H (z) = 0 for τ < 0, so s (τ, ρ, z) = 0 for τ < 0 as well.

As far as the wave source does not exist prior to the moment τ = 0, a one-time application of the causality principle implies zero wavefunction ψ (τ, ρ, z) for negative values of time.

As a consequence, ψ is uniquely defined by the problem for the wave equation with the time-asymmetric homogeneous initial condition

$$\begin{align}
& \left[
\partial _\tau ^2 - \rho^{-1} \partial_\rho (\rho \partial_\rho) - \partial _z^2 \right]
\psi(\tau,\rho,z) = s(\tau,\rho,z) \\
& \psi(\tau,\rho,z) = 0 \quad \text{for}  \quad \tau < 0
\end{align}$$

The general integral solution for the resulting waves and the analytical description of their finite, droplet-shaped support can be obtained from the above problem using the STTD technique.

== See also ==
- X-wave
