= Nonlinear X-wave =

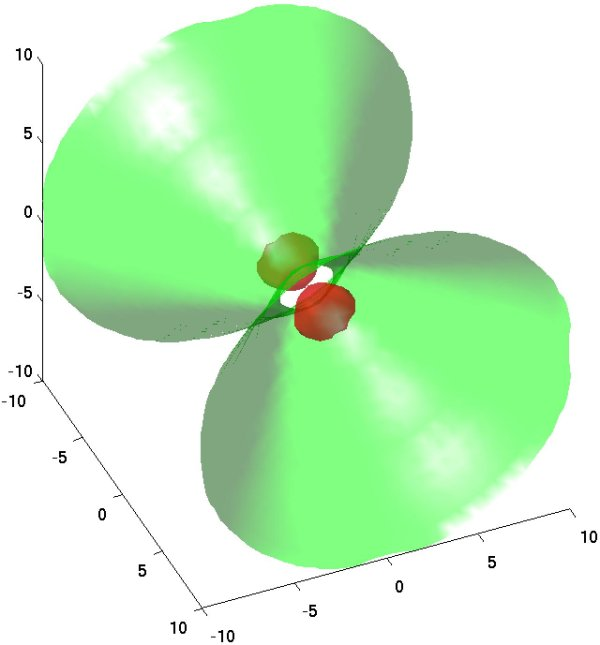
Nonlinear X-wave schematic view

In physics, a nonlinear X-wave (NLX) is a multi-dimensional wave that can travel without distortion.

At variance with X-waves, a nonlinear X-wave does exist in the presence of nonlinearity, and in many cases it self-generates from a Gaussian (in any direction) wave packet.

The distinctive feature of an NLX is its "biconical" shape, (see figure) which appears as an "X" in any section plane containing the wave peak and the direction of propagation.

So far, nonlinear X-waves have been only observed in nonlinear optics experiments, and have been predicted to occur in a variety of nonlinear media including Bose–Einstein condensates.

== History ==
- Preliminary experimental results were reported CLEO/QELS conference in 2001
- The first article was published in Physical Review Letters in 2003 and reported on the theoretical prediction of the existence of nonlinear X-waves.
- The first experimental results also appeared in Physical Review Letters in 2003.
