= Carl Hagen =

Carl Hagen may refer to:

- Carl I. Hagen (born 1944), Norwegian politician
- Carl Fredrik Hagen (born 1991), Norwegian cyclist
- Carl Heinrich Hagen (1785–1856), jurist, socio-economist and government official
- Carl Heinrich Wilhelm Hagen (1810–1868), German historian and politician
- C. R. Hagen (born 1937), professor of particle physics

== See also ==
- Karl Gottfried Hagen (1749–1829), German chemist
