= Ernst Bessel Hagen =

German physicist

Ernst Hagen
- Born: Carl Ernst Bessel Hagen; January 31, 1851; Königsberg, Kingdom of Prussia
- Died: January 15, 1923 (aged 71); Solln, Germany
- Education: Heidelberg University
- Known for: Hagen–Rubens relation
- Parent: Adolf Hermann Hagen
- Scientific career
- Fields: Physics; Optics
- Workplaces: Dresden Polytechnikum
- Doctoral advisor: Robert Bunsen

Carl Ernst Bessel Hagen (who published under the name Ernst Hagen; 31 January 1851 – 15 January 1923) was a German applied and experimental physicist. With Heinrich Rubens, he identified the so-called Hagen–Rubens equation (1903).

== Life ==
Carl Ernst Bessel Hagen was born in Königsberg (rebuilt and relaunched as Kaliningrad after the 1945 expulsion), eldest of the three recorded sons of the banker-politician Adolf Hermann Hagen (1820–1894) by his first marriage, which was to Johanna Louise Amalie Bessel (1826–1856). Both his grandfathers were distinguished members of the German academic community. Carl Heinrich Hagen (1785–1856) was a socio-economist, a professor of jurisprudence and, between 1811 and 1835, a senior Prussian government official (Regierungsrat). Friedrich Bessel (1784 - 1846) was a pioneering astronomer, mathematician, physicist and geodesist.

He graduated successfully from the Heinrich-Schliemann-Gymnasium (secondary school) in 1871 and went on to study university level maths, physics and chemistry at Humboldt University of Berlin and Heidelberg University. In Heidelberg, between 1873 and 1875 he combined his studies with work as an assistant to Robert Bunsen. It was Bunsen who supervised him for his doctorate, which he received in 1875. There followed two years at the Dresden Polytechnikum where he worked as a research assistant with August Toepler (whose design for a mercury vacuum pump he subsequently improved). Then, for six years between 1878 and 1883, he worked with Hermann von Helmholtz at Humboldt University of Berlin. It was at Berlin that in 1883 he received his habilitation for work on the thermal expansion of alkali metals. He then worked as a Privatdozent of physical observational methodology (German: Physikalische Beobachtungsmethodik), and later of physiological optics (German: Physiologische Optik).

In 1884. Hagen undertook a study trip to the United States to investigate the infant technology of electric lighting. He followed this up in 1885 with a book which did much to raise his public and academic profile. He found himself frequently called upon by public bodies to share his expertise on the subject.

He then returned to the Dresden Polytechnikum where he served as extraordinary professor for applied physics and director at the institution's newly founded Electro-Technology Laboratory between 1884 and 1888. In 1887 he was appointed chief electrical engineer and physicist with the Imperial Navy and the Admiralitätsrat in Kiel. Then in 1893, he was appointed to direct Department II (German: zweite Abteilung) of the Physikalisch-Technische Bundesanstalt which had been set up six years earlier in Berlin-Charlottenburg under the overall direction of his old mentor, Hermann von Helmholtz. Hagen remained at the PTR till his retirement in 1918. His retirement from the institute was attributed to "health grounds" rather than to his age. Sources indicate that organisational changes introduced after the PTR came under the control of Emil Warburg (shortly before the outbreak of the First World War) also contributed to Hagen's decision to retire when he did.

Hagen's other appointments during these years included membership, from 1894, of the Imperial Standards Commission (German: Kaiserliche Normaleichungskommission). Between 1895 and 1908 he was a part-time member of the patent office. He was also actively involved in the governance of the Deutsches Museum in Munich.

== Hagen–Rubens equation ==
Between 1897 and 1908 Hagen teamed up with Heinrich Rubens to research reflection and emission from electromagnetic radio waves through metal, and to investigate their relationships with electrical conductivity. This work led to the identification of the so-called Hagen-Rubens equation (1903), which defines the relationship between optical reflection and electrical conductivity as an approximation in the range of the infrared spectrum. Hagen was also involved with Rubens' extensive investigations into black body transmittance. The work undertaken by Hagen and Rubens had the effect of confirming Maxwell's equations, notably with respect to the three-vector elements of a constant, non-frequency dependent conductivity up to the infrared frequency range.

== Personal ==
In 1896 Ernst Bessel Hagen married Wilhelmine von Bezold (1870–1939) in Berlin. Her father was the notable meteorologist Wilhelm von Bezold. The marriage produced two recorded sons.

Ernst Bessel Hagen's younger brother, Fritz Karl Bessel-Hagen (1856-1945) also achieved a measure of notability as an eminent Berlin surgeon who in 1880, while still a student, was involved in the reburial of the body of Immanuel Kant. (He later wrote about it.)
