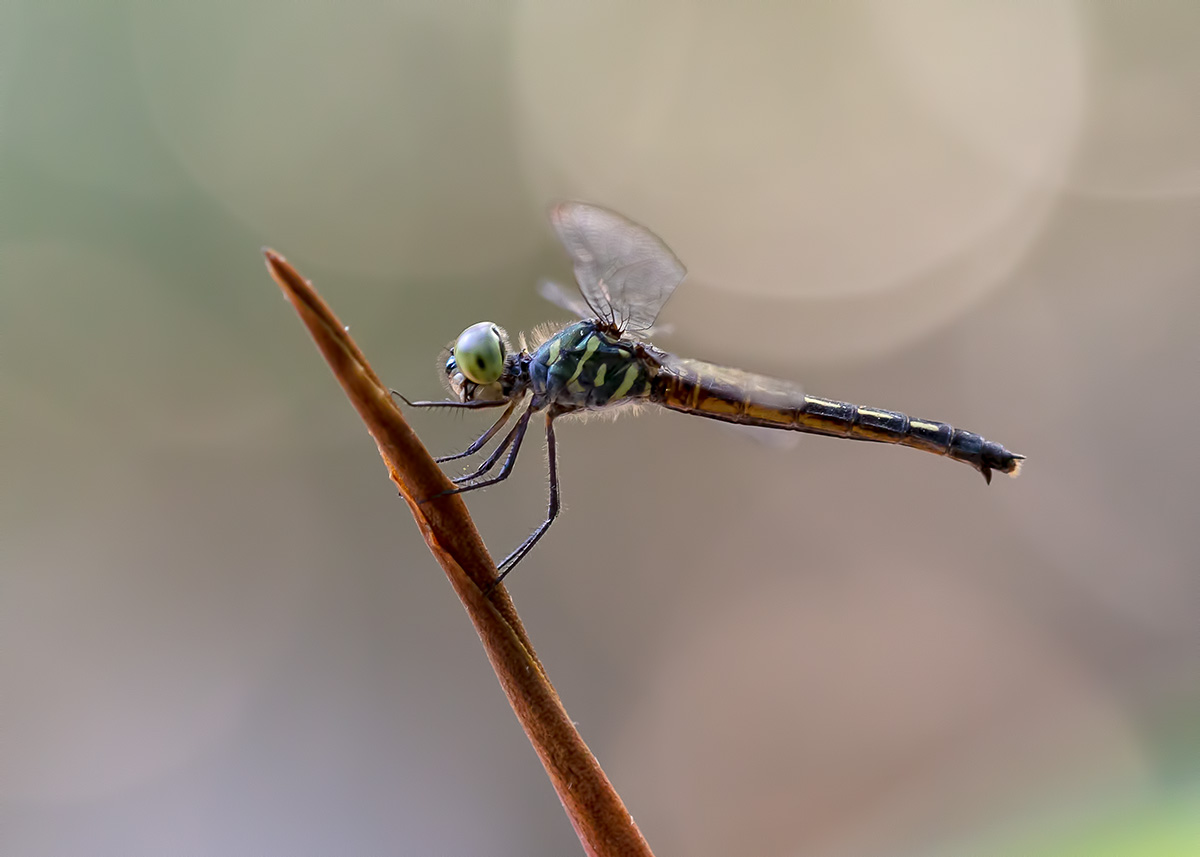
- Female

Conservation status
- Least Concern (IUCN 3.1)

Scientific classification
- Kingdom: Animalia
- Phylum: Arthropoda
- Clade: Pancrustacea
- Class: Insecta
- Order: Odonata
- Infraorder: Anisoptera
- Family: Libellulidae
- Genus: Raphismia
- Species: R. bispina

Binomial name
- Raphismia bispina (Hagen, 1867)

Synonyms
- Diplax bispina Hagen, 1867; Diplax thoracantha Brauer, 1867

= Raphismia bispina =

Spiny-chested percher

Species of dragonfly

Raphismia bispina is a species of dragonfly of the family Libellulidae, known as the spiny-chested percher. It is found in Malaysia, Philippines, Indonesia, New Guinea, and Australia. It is the only Australian species of Raphismia, where it is found in mangrove swamps on Cape York, Queensland. It is a small dragonfly with metallic-black colouring which gets a pruinescent powder-blue coating when mature.

== Etymology ==
The genus name Raphismia is derived from the Greek ῥαφίς (rhaphis, "needle"), referring to the two small spines on the lower thorax of the male.

The species name bispina is derived from the Latin bi- ("two") and spina ("thorn" or "spine"), also referring to the two small spines on the lower thorax of the male.

== Gallery ==
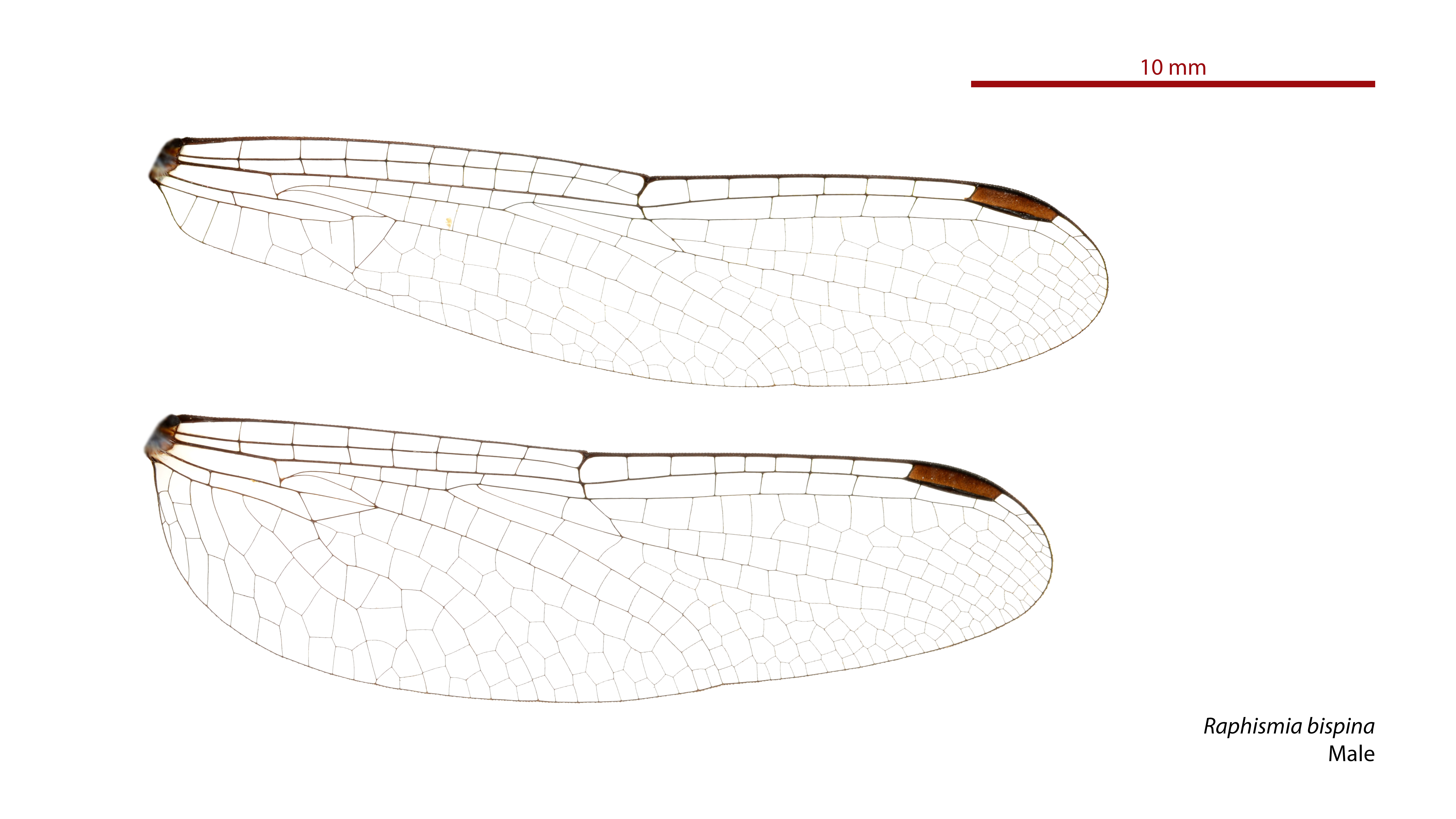
Male wings

== See also ==
- List of Odonata species of Australia
