= Adolf Hermann Hagen =

German politician (1820–1894)

Adolf Hermann Wilhelm Hagen
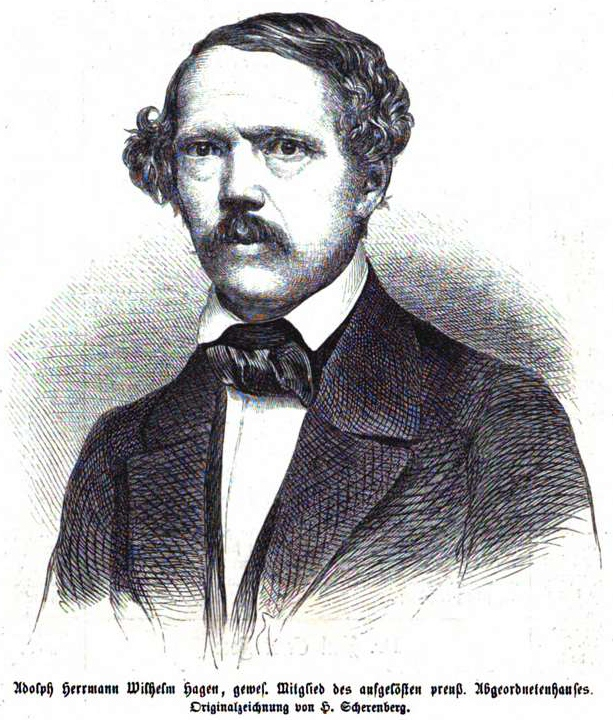
- Adolph Hermann Wilhelm Hagen in 1862
- Born: 23 September 1820; Königsberg, East Prussia
- Died: 17 August 1894 (aged 73); Golling an der Salzach, Austria
- Occupations: Politician; Banker
- Spouses: 1. Johanna Louise Amalie Bessel (1826–1856); 2. Anna Claussen (1831–1905)
- Children: Ernst Bessel Hagen, physicist (1851–1923); Fritz Karl Bessel-Hagen, physician (1856–1945); Werner Hagen, diplomat (1864–1921)
- Parent: Carl Heinrich Hagen

Adolf Hermann Wilhelm Hagen (23 September 1820 – 17 August 1894) was a public official in Prussia. He was also a banker and a liberal politician.

He is known for the "Hagen resolution", presented in the Prussian House of Representatives in 1862, which triggered a general election and heralded the end of the so-called (and as matters turned out short-lived) New Era in Prussian politics.

== Early life ==
Adolf Hagen (in some sources Adolph Hagen) was born into a leading family of successful intellectuals in Königsberg, the principal city in what was then East Prussia. His father was Carl Heinrich Hagen, a leading lawyer, socio-economist and senior government official. An uncle was the pioneering professor for Art history and Aesthetics, Ernst August Hagen. The chemist Karl Gottfried Hagen was his grandfather.

== Career ==
Hagen studied jurisprudence at Königsberg and then, in 1843, entered into public service in Königsberg. In 1854 he became "city treasurer" (Stadtkämmerer) for Berlin and a salaried councillor, positions he retained, following re-election in 1866, till 1871. He then switched his principal focus into the private sector, taking a directorship with the Deutsche Unionbank, and was involved in the creation of several public companies. After the bank was dissolved he returned to civic duties, and in 1876 became a Berlin alderman.

In Königsberg he was elected a local administrator (Landrat) in 1856, and during the 1860s he was three times elected Lord Mayor of Königsberg. However, the government in Berlin refused to confirm the election results and he was accordingly prevented from taking up the offices. Between 1862 and 1876 he sat as a member of the Prussian House of Representatives (Preußisches Abgeordnetenhaus) where he represented the newly formed Progressive Party (Deutsche Fortschrittspartei/ DFP).

Shortly after his election to the House of Representatives, in 1862 he presented a plenary resolution on the contentious issue of Prussia's military budget. The background was the rejection, by the Progressive Party which Hagen represented, of increased financial provision for army reform. Hagen's motion called for a binding obligation on government to provide a breakdown of state budgets. The motion gained support from members the larger Liberal and Catholic parties, and was passed by the assembly. The king was enraged and threatened to abdicate. The finance minister Robert von Patow agreed with the sense of the Hagen Resolution, but resigned because he correctly concluded that the government had lost the confidence of the king. Leading Old Liberal ministers followed von Patow's example and the government collapsed. The king appointed new ministers who were closer politically to his own conservative preferences, but who were unable to command a majority in the assembly. The crisis escalated till September 1862 when the king appointed Otto von Bismarck to head the government. Bismarck accepted the appointment only on condition that he was also appointed to the position of Foreign Minister. Despite the king's misgivings, which were shared by many in the political establishment, Bismarck proved a formidable political fixer, while Adolf Hagen has gone down in history as the man whose plenary resolution paved the way for the Prussian Constitutional Crisis and the Bismarck era.

Between 1867 and 1877 Hagen was also a member of the German Reichstag. After that he retired from politics. In 1871 he was awarded the honorific title Stadtältester von Berlin in recognition of his public service to the city.

== Personal life ==
Adolf Hagen's first marriage was to his cousin, Johanna Louise Amalie Bessel (1826–1856), daughter of the astronomer-mathematician Friedrich Bessel. He married secondly Anna Claussen (1831–1905). His children included:

- Ernst Bessel Hagen, physicist (1851-1923)
- Fritz Karl Bessel-Hagen, physician (1856-1945)
- Werner Hagen, diplomat (1864–1921)
