= Otto Wiener =

Otto Wiener may refer to:

- Otto Wiener (baritone)
- Otto Wiener (physicist)
