= Hagen–Rubens relation =

Formula in optics

In optics, the Hagen–Rubens relation (or Hagen–Rubens formula) is a relation between the coefficient of reflection and the conductivity for materials that are good conductors. The relation states that for solids where the contribution of the dielectric constant to the index of refraction is negligible, the reflection coefficient can be written as (in SI Units):

$$R\approx1-2\sqrt{\frac{2\epsilon_0\omega}{\sigma}}$$

where $\omega$ is the frequency of observation, $\sigma$ is the conductivity, and $\epsilon_0$ is the vacuum permittivity. For metals, this relation holds for frequencies (much) smaller than the Drude relaxation rate, and in this case the otherwise frequency-dependent conductivity $\sigma$ can be assumed frequency-independent and equal to the dc conductivity.

The relation is named after German physicists Ernst Bessel Hagen and Heinrich Rubens who discovered it in 1903.
