= Wilhelm Hallwachs =

German physicist

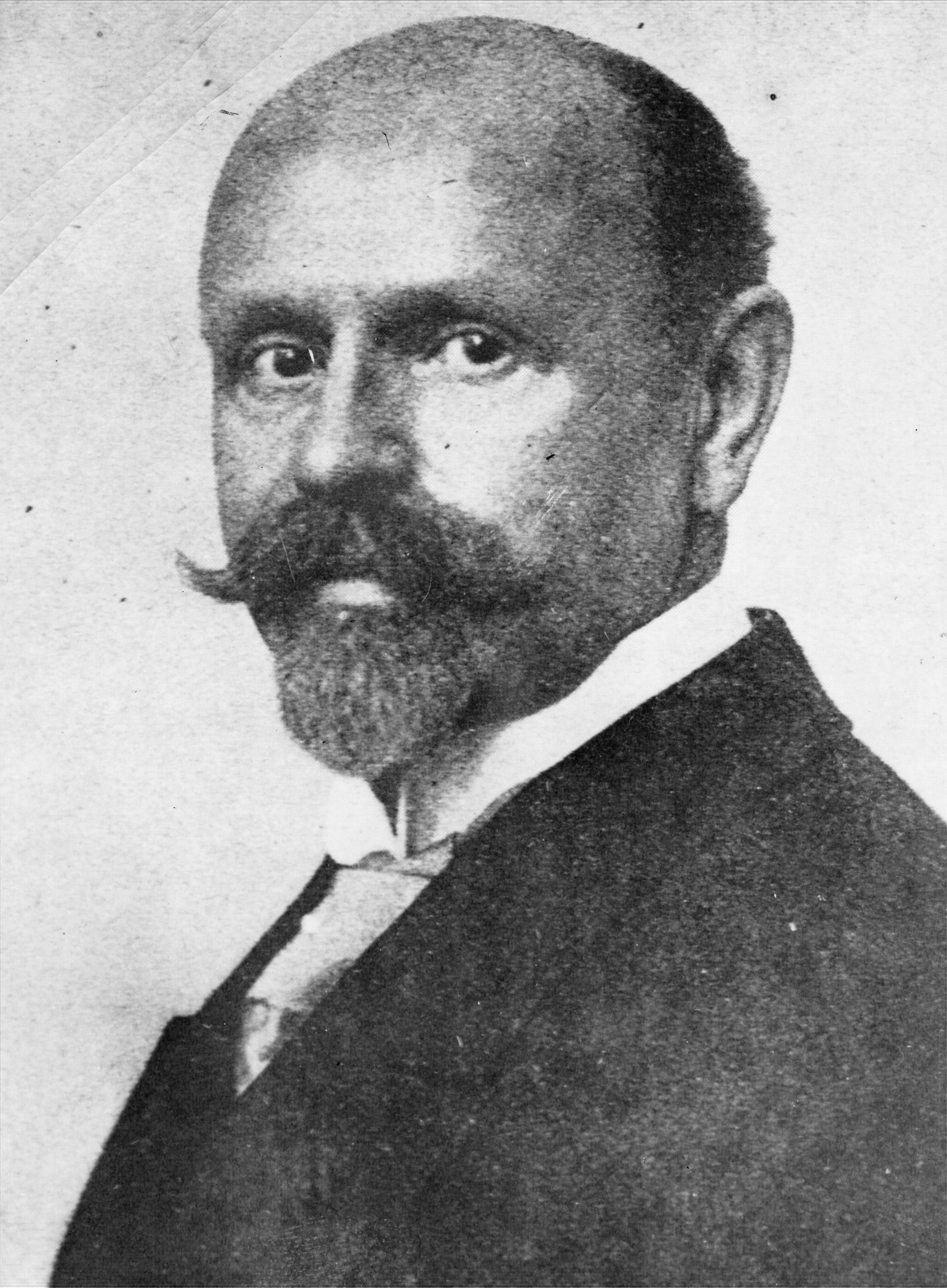
- Born: Wilhelm Ludwig Franz Hallwachs; 9 July 1859; Darmstadt, Grand Duchy of Hesse
- Died: 20 June 1922 (aged 62); Dresden, Germany
- Education: University of Strasbourg; University of Berlin
- Known for: Photoelectric effect
- Scientific career
- Fields: Physics; Electronic Engineering
- Workplaces: University of Würzburg; University of Leipzig; Dresden University of Technology
- Doctoral advisor: August Kundt

Wilhelm Ludwig Franz Hallwachs (9 July 1859 – 20 June 1922) was a German physicist. He is known for the discovery of the photoelectric effect in collaboration with Heinrich Hertz.

== Life and career ==
=== Early years ===
Hallwachs was born in 1859 in Darmstadt to Ludwig and Emilie Hallwachs. His father was a high ranking public official (Geheimer Staatsrat) with the Ministry of the Interior and Justice of the Grand Duchy of Hesse, then part of the German Confederation.

=== Career ===
From 1878 Hallwachs studied physics, most of his time at the University of Strasbourg, then part of Germany he also did one year at the University of Berlin. At last he was an assistant to August Kundt at Strasbourg where he was awarded a doctorate in 1893.

Hallwachs moved on to become an assistant to Friedrich Kohlrausch at the University of Würzburg where he stayed there from 1884 until 1886. In 1886, he went to Leipzig where he habilitated with Gustav Heinrich Wiedemann until 1888. After that he followed Friedrich Kohlrausch in Strasbourg.

Hallwachs became a professor at the Dresden University of Technology in 1893, originally for electrical engineering until he succeeded August Toepler in 1900 as a professor for physics. In 1921/22 Hallwachs was rector of the university.

=== Private life ===
In 1890 Hallwachs married Marie Kohlrausch, the daughter of Professor Friedrich Kohlrausch; he was an assistant with her in Würzburg.

== Scientific work ==
Hallwachs was a known as a builder of scientific instruments. Among the devices he invented are the electrometer quadrant and a double refractometer of great precision. Hallwachs was an assistant of Heinrich Hertz, in 1886, before the photoelectric effect was discovered. Hallwachs and Hertz, in 1887, carried on the investigations of electromagnetic waves. In 1888 Hallwachs formulated the hypothesis that a conductive plate on which to focus ultraviolet light carries a positive charge because the electrons are gouged out. This happened with more intensity in selenium. The phenomenon was seen in the same year by Augusto Righii. The phenomenon was called the Hallwachs effect (German: Hallwachs-Effekt), now called the photoelectric effect. The investigation of the photoelectric effect laid the foundation for the development of the photoelectric cell, photo electricity and Albert Einstein's quantum light hypothesis.

== Works ==
- The light electricity. In: manual of Radiology, Volume 3, Leipzig 1916, pp. 245–563.

== See also ==
- Timeline of solar cells
