= Kundt's tube =

Experimental acoustical apparatus

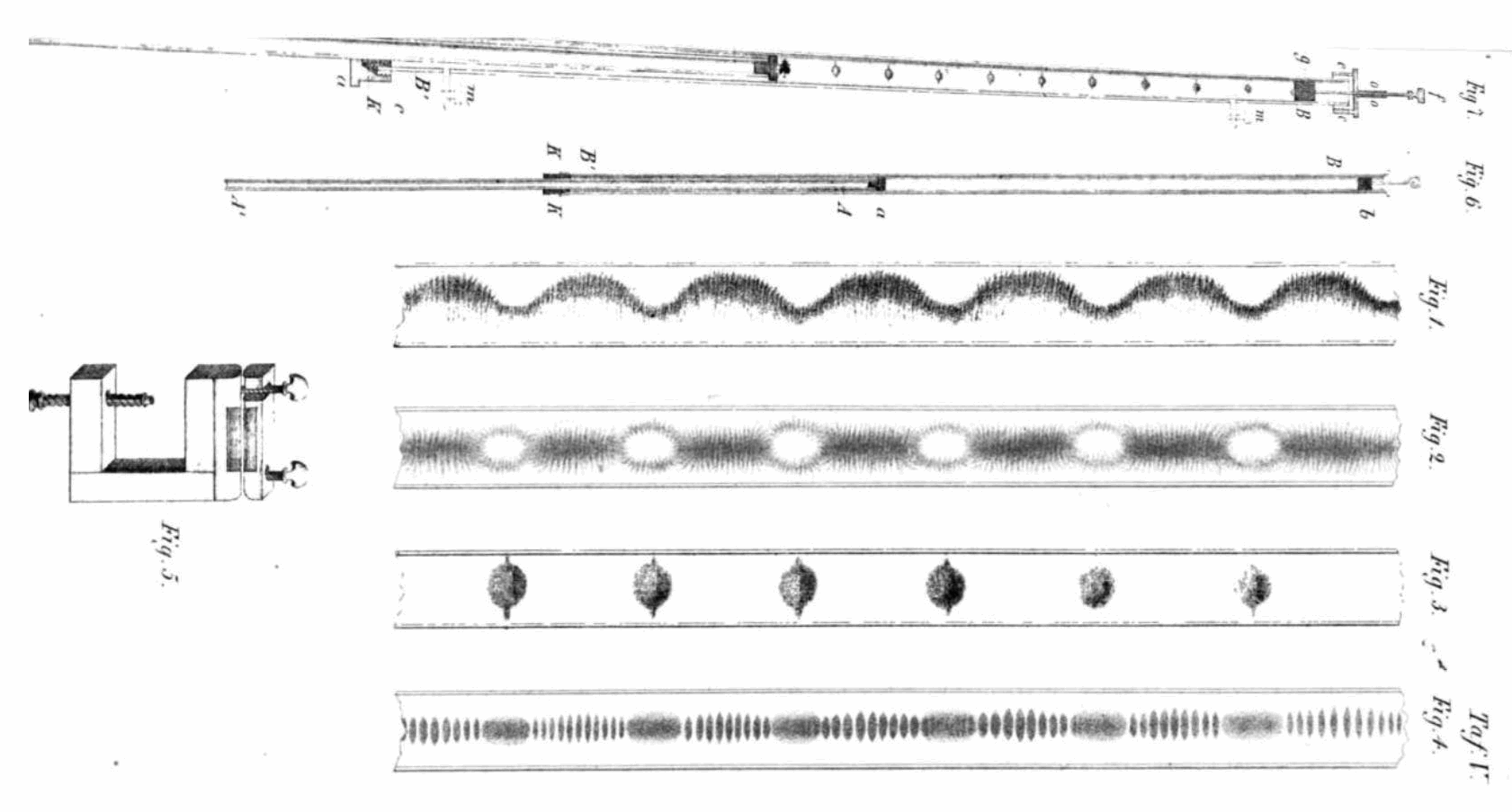
Drawing from Kundt's original 1866 paper in Annalen der Physik, showing the Kundt's tube apparatus (fig.6 & 7, top) and the powder patterns created by it (fig.1, 2, 3, 4)

Kundt's tube is an experimental acoustical apparatus invented in 1866 by German physicist August Kundt for the measurement of the speed of sound in a gas or a solid rod. The experiment is still taught today due to its ability to demonstrate longitudinal waves in a gas (which can often be difficult to visualise). It is used today only for demonstrating standing waves and acoustical forces.

== How it works ==
The tube is a transparent horizontal pipe which contains a small amount of a fine powder such as cork dust, talc or lycopodium. At one end of the tube is a source of sound at a single frequency (a pure tone). Kundt used a metal rod resonator that he caused to vibrate or 'ring' by rubbing it, but modern demonstrations usually use a loudspeaker attached to a signal generator producing a sine wave. The other end of the tube is blocked by a movable piston which can be used to adjust the length of the tube.

The sound generator is turned on and the piston is adjusted until the sound from the tube suddenly gets much louder. This indicates that the tube is at resonance. This means the length of the round-trip path of the sound waves, from one end of the tube to the other and back again, is a multiple of the wavelength λ of the sound waves. Therefore, the length of the tube is a multiple of half a wavelength. At this point, the sound waves in the tube are in the form of standing waves, and the amplitude of vibrations of air is zero at equally spaced intervals along the tube, called the nodes. The powder is caught up in the moving air and settles in little piles or lines at these nodes, because the air is still and quiet there. The distance between the piles is one half wavelength λ/2 of the sound. By measuring the distance between the piles, the wavelength λ of the sound in air can be found. If the frequency f of the sound is known, multiplying it by the wavelength gives the speed of sound c in the air:

$$c = \lambda f \,$$

The detailed motion of the powder is actually due to an effect called acoustic streaming caused by the interaction of the sound wave with the boundary layer of air at the surface of the tube.

== Further experiments ==
By filling the tube with other gases besides air, and partially evacuating it with a vacuum pump, Kundt was also able to calculate the speed of sound in different gases at different pressures. To create his vibrations, Kundt stopped the other end of the tube with a loose-fitting stopper attached to the end of a metal rod projecting into the tube, clamped at its center. When it was rubbed lengthwise with a piece of leather coated with rosin, the rod vibrated longitudinally at its fundamental frequency, giving out a high note. Once the speed of sound in the air was known, this allowed Kundt to calculate the speed of sound in the metal of the resonator rod. The length of the rod L was equal to a half wavelength of the sound in metal, and the distance between the piles of powder d was equal to a half wavelength of the sound in air. So the ratio of the two was equal to the ratio of the speed of sound in the two materials:

$$\frac {c_\text{metal}}{c_\text{air}} = \frac {f \lambda_\text{metal}}{f \lambda_\text{air}} = \frac {\lambda_\text{metal}}{\lambda_\text{air}} = \frac {L}{d}\,$$

== Reason for accuracy ==
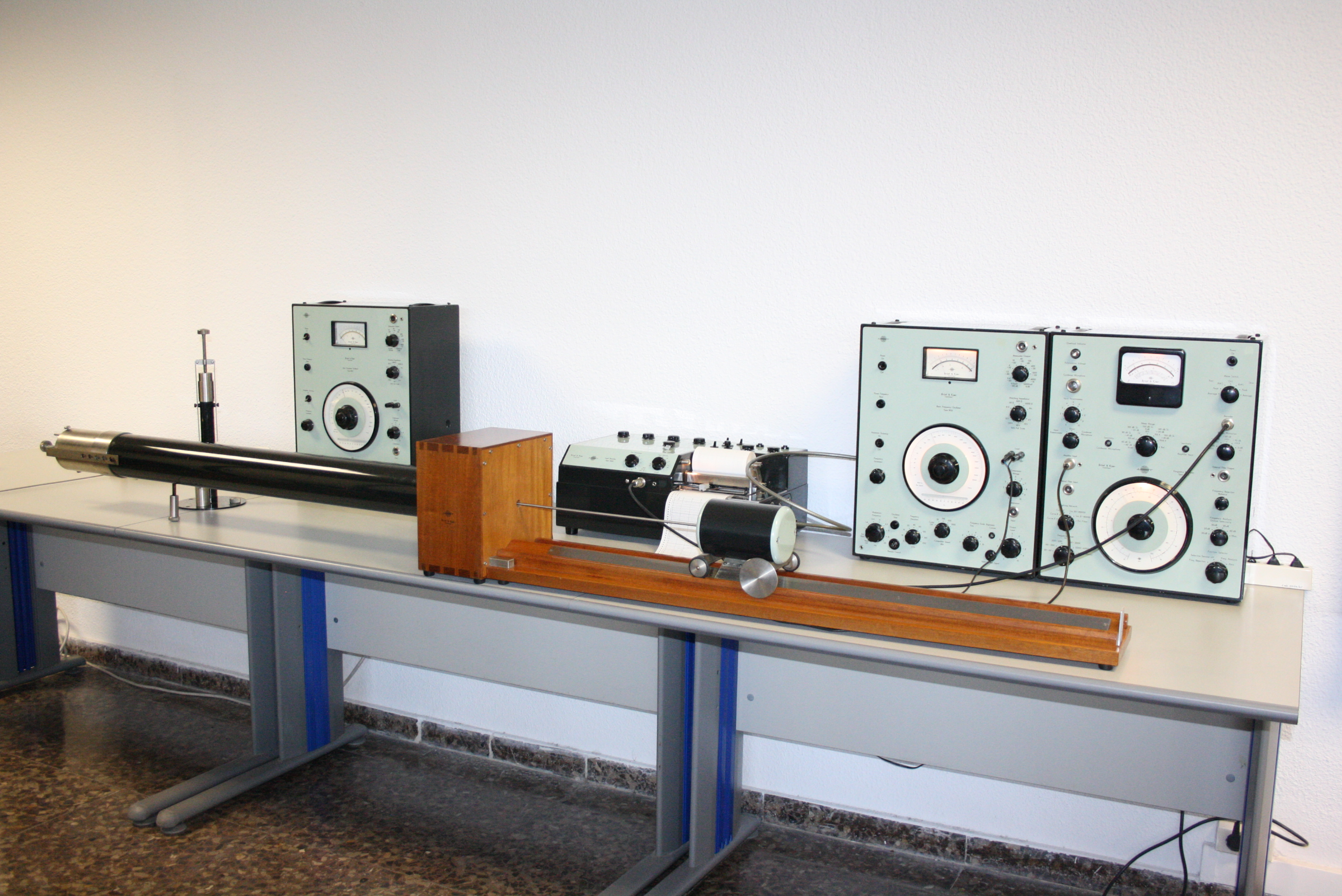
A modern version of Kundt's tube experiment, used in a South American university physics class. Instead of a transparent tube with powder in it to reveal the nodes, this uses microphones mounted in the tube. The piston (right center) is moved back and forth. When the microphone's position is at the nodes of the wave the sound pressure goes to zero. The sound power from the microphones is recorded on the chart recorder (center rear).

A less accurate method of determining wavelength with a tube, used before Kundt, is simply to measure the length of the tube at resonance, which is approximately equal to a multiple of a half wavelength. The problem with this method is that when a tube of air is driven by a sound source, its length at resonance is not exactly equal to a multiple of the half-wavelength. Because the air at the source end of the tube, next to the speaker's diaphragm, is vibrating, it is not exactly at a node (point of zero amplitude) of the standing wave. The node actually occurs some distance beyond the end of the tube. Kundt's method allowed the actual locations of the nodes to be determined with great accuracy.

== See also ==
- Chladni plates, another standing wave visualization technique.
- Rubens tube, demonstrates the relationship between standing sound waves and sound pressure.
