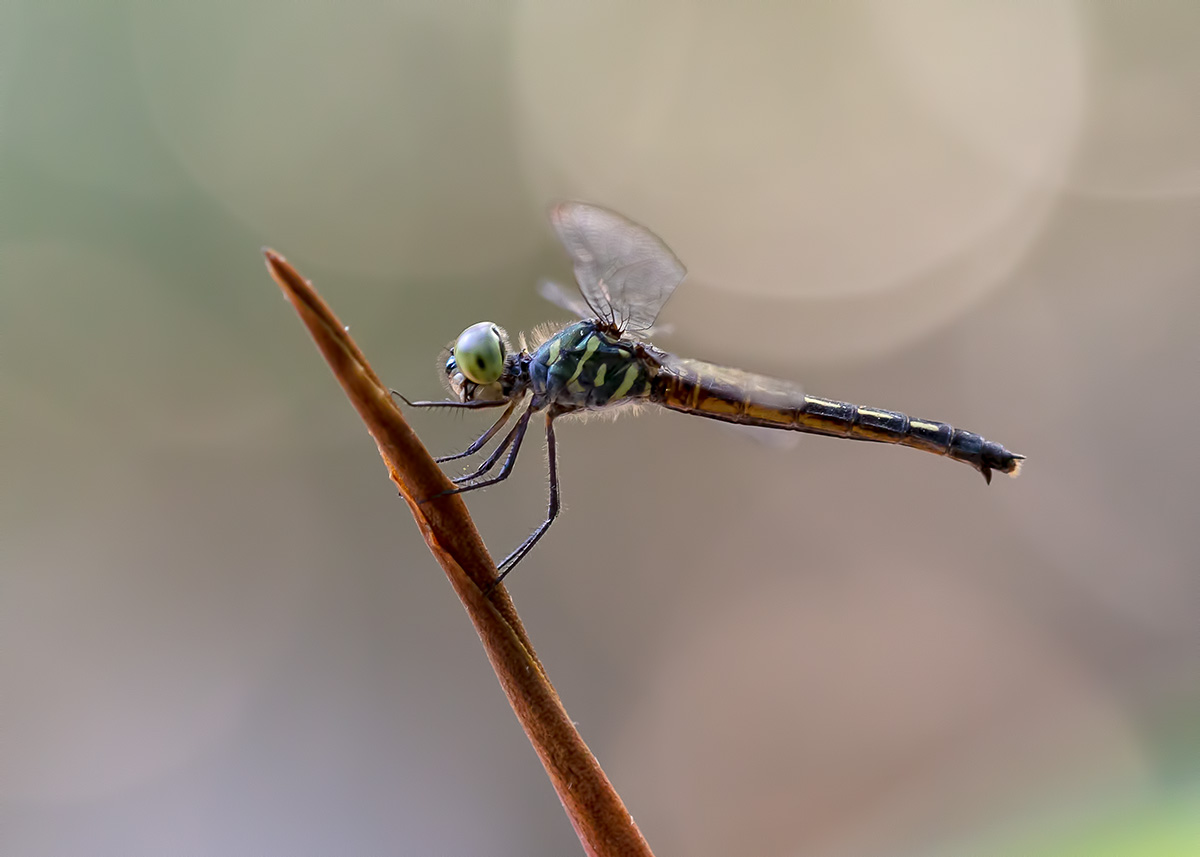
- Raphismia bispina

Scientific classification
- Kingdom: Animalia
- Phylum: Arthropoda
- Clade: Pancrustacea
- Class: Insecta
- Order: Odonata
- Infraorder: Anisoptera
- Family: Libellulidae
- Subfamily: Brachydiplacinae
- Genus: Raphismia; Kirby, 1889

= Raphismia =

Genus of dragonflies

Raphismia is a genus of dragonfly in the family Libellulidae, found across Southeast Asia to Australia. One species, Raphismia bispina is a small dragonfly found in mangrove swamps.

== Etymology ==
The genus name Raphismia is derived from the Greek ῥαφίς (rhaphis, "needle"), referring to the two small spines on the lower thorax of the male.

== Species ==
The genus Raphismia includes two species:

Male	Female	Scientific name	Common name	Distribution
		Raphismia bispina (Hagen, 1867)	spiny-chested percher	Malaysia, Philippines, Indonesia, New Guinea, and Australia.
		Raphismia inermis Ris, 1910		Indonesia

== See also ==
- List of Odonata species of Australia
