= Emil Cohn =

German physicist

- Born: 28 August 1854; Neustrelitz, Mecklenburg
- Died: 28 January 1944 (aged 89); Ringgenberg, Switzerland
- Education: University of Strasbourg
- Known for: theoretical electromagnetism
- Scientific career
- Fields: Physicist
- Workplaces: University of Freiburg
- Doctoral advisor: August Kundt

Emil Georg Cohn (28 September 1854 – 28 January 1944), was a German physicist.

== Life ==
Cohn was born in Neustrelitz, Mecklenburg on 28 September 1854. He was the son of August Cohn, a lawyer, and Charlotte Cohn. At the age of 17, Cohn began to study jurisprudence at the University of Leipzig. However, at the Ruprecht Karl University of Heidelberg and the University of Strasbourg he began to study physics. In Strasbourg, he graduated in 1879. From 1881 to 1884, he was an assistant of August Kundt at the physical institute. In 1884 he habilitated in theoretical physics and was admitted as a private lecturer. From 1884 to 1918, he was a faculty member of the University of Strasbourg and was nominated as an assistant professor on 27 September 1884. He dealt with experimental physics at first, and then turned completely to theoretical physics. In 1918 he was nominated as an extraordinary professor.

After the end of World War I and the occupation of Alsace-Lorraine by France, Cohn and his family were expelled from Strasbourg on the Christmas Eve of 1918. In April 1919, he was nominated as a professor at the University of Rostock. From June 1920, he gave lectures about theoretical physics at the University of Freiburg. In 1935 he retired in Heidelberg where he lived until 1939. He resigned from the Deutsche Physikalische Gesellschaft (DPG) together with other physicists like Richard Gans, Leo Graetz, George Jaffé, Walter Kaufmann, in protest at the despotism of the Nazi regime.

Cohn was a baptized Protestant and was married with Marie Goldschmidt (1864–1950), with whom he had two daughters. Because of his Jewish descent he found himself forced to emigrate to Switzerland because of the pressure under the Nazi regime. He lived in Hasliberg-Hohfluh at first, and from 1942 in Ringgenberg, Switzerland, where he died at the age of 90.

Cohn's younger brother, Carl Cohn (1857–1931) was a successful overseas merchant from Hamburg, who worked from 1921 until 1929 as a senator in Hamburg.

== Work ==
At the beginning of the 20th century, Cohn was one of the most respectable experts in the area of theoretical electrodynamics. He was unsatisfied with the Lorentzian theory of electrodynamics for moving bodies and proposed an independent theory. His alternative theory, which was based on a modification of the Maxwell field-equations, was compatible to all relevant electrodynamic and optical experiments known at that time (1900–1904), including the Michelson–Morley experiment (MMX) of 1887. Cohn's electrodynamics of moving bodies was based on the assumption that light travels within the Earth's atmosphere with a constant velocity - however, his theory suffered from internal failures. While the theory predicted the negative result of MMX within air, a positive result would be expected within vacuum. Another weak point stems from the fact, that his concept was formulated without the use of atoms and electrons. So after 1905 his theory was superseded by Hendrik Lorentz's and Albert Einstein's.

Regarding his own theory (developed in 1900 and 1901), he used the Principle of Economy to eliminate the known concept of luminiferous aether (but also the concept of atoms) and argued that one can simply call it vacuum. He also maintained that one can use a frame of reference in which the fixed stars are at rest. As a heuristic concept this can be described as a material "aether", but in Cohn's opinion this would be only "metaphorical" and would not affect the consequences of his theory. He also incorporated the transformation equations x'=x-vt and t'=t-vx/c² introduced by Lorentz in 1895 into his theory, calling them the "Lorentzian Transformation" (German: Lorentz'sche Transformation). In 1905 this name (for transformations valid to all orders in v/c) was altered by Henri Poincaré into the commonly used expression "Lorentz transformation".

In 1904 he compared his theory with Lorentz's mature 1904 theory, employing physical interpretations of the Lorentz transformation that were similar to those later used in Albert Einstein's special relativity in 1905. For instance, local time was described by him as a consequence of the assumption that light propagates in spherical waves with constant velocity in all directions (a similar definition was already given by Poincaré in 1900).

Everywhere, where the propagation of radiation is not the object of measurement, we define identical moments of time at different points of Earth's surface, by treating the propagation of light as timeless. In optics, however, we define these identical moments of time by assuming, that the propagation takes place in spherical waves for every relatively resting and isotropic medium. This means: the "time" which actually serves us for the representation of terrestrial processes, is the "local time" $t'$, for which the equations I'b to IVb hold, – not the "general time" $t$.

— Emil Cohn, 1904

He also illustrated the effects of length contraction and time dilation by using moving rods and clocks.

$x_0\ y_0\ z_0$ are those measuring numbers being read at an "initially correct" measuring-rod (initially = when at rest), after it was introduced into the system and was accordingly deformed. [...] $t_0$ are those time intervals indicated by an "initially correctly ticking" clock, after it was inserted into the system and accordingly has changed its rate.

— Emil Cohn, 1904

He critically remarked that the distinction between "true time" and "local time" in Lorentz's theory is artificial, because it cannot be verified by experiment. However, Cohn himself believed that the validity of Lorentz's theory is limited to optical phenomena, whereas in his own theory it is possible that mechanical clocks might indicate the "true" time. Later in 1911 (after his own theory was disproved), Cohn accepted the relativity principle of "Lorentz and Einstein" and wrote a summary on special relativity, which was applauded by Einstein.

== Publications ==
- Cohn, E. (1900). Das Elektromagnetische Feld - Vorlesungen über die Maxwell'sche Theorie. Leipzig: S. Hirzel.; Second edition Berlin 1927: Das elektromagnetische Feld - Ein Lehrbuch
- Cohn, E. (1900). "Über die Gleichungen der Electrodynamik für bewegte Körper". Recueil de travaux offerts par les auteurs à H. A. Lorentz à l'occasion du 25ème anniversaire de son doctorat le 11 décembre 1900, Archives néerlandaises. 5: 516–523.
- Cohn, E. (1901). "Über die Gleichungen des elektromagnetischen Feldes für bewegte Körper". Göttinger Nachrichten: 74–99.
- Cohn, E. (1901). "Ueber die Gleichungen des elektromagnetischen Feldes für bewegte Körper". Annalen der Physik. 312 (1): 29–56. Bibcode:1901AnP...312...29C. doi:10.1002/andp.19013120103.
- Cohn, E. (1904). "Zur Elektrodynamik bewegter Systeme I". Sitzungsberichte der Königlich Preussischen Akademie der Wissenschaften. 1904 (40): 1294–1303.

- Wikisource translation: On the Electrodynamics of Moving Systems I

- Cohn, E. (1904). "Zur Elektrodynamik bewegter Systeme II". Sitzungsberichte der Königlich Preussischen Akademie der Wissenschaften. 1904 (43): 1404–1416.

- Wikisource translation: On the Electrodynamics of Moving Systems II

- Cohn, E (1904). "Antikritisches zu Hrn. Wiens "Differentialgleichungen der Elektrodynamic für bewegte Körper"". Annalen der Physik. 14 (6): 208. Bibcode:1904AnP...319..208C. doi:10.1002/andp.19043190619.
- "Physikalisches über Raum und Zeit", Himmel und Erde XIII, 117–136 (1911); auch als Broschüre veröffentlicht: Physikalisches über Raum und Zeit, Berlin/Leipzig 1920, 4. Auflage (30 S.).
- "Faraday und Maxwell", Deutsches Museum - Abhandlungen und Berichte 4 (1), Berlin 1932 (29 S.).
