= Albert John Cook =

American entomologist

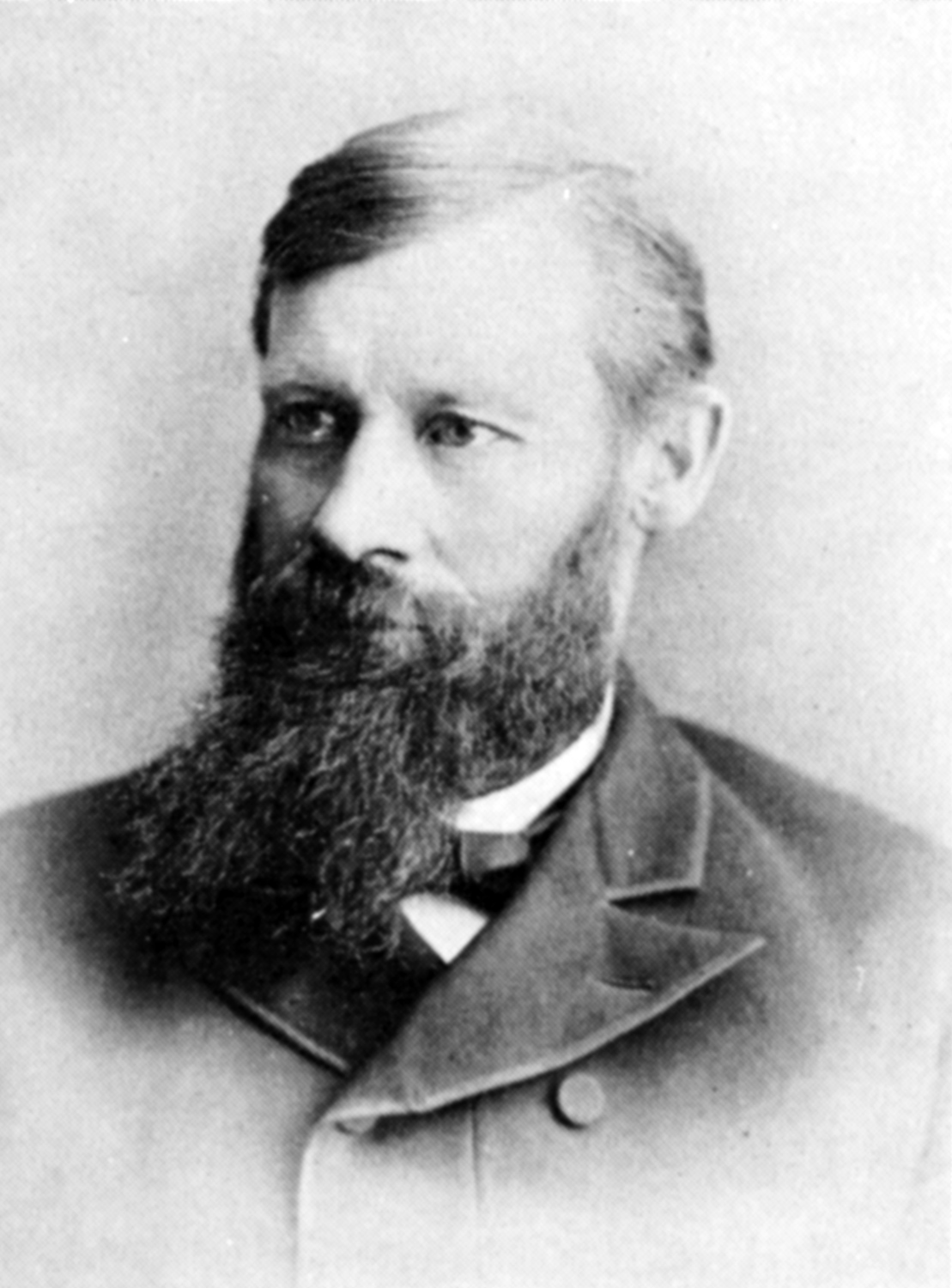
Albert John Cook

Albert John Cook (August 30, 1842 – September 29, 1916) was an American economic entomologist and educator. He was influential in the development of entomology in Michigan and California. Cook taught one of the first formal courses in entomology in the United States.

== Biography ==
Cook was born in Owosso, Michigan on August 30, 1842. He studied agriculture and biology at the (Michigan) State Agricultural College (now Michigan State University), and graduated in 1862. He received a masters degree two years later and then continued his graduate studies at Harvard under the tutelage of Louis Agassiz and Hermann August Hagen.

In 1862 he returned to his alma mater, teaching mathematics and a half-year course in entomology, one of the earliest formal courses offered in the United States. In 1867 he established the Collection of Insects at the College. In 1869 he became a professor of zoology and entomology.

While at State Agricultural College, he was extensively involved in beekeeping. He lectured on apiculture and in 1876 published a pamphlet called The Manual of the Apiary, which was eventually expanded into a textbook that went through at least seventeen editions.

He also spent many years in California teaching at Pomona College from 1894 to 1911 and after this headed California's Commission of Horticulture.

He died in his childhood home on September 29, 1916.

== Works ==
- Manual of the apiary. Chicago: Newman & Son (1880).
- Wintering bees. Lansing: Agricultural College of Michigan (1885).
- Report of apicultural experiments in 1891. (1892).
- The Bee-Keeper's Guide; or Manual of the Apiary. (17th ed.) Chicago: Newman & Son (1902).

== Sources ==
- Crawford, David L. (1916). "Albert John Cook, DSC". Journal of Entomology and Zoology. 8 (4). Pomona College Dept. of Zoology: 169–170.
- Mallis, Arnold (1971). American Entomologists. Rutgers University Press. pp. 138–141.
