= Reststrahlen effect =

Physical phenomenon

The Reststrahlen effect (German: “residual rays”) is a reflectance phenomenon in which electromagnetic radiation within a narrow energy band cannot propagate within a given medium due to a change in refractive index concurrent with the specific absorbance band of the medium in question; this narrow energy band is termed the Reststrahlen band.

As a result of this inability to propagate, normally incident Reststrahlen-band radiation experiences strong reflection or total reflection from that medium. The energies at which Reststrahlen bands occur vary and are particular to the individual compound. Numerous physical attributes of a compound will have an effect on the appearance of the Reststrahlen band. These include phonon band-gap, particle/grain size, strongly absorbing compounds, compounds with optically opaque bands in the infrared.

== Appearance ==
The term Reststrahlen was coined following the observation by Heinrich Rubens in 1898 that repeated reflection of an infrared beam at the surface of a given material suppresses radiation at all wavelengths except for certain spectral intervals, and Rubens detected wavelengths of sizes around 60 μm. The measured intensity for these special intervals (the Reststrahlen range) indicates a reflectance of up to 80% or even more, while the maximum reflectance due to infrared bands of dielectric materials are usually <10%. After four reflections, the intensity of the latter is reduced by a factor of 10^{−4} compared to the intensity of the incident radiation, while the light in the Reststrahlen range can maintain 40% of its original intensity by the time it reaches the detector. Obviously, this contrast increases with the number of reflections and explains the observation made by Rubens and the term Reststrahlen (residual rays) used to describe this spectral selection.

Reststrahlen bands manifest in diffuse reflectance infrared absorption spectra as complete band reversal, or in infrared emission spectra as a minimum in emissivity.

== Application ==
The Reststrahlen effect is used to investigate the properties of semiconductors, it is also used in geophysics and meteorology.

== See also ==
- Absorbance
- Ellipsometry
- Emissivity
- Transmittance
- Reflectivity
- Lyddane–Sachs–Teller relation
- Physical crystallography before X-rays
