= Heinrich Rubens =

German experimental physicist (1865–1922)

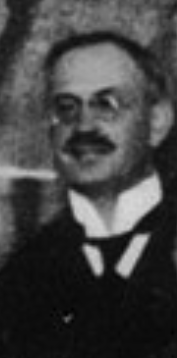
- Rubens in 1911
- Born: 30 March 1865; Wiesbaden, Duchy of Nassau, German Confederation
- Died: 17 July 1922 (aged 57); Berlin, Weimar Republic
- Resting place: Alter St.-Matthäus-Kirchhof, Berlin
- Education: University of Strassburg; University of Berlin (Dr. phil., Dr. habil.)
- Known for: Measuring black-body radiation (1900); Rubens tube (1905); Hagen–Rubens relation; Reststrahlen effect
- Awards: Rumford Medal (1910)
- Scientific career
- Fields: Acoustics; thermodynamics
- Workplaces: University of Berlin (1892–96, 1906–22); Technische Hochschule Berlin (1896–1906)
- Thesis: Die selective Reflexion der Metalle (The selective reflection of metals) (1889)
- Doctoral advisor: August Kundt
- Notable students: Gustav Hertz; Erich Kretschmann; Walter Schottky

Heinrich Rubens (German: [ˈhaɪnʁɪç ˈʁuːbənz]; 30 March 1865 – 17 July 1922) was a German experimental physicist known for his measurements of the energy of black-body radiation, which led Max Planck to the discovery of his radiation law. This was the genesis of quantum theory.

== Biography ==
After having attended realgymnasium Wöhlerschule in Frankfurt am Main, he started in 1884 to study electrical engineering at institutes of technology in Darmstadt and Berlin. The following year he switched to physics at the University of Berlin which was more to his liking. After just one semester there he transferred to Strasbourg. There he benefited much from the lectures by August Kundt who in 1888 took over the vacant position of Hermann von Helmholtz at the University of Berlin. Rubens followed after and got his doctoral degree there the same year. In the period 1890–1896, he was employed as an assistant at the physics institute and made his habilitation in 1892. He was then a privatdozent and was allowed to teach. Already then he was praised for his experimental investigations of infrared radiation.

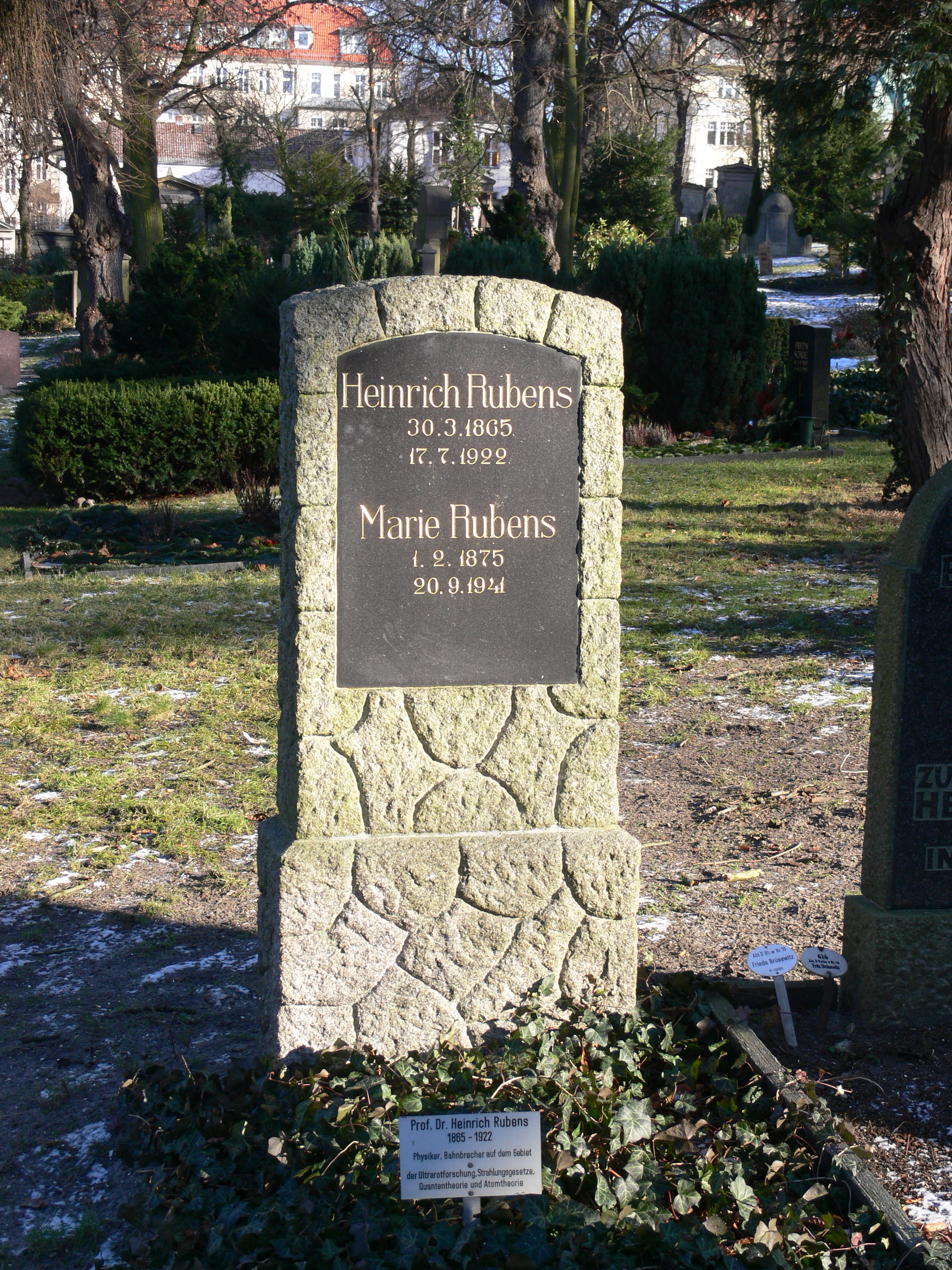
The grave of Heinrich and Marie Rubens in Berlin.

Rubens got a permanent position in 1896 as docent at the Technische Hochschule in Charlottenburg (now Technische Universität Berlin). He could continue his experimental research at the nearby Physikalisch-Technische Reichsanstalt. It was there he in 1900 did his important measurements of black-body radiation which made him world-famous. He was promoted to professor the same year.

After Paul Drude died in 1906 during his professorship at the University in Berlin, the position was given to Rubens. He was at the same time appointed director of the physics institute. In this way he could influence and lead a large group of colleagues and students. The year after he was elected to the Prussian Academy of Sciences and became in 1908 a corresponding member Göttingen Academy of Sciences and Humanities. He participated at the two first Solvay conferences after having received the Rumford Medal in 1910 "on the ground of his researches on radiation, especially of long wave length.".

Heinrich Rubens died in 1922 after a longer illness. At a memorial meeting in the science academy the following year Max Planck said about him:

Without the intervention of Rubens the formulation of the radiation law and thereby the foundation of quantum theory would perhaps have arisen in quite a different manner, or perhaps not have developed in Germany at all.

He is buried at the Alter St.-Matthäus-Kirchhof in Berlin-Schöneberg with his wife Marie. She took her life in 1941 for fear of being deported and killed by the Nazis. The burial place is near that of Gustav Kirchhoff, who founded spectroscopy and formulated the first laws of black-body radiation.

== Scientific contributions ==
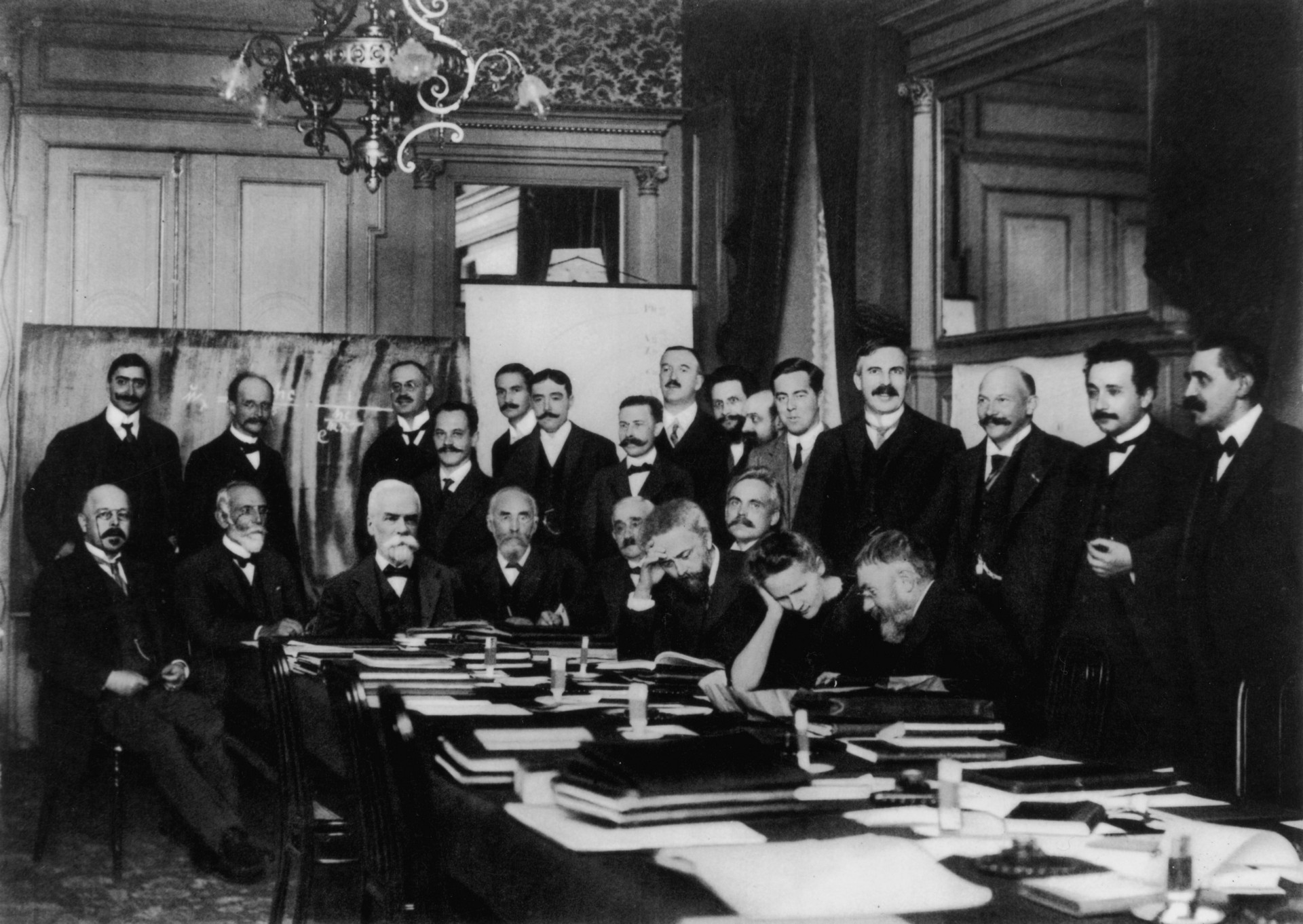
Participants at the first Solvay conference 1911. Rubens is the third person from left standing in the back.

Already as a student was Rubens fascinated by electromagnetic radiation as theoretically described by Maxwell and experimentally demonstrated by Hertz. Through the influence of Kundt he had become interested in understanding the optical properties of different materials. In his doctoral work he showed that reflection of light increases with increasing wavelengths into the infrared region. As a related result he could present an experimental verification of Maxwell's theory for electromagnetic waves in different media. This effort also turned into a demonstration of the validity of these equations for infrared radiation. Rubens succeeded in this for wavelengths up to 10 μm.

Through the improvements of instruments and invention of new techniques he could measure infrared radiation for larger and larger wavelengths. One of his goals was to better understand the reflexion of radiation by metals and crystals. It was known that this became stronger for wavelengths which were absorbed. This lead him to a new, powerful method by selective reflexion from several crystals to isolate a narrow range of infrared wavelengths from a broader spectrum of radiation. Using such Reststrahlen he could in 1898 detect wavelengths of sizes around 60 μm.

Together with Ferdinand Kurlbaum he started the same year to measure the energy content of black-body radiation in the far infrared region using this technique. For a fixed value of the wavelength they found that the energy increased linearly with the temperature. This was in disagreement with the ruling Wien's radiation law, but consistent with an alternative law proposed by Lord Rayleigh.

On 7 October 1900 Rubens and his wife were invited to dinner by Max Planck. Rubens told then his host about the new measurements done at a wavelength 51 μm. After the guests had left Planck managed to derive a new formula for the radiation energy which was consistent with the new results. He wrote it down on a postcard which Rubens received the following day. A few days later Rubens reported back that it seemed to fit all his measurements. On 14 December Planck could present to Deutsche Physikalische Gesellschaft a derivation of his new radiation law based on the idea of quantization of energy. This was the "birthday" of the new quantum physics.

In the following years Rubens could improve his measurements of infrared radiation and reached wavelengths of several hundred micrometres. This enabled him also to make more and more accurate tests of Plancks new radiation theory and related studies of matter which soon could be described by quantum mechanics. He was loved by his students and colleagues for his care and accuracy in all experimental work. In this connection he constructed in 1905 a Rubens tube to illustrate standing sound waves using a flammable gas in a tube. This was probably inspired by his teacher Kundt's tube where fine sand or powder was used for the same purpose.

== See also ==
- Physical crystallography before X-rays
