= August Kundt =

German physicist (1839–1894)

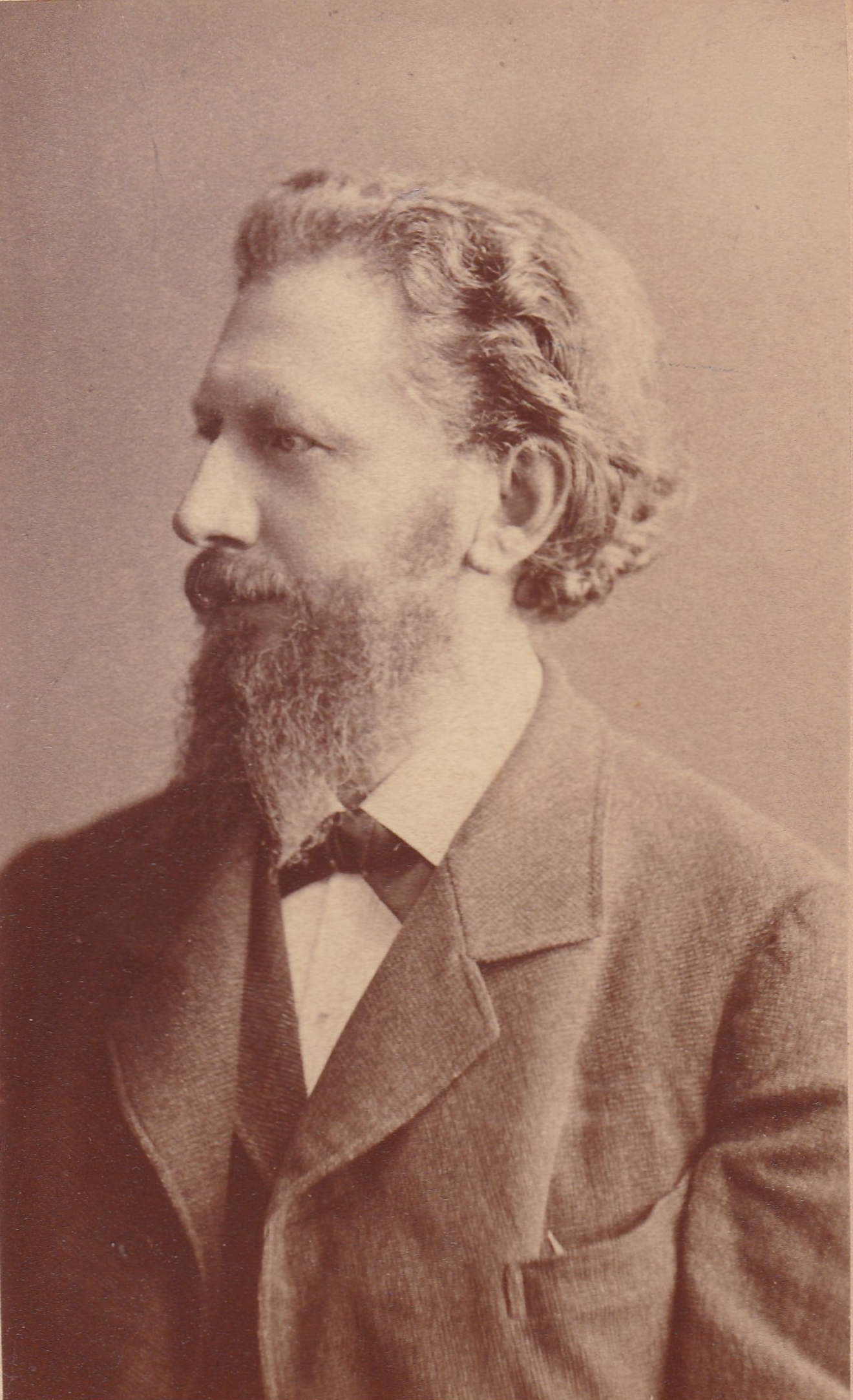
- Kundt, c. 1893
- Born: August Adolf Eduard Eberhard Kundt; 18 November 1839; Schwerin, Grand Duchy of Mecklenburg-Schwerin
- Died: 21 May 1894 (aged 54); Free City of Lübeck, German Empire
- Education: University of Berlin
- Known for: Kundt's tube Oppel–Kundt illusion
- Scientific career
- Fields: Physics
- Workplaces: University of Berlin (1867–68, 1888–94); Federal Polytechnic School (1868–72); University of Strassburg (1872–88)
- Doctoral advisor: Heinrich Magnus
- Doctoral students: See list: Ivan Puluj (1876); Heinrich Kayser (1879); Otto Wiener (1887); Friedrich Paschen (1889); Heinrich Rubens (1889); Pyotr Lebedev (1891); Wilhelm Hallwachs (1893); Hermann Theodor Simon (1894)
- Other notable students: See list: Knut Ångström; Emil Cohn; Franz Exner; Wilhelm Röntgen; Emil Warburg; Arthur Webster; Max Wien

August Adolf Eduard Eberhard Kundt (German: [ˈaʊɡʊst ˈkʊnt]; 18 November 1839 – 21 May 1894) was a German physicist known for developing Kundt's tube, an apparatus used to measure the speed of sound in gases and solids.

== Education and career ==
August Adolf Eduard Eberhard Kundt was born on 18 November 1839 in Schwerin, Mecklenburg. He began his scientific studies at the University of Leipzig, but afterwards went to the University of Berlin. At first, he devoted himself to astronomy, but after coming under the influence of Heinrich Magnus, he turned his attention to physics, and graduated in 1864 with a thesis on the depolarization of light.

In 1867, Kundt became a Privatdozent at Berlin, and the following year he was appointed Professor of Physics at the Federal Polytechnic Institute in Zurich (now ETH Zurich), where he was the teacher of Wilhelm Röntgen. In 1872, he was called to the newly re-established University of Strassburg, where he took a great part in its organization, and was largely concerned in the erection of the Physical Institute.

In 1888, Kundt returned to Berlin as successor to Hermann von Helmholtz in the Chair of Experimental Physics and the Directorship of the Berlin Physical Institute.

Kundt died from a protracted illness on 21 May 1894 in Israelsdorf, near Lübeck, at the age of 54.

== Research ==
As an original worker, Kundt was especially successful in the domains of sound and light. In 1866, he developed a valuable method for the investigation of aerial waves within pipes, based on the fact that a finely divided powder, lycopodium for example, when dusted over the interior of a tube in which is established a vibrating column of air, tends to collect in heaps at the nodes, the distance between which can thus be ascertained. An extension of the method renders possible the determination of the velocity of sound in different gases. This experimental apparatus is called a Kundt's tube.

In 1876, at Strasbourg in collaboration with Emil Warburg, Kundt proved that mercury vapour is a monatomic gas. In light, Kundt's name is widely known for his inquiries in anomalous dispersion, not only in liquids and vapours, but even in metals, which he obtained in very thin films by means of a laborious process of electrolytic deposition upon platinized glass.

Kundt also carried out many experiments in magneto-optics, and succeeded in showing what Faraday had failed to detect, the rotation under the influence of magnetic force of the plane of polarization in certain gases and vapours.

Work was performed by Kundt on plant physiology and chlorophyll light frequencies absorption (Kundt's rule), centred on wavelengths of 6800 Å. This work may or may not have been complementary to E. Warburg work and theories. It was subsequently refined and expanded by R. Houston and O. Biermacher and others.
