= Oppel–Kundt illusion =

Geometric illusion with graphic implementations

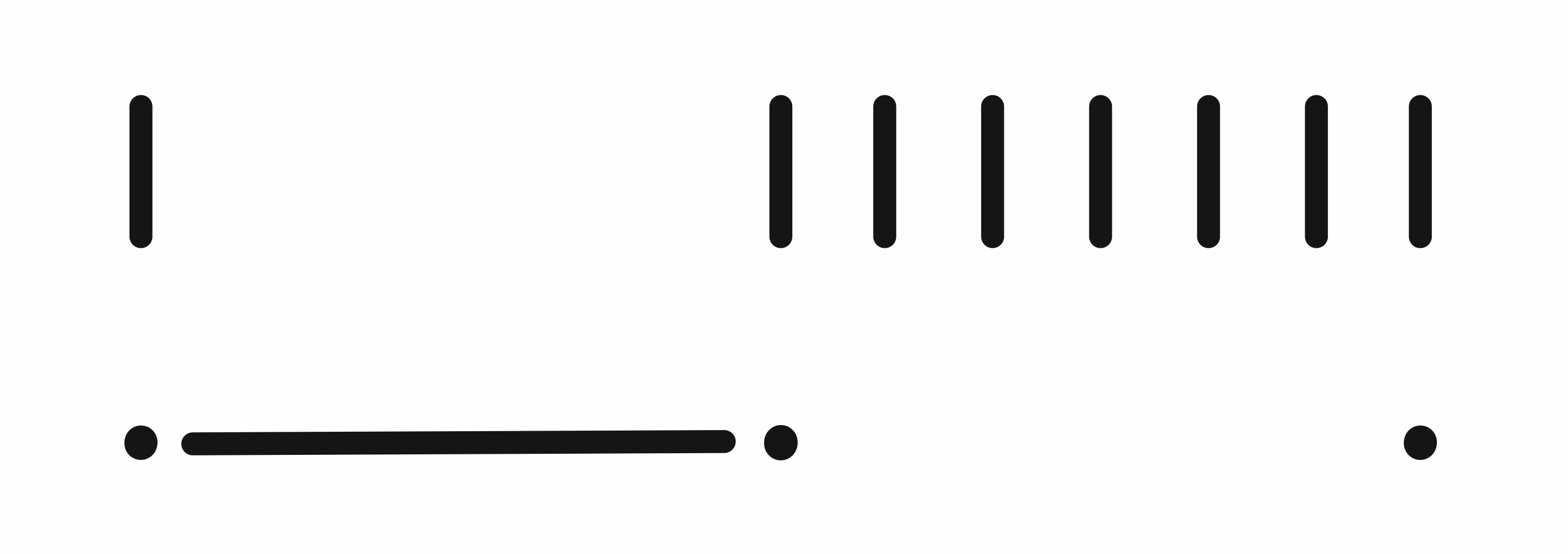
The part of the figure filled with some elements (upper, discretely; lower, continuously) seems longer than the unfilled part of the same length

The Oppel–Kundt illusion is a geometric optical illusion that occurs when comparing the sizes of filled (with some visual elements, distractors) and unfilled parts of the image (for most observers, the filled part seems larger). The illusion is named after German physicists Johann Joseph Oppel (first mentioned this phenomenon in 1860) and August Kundt (first performed a systematic study of the illusion in 1863). It is also known as the "filled-space illusion" or the "illusion of interrupted extent". Depending on the filling elements used, there is a wide variety of graphic implementations of the Oppel–Kundt illusion, which also differ in the magnitude of the visual distortion effects they cause.

== Explanations ==
Although various modifications of the Oppel–Kundt illusion have been studied experimentally quite well, there is still no generally accepted explanation for the occurrence of this visual phenomenon.

- Along with purely phenomenological modeling a number of different theoretical approaches have been tested to account for the data obtained in psychophysical experiments. For example, the methods of the potential theory in physics were used to explain the illusion by interactions between different elements of stimulus in a two-dimensional perceptual field.
- According to a different (more physiological) approach, the illusion may be associated with the perception of continuity of the filled part of the stimulus. It was assumed that individual filling elements cause neural activation in the corresponding spatiotemporal windows, and these windows (if they overlap) merge into a continuous array of "associated fields" of excitation.
- According to the "contour density" hypothesis, the number of zero crossings of the spatial profile of neural activity caused by the filled part of the Oppel–Kundt figure may be one of the most important factors determining the illusion magnitude.

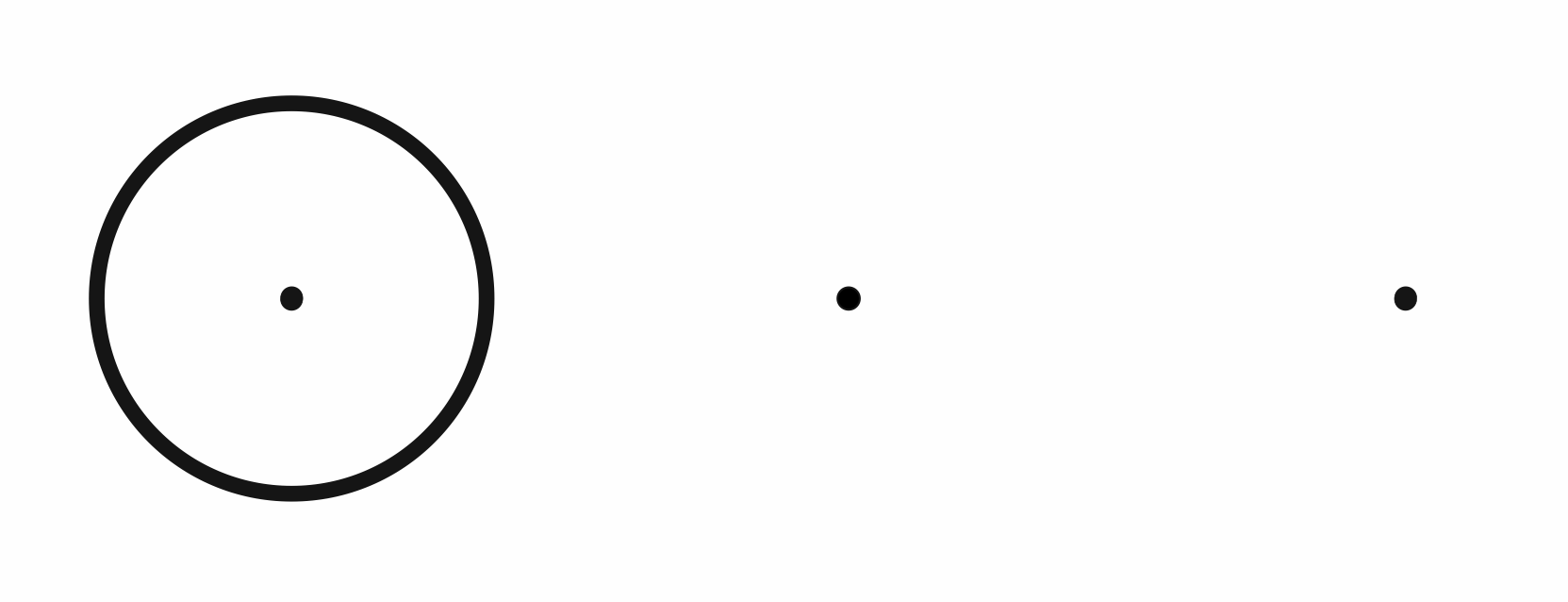
A spatial interval with a circle seems longer than an empty interval of the same length

- A fairly adequate description of the effects of the illusion was obtained from a computational model that seeks to explain the misperception of extent in terms of physiological spatial-frequency filtering, as well as using a quantitative approach that explains the appearance of the illusion by internal noise in neural networks.
- According to the "spatial coding" model, the Oppel–Kundt illusion can be associated with misjudgments of the visual positions of stimuli terminators (items designating the ends of spatial intervals). It is assumed that the eccentricity (angular distance from the center of field of view) of the terminator is encoded by the magnitude of the cumulative neural response of some hypothetical area of weighted spatial summation (AWS, centered on the terminator), which size scales linearly towards the visual periphery. That is, a terminator with a more peripheral location affects overlapping receptive fields of neuronal populations with a wider aggregated profile, thus causing a greater integrated response of the corresponding AWS (and vice versa, a greater response is perceptually associated with a greater eccentricity of the terminator). Thus, the illusion may arise because the additional neural excitation induced by a nearby contextual distractors (elements filling the spatial interval of the image) increases the AWS response, which, in turn, is decoded by visual system as an increase in the perceived eccentricity of the terminator. The use of the model allowed to assume the appearance of an illusion in the case of previously unexplored variants of stimuli (as, for example, with a circle centered on a lateral terminator).
