= Otto Wiener (physicist) =

German physicist (1862–1927)

- Otto Wiener, experimental physicists in Leipzig since 1899
- Born: 15 June 1862; Karlsruhe, Grand Duchy of Baden (present-day Baden-Württemberg, Germany)
- Died: 18 January 1927 (aged 64); Leipzig, Saxony, Germany
- Known for: Standing electromagnetic waves in the visible range
- Scientific career
- Fields: Physics (experimental)
- Workplaces: Technical University of Karlsruhe; University of Strasbourg; University of Leipzig

Otto Heinrich Wiener (15 June 1862 – 18 January 1927) was a German physicist.

== Life and work ==
Otto Wiener was a son of Christian Wiener and Pauline Hausrath. Orphan of mother at the age of 3, he married Lina Fenner at 32.

He was a pupil of August Kundt at the University of Strasbourg, where he received his doctorate in 1887 with a thesis on the phase change of light upon reflection, and methods to determine the thickness of thin films.

Wiener is known for the experimental proof of standing light waves in 1890. In the same experiment series he demonstrated that it is the electrical and not magnetic component of light wave responsible for its action on photographic film, as well as proved that the wave is tangential. These experiments made him skeptical about the luminiferous aether theory.

He was professor at the University of Giessen from 1895.

In 1899 he became professor at the Physics Institute of the University of Leipzig, where he succeeded Gustav Wiedemann. Together with Theodor des Coudres, he built an excellent physical institute there, and appointed Peter Debye and Gregor Wentzel.

In his academic inaugural lecture at Leipzig of 1900 on The Extension of our Senses, he presented the theory of physical education in the context of evolutionary theory. He took up Heinrich Hertz's theory that separates internal images —a conceptualization of reality— from descriptions of experiment (Principles of Mechanics, 1894). It was the dawn of media technology. Wiener added to Hertz's work, and theorized cinematography as an extension of our senses (1900).

== The Standing Lightwaves Experiment ==
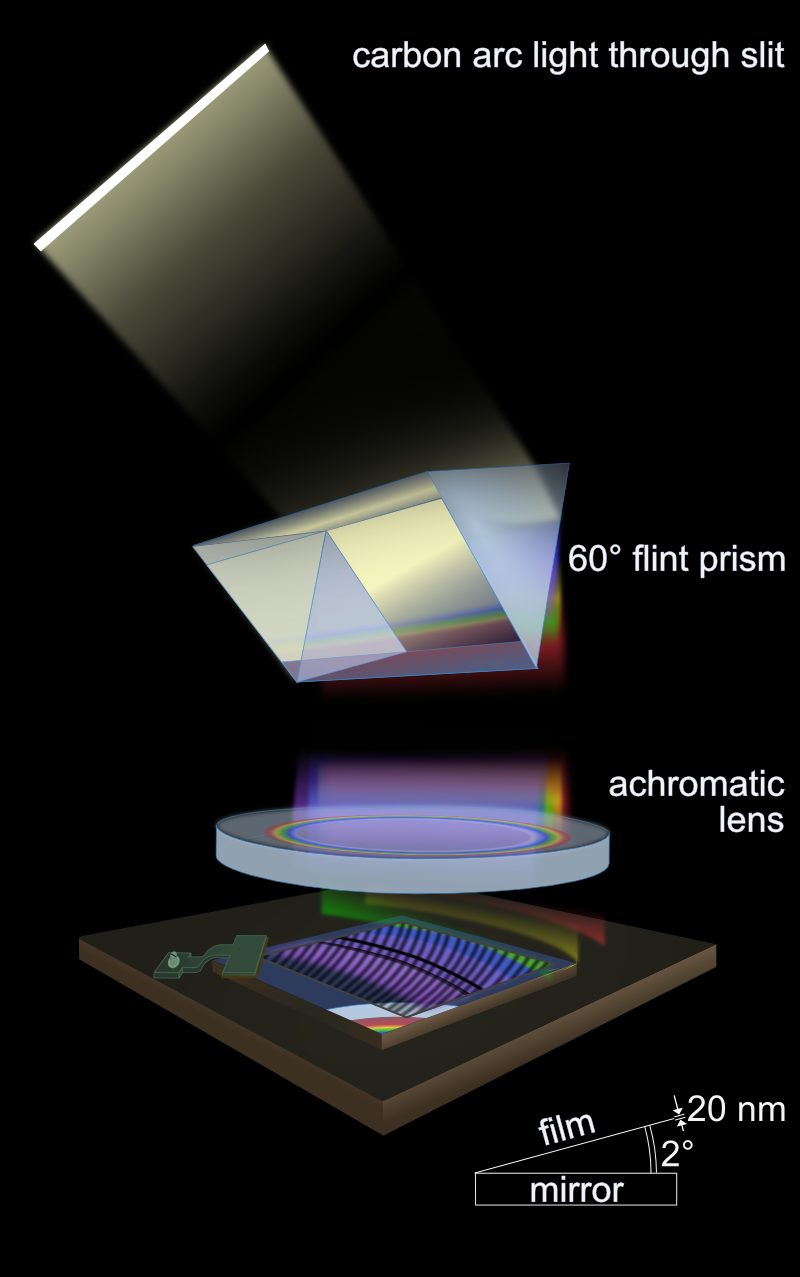
Schematic illustration of the experimental setup described by the author in 1890. The film is depicted as if it were a developed positive transparency, showing 27 waves and 2 transverse lines of the carbon arc spectrum near to Fraunhofer's H.

Otto Wiener's fame is mostly due to the experiment where he visualized light waves in steady conditions. Although it could be considered equivalent to Hertz's detection of radio waves, their intent differed. Hertz aimed at validating Maxwell's theory, while Wiener's purpose was to determine the plane of vibration of light waves, as they were conceived in mechanical theory. Note that both scientists, like most of their contemporaries, assumed the existence of aether. With the rise of quantum mechanics, the concept of luminous field changed dramatically. Nowadays, quantum optics replaced the problem of visualizing light waves with that of simultaneously measuring their phase and amplitude.

=== Experimental setup ===
The light was obtained from a carbon arc light, entering the darkroom through a slit. Then it was filtered through a prism, discarding most of the red side of the spectrum. An achromatic lens focused an 8mm-wide, slightly converging light beam. 220mm after the lens, the light hit a polished silver mirror perpendicularly. Monochromatic light would result in a uniform wavelength, hence a regular standing waves pattern, parallel to the mirror's surface. Wiener's orthochromatic film was transparently thin, about 20 nm, measured by interference, which is much less than the wavelength (the sodium doublet is at about 589 nm). It was laid on the mirror, over an equally thin slice of gel. That way, by applying pressure on one side of the film only, Wiener could slightly tilt it so as to make it traverse several standing waves. The standing waves were revealed by exposing the film for 20~35 minutes, after development and printing.

=== Drude's critique ===
Wiener added benzene to the wedge after having been criticized for not considering the possibility of having photographed thin-film interference fringes rather than standing waves. His interpretation validated Fresnel's interpretation rather than Neumann's. Paul Drude criticized Wiener for this. With Nernst, he repeated Wiener's experiment using a fluorescent film as detector, in order to prove that the effect was due to electric fields.

=== Relationship with interferential photography ===
A photographic experiment for validating Fresnel's theory had already been suggested by Wilhelm Zenker (1829-1899), after a call by the French Academy of Sciences in 1865. Zenker's proposal didn't delve into the thickness of the film, though. By exposing a thicker film, to be observed by reflection rather than by transparency, Gabriel Lippmann discovered interferential color photography, which he was awarded the Nobel prize for. Wiener contributed to Lippmann's theory thereafter.

=== Further repetitions of the experiment ===
Repetition of the experiment under different conditions was carried out by Leistner, a Wiener's student, to better characterize the radiation. Leistner modified a Mach–Zehnder interferometer so as to insert the film between the mirrors. Another repetition was the thesis of Ernst Schult, commissioned by Nernst and Max von Laue for comparing light intensity with the energy as measured with a micropyrometer, along the verification of the energy quantization hypothesis with respect to the simple wave theory. A further notable repetition, aimed at evaluating the dependence of a cesium film's photoelectric emission upon illumination conditions. Ives and Fry controlled bands formation using a thicker film to be dissected upon development. More recent repetitions avail of laser technology.

== Bibliography ==
- Die Erweiterung unserer Sinne, Academic inaugural lecture held on 19 May 1900. Leipzig 1900th, Leipzig 1900.
- Der Zusammenhang zwischen den Angaben der Reflexionsbeobachtungen an Metallen und ihrer optischen Konstanten, Teubner 1908.
- Über Farbenphotographie und verwandte naturwissenschaftliche Fragen, Paper presented at the 80th Scientific Congress at Cologne on the Rhine in the general meeting of the two main groups on 24 September 1908, in: Verh. der Ges. Dt. Naturforscher und Ärzte. 80. Vers. zu Köln. Tl. 1. Vogel, Leipzig 1909.
- Vogelflug, Luftfahrt und Zukunft, mit einem Anhang über Krieg und Völkerfriede. Barth, Leipzig 1911.
- Die Theorie des Mischkörpers für das Feld der stationären Strömung. 1. Abhandlung: Die Mittelwertsätze für Kraft, Polarisation und Energie. Transactions of the mathematical-physical class of the Royal Saxon Society of Sciences, Volume 32, No. 6, Leipzig 1912.
- Physik und Kulturentwicklung durch technische und wissenschaftliche Erweiterung der menschlichen Naturanlagen, Leipzig, Berlin 1919.
- Fliegerkraftlehre, Hirzel, Leipzig 1920. (Works on aeronautical problems, introduction to aviation and aerodynamics for aspiring pilots.)
- Das Grundgesetz der Natur und die Erhaltung der absoluten Geschwindigkeit im Äther, Transactions of the Saxon Academy of Sciences, Mathematics and Physical Class IV, Teubner, Leipzig 1921.
- Schwingungen elastischer Art im kräftefreien Strömungsäther, in: Phys. Zeitschrift, vol. 25, 1924, pp. 552–559.
- Weiten, Zeiten, Geschwindigkeiten. Ein Gespräch über grundlegende naturwissenschaftliche Fragen, Düsseldorf 1925.
- Natur und Mensch. Die Naturwissenschaften und ihre Anwendungen. 4 vols. Edited by CW Schmidt Edit. by HH Kritzinger, CW Schmidt, Otto Wiener, Hugo Kauffmann, K. Keilhack, G. Kraitschek, F. Cappeller, C. Schäffer including de Gruyter, Berlin 1926–1931.
- Zur Theorie des Strömungsäthers. In: Phys. Zeitschrift, vol. 26. 1928, S. 73–78.
