= Hermann August Hagen =

German entomologist (1817–1893)

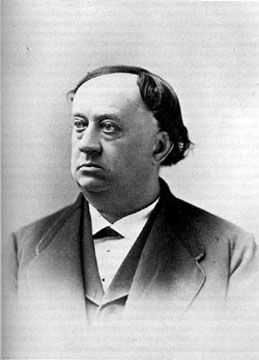
- Born: 30 May 1817; Königsberg, Prussia
- Died: 9 November 1893 (aged 76); Cambridge, Massachusetts, United States
- Citizenship: German
- Education: University of Königsberg
- Known for: Monographie des Termites, Synopsis of the Neuroptera of North America
- Parent(s): Anna (Linck) Hagen and Carl Heinrich Hagen
- Scientific career
- Fields: Medicine and Entomology
- Institutions: Harvard University
- Notable students: John Henry Comstock, Albert J. Cook, Herbert Osborn, Henry G. Hubbard, Charles W. Woodworth
- Author abbrev. (zoology): Hagen

Hermann August Hagen (30 May 1817 – 9 November 1893) was a German entomologist who specialised in Neuroptera and Odonata. He had established himself as one of Europe's preeminent entomologists by 1867 when he accepted a position at Harvard University to curate the Museum of Comparative Zoology. In 1870 he became the first entomologist in the United States to hold the formal title, Professor of Entomology.

== Biography ==
Hagen was born 30 May 1817 in Königsberg, Prussia. He was the son of Anna (Linck) Hagen and Carl Heinrich Hagen. His father was a senior government counselor and a professor of political science at the University of Königsberg and his grandfather, Karl Gottfried Hagen, was a professor of chemistry at the same university.

Young Hagen graduated from a gymnasium in 1836 and began to study medicine at the University of Königsberg. His course of studies was greatly influenced by his zoology professor, Martin Heinrich Rathke and together they toured major entomological collections and libraries in Norway, Sweden, Denmark and Germany. In 1839 he published his first paper, List of the Dragonflies of East Prussia. In 1840, he received his medical degree, having written his thesis on European species of dragonflies. He then studied medicine in Berlin, Vienna, Paris, and elsewhere. In 1843, he returned to Königsberg, entered into the general practice of medicine, and for three years was first assistant at a surgical hospital.

In spite of the heavy workload at the hospital, Hagen continued his entomological studies. He published several papers on dragonflies as a result of his close collaboration with Edmond de Sélys Longchamps. They remained collaborators even after Hagen emigrated to America. Hagen also published the Monographie des Termites from 1855 to 1860. This detailed study of termites was called "a masterpiece of original work".

In 1856, Hagen met the Russian entomologist, Carl Robert Osten-Sacken. Osten-Sacken convinced Hagen to make a study of the Neuroptera of North America and sent him large collections of material, including insects he had collected in the American West. In 1861 Hagen published the resulting Synopsis of the Neuroptera of North America. In addition to his work on living Neuroptera, Hagen made important and pioneering studies of extinct Neuroptera, especially the Mesozoic European species found trapped in amber. One of his best known works was Bibliotheca Entomologica. Published as two volumes in 1862 and 1863, it was an attempt to list all the publications on entomology up to 1862. For many years after publication it was considered one of the most accurate and complete scientific bibliographies available.

In spite of a busy medical practice and a full program of scientific studies, Hagen also found time to serve as a member of the school board and vice-president of the city council in Königsberg from 1863 to 1867. While holding these civic offices, he was invited by Louis Agassiz to come to Cambridge as assistant in entomology at the Museum of Comparative Zoology at Harvard. Agassiz had been encouraged in this idea by Osten-Sacken. Hagen accepted, and in 1867 he emigrated to the United States. In Cambridge he became curator of the museum's entomological collections and in 1870 he was named Professor of Entomology, becoming the first person in America to hold that title.

Hagen approached his new responsibilities with great energy. Under his direction the entire entomological collection was reorganized, cleaned and stored in new boxes and cabinets. The revitalized museum attracted significant new collections donated by some of America's leading entomologists. He is also credited with reversing the traditional flow of insect collections from America to Europe. In 1877 for example, Hermann Loew's collection of American Diptera in Berlin was repatriated to Cambridge.

Hagen was also an influential teacher at Harvard. Several of his students went on to become notable entomologists, including John Henry Comstock, Albert J. Cook, Herbert Osborn, Henry G. Hubbard, and Charles W. Woodworth.

He seldom made field trips, usually confining his travel to museums, libraries and universities. However, in 1882 he participated in a survey of insect pests along the Northern Pacific Railroad, traveling through Montana, California, Oregon and Washington.

He was a member of several scientific societies including the American Academy of Arts and Sciences, the American Philosophical Society and the American Entomological Society. He founded the Cambridge Entomological Club. In 1863, he received the honorary degree of Ph.D. from the University of Königsberg.

== Works ==
Hagen wrote over 400 articles, including:

- with Edmond de Sélys Longchamps. "Revue des odonates ou Libellules d'Europe." Mémoires de la Société Royale des Sciences de Liége 6:1-408 (1850).
- Monographie der Termiten (1855–1860).
- Synopsis of North American Neuroptera (1861). This work was written at the request of the Smithsonian Institution. Some of the terms used by Hagen were not well explained in this work. This was corrected by the Irish Entomologist Alexander Henry Haliday in 1857 in "Explanation of terms used by Dr Hagen in his synopsis of the British Dragon-flies," Entomologists' Annual 164-15, Fig.
- Bibliotheca Entomologica (1862–1863). This work, listing all entomological literature up to 1862, was found in all the major entomology libraries. It was the "entomologist's bible.".
