= Karl Gottfried Hagen =

German chemist (1749–1829)

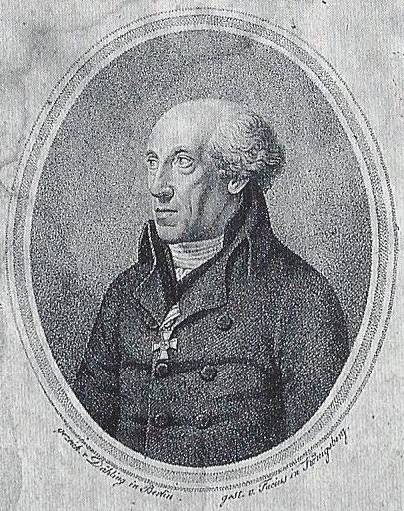
- Karl Gottfried Hagen
- Born: 24 December 1749; Königsberg, Prussia
- Died: 2 March 1829 (aged 79); Königsberg, Prussia
- Children: Carl Heinrich Hagen; Ernst August Hagen
- Scientific career
- Fields: Pharmaceutical chemistry
- Workplaces: University of Königsberg

Karl Gottfried Hagen (24 December 1749 – 2 March 1829) was a German chemist.

Hagen was born and died in Königsberg, Prussia.

He founded the first German chemical laboratory at the University of Königsberg, thus establishing the scientific discipline of pharmaceutical chemistry in Germany. He worked as a professor in the field of physics, chemistry and mineralogy.

His daughter Johanna married the astronomer Friedrich Wilhelm Bessel, and his daughter Louise Florentine married the physicist Franz Ernst Neumann. He was father of Carl Heinrich Hagen and Ernst August Hagen, and grandfather of Hermann August Hagen and Adolf Hermann Hagen.

== Works ==
- Lehrbuch der Apothekerkunst . Hartung, Königsberg; Leipzig 2nd ed. 1781 Digital edition / Dritte, rechtmäßige und verbesserte Ausgabe 1786 Digital edition / 1788 Digital edition /Vol.1 6th ed. 1806 Digital edition / Vol.1&2 7th ed. 1808 Digital edition / Vol.2 1821 Digital edition by the University and State Library Düsseldorf
- Grundriß der Experimentalpharmacie zum Gebrauch bey dem Vortrage derselben . Hartung, Königsberg / Leipzig 1790 Digital edition by the University and State Library Düsseldorf
