= Ernst August Hagen =

Prussian writer on art and novelist

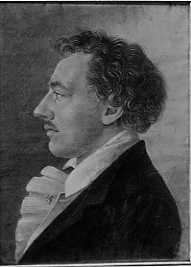
- Ernst August Hagen from an engraving by his sister, Florentine Neumann (1800-1838)
- Born: 12 April 1797; Königsberg, East Prussia, Kingdom of Prussia
- Died: 15 February 1880 (aged 82); Königsberg, East Prussia, Germany
- Education: "Albertina University", Königsberg
- Occupations: University Professor (Art history & Aesthetics); Novelist/Poet
- Spouse: Emilie Cäcilie Oestreich (1805-1876)
- Children: Gertrud Hagen (1826-1826); Auguste Anna Margarethe Hagen (1827-1914); Carl Gottfried Johann "Hans" Hagen (1829–1910); Ernst Heinrich Hagen (1831–1905); Clara Elisabeth Hagen (1833-1856); Elise Friederike Hagen (1835-1920)
- Parent(s): Karl Gottfried Hagen (1749-1829); Johanna Maria Rabe (1764-1829)

Ernst August Hagen (12 April 1797 - 15 February 1880) was a Prussian writer on art and novelist. He taught at Königsberg University and was the first Prussian scholar to hold a teaching chair in Art history and Aesthetics.

== Family provenance and connections ==
Ernst August Hagen was born in Königsberg, at that time the administrative capital of East Prussia (and for almost a decade after 1806 when the king fled from Berlin, the home of the Prussian Court). His father, Karl Gottfried Hagen (1749-1829) was a distinguished chemist and the court apothecary.

The family was intellectually distinguished and well connected socially. Ernst August's older brother, Carl Heinrich Hagen (1785-1856) was a professor of law and economics and a senior government official who had become became an early and prominent advocate of free trade after studying the work of Adam Smith. A cousin, Gotthilf Hagen (1797-1884), was notable as a hydraulic engineer. His younger sister, Florentine Hagen (1800-1838), later married the physicist-mathematician Franz Ernst Neumann (1798-1895); and as the result of the marriage of his elder sister, Johanna Hagen (1794-1885), he was also a brother-in-law to the astronomer-physicist Friedrich Bessel (1784-1846).

In 1807/08, when he was 11, Ernst August and his brothers were taught by their father in the court apothecary, alongside the royal princes Friedrich Wilhelm and Wilhelm.

== Life ==
Hagen passed his Abitur (school final exams) at the Altstadt Gymnasium which opened the way to his study of natural sciences and medicine in 1816 at the city's "Albertina University". The subject choice respected his father's wishes. Fairly soon, however, he changed his focus, touring East Prussia with his friend, the young historian Johannes Voigt and familiarising himself with the old artistic monuments dating back to the Teutonic Order as the focus of his studies switched to arts and literature. He received his doctorate in 1821. His habilitation followed just two years later. He had already, while still a student, published in 1820 his romantic fairy-tale poem, "Olfried and Lisena", which was spotted by Goethe who judged it very positively.

In 1821 he embarked on a lengthy "study trip" which according to one source lasted two years, although timelines are in places vague so there may, instead, have been more than one trip undertaken, each of shorter duration. During the winter term of 1821/22 he was in Göttingen where he attended the lectures of the classical philologist Otfried Müller. He subsequently visited the principal artistic centres in Germany and Italy, making the acquaintance of a number of high-profile figures in arts and scholarship, forming friendships that were both "professional" and "personal". By the time he got back to Königsberg, in 1824, his burgeoning network included Carl Friedrich Gauß, Johann Wolfgang von Goethe, Jean Paul and Bertel Thorwaldsen. He now began to lecture on artistic and literary topics.

In 1825 Hagen was appointed extraordinary professor in his culture related specialities at the university. He took on the teaching chair in German studies vacated by Karl Lachmann when the latter moved on to Berlin. In 1830 he took a teaching chair in Art History at Königsberg, the first such academic appointment in Prussia. Hagen received his full professorship in 1831. He was also given oversight of the university's artistic collections. Sources stress the impact of his enthusiasm for his subject. He backed the new city art gallery in 1831. He argued powerfully for the new Königsberg Arts Academy which opened in 1845, using personal contacts as appropriate, and in the end it was the new king himself, with whom Hagen had studied at the court apothecary back in 1807/08, who signed the cabinet order approving the project in May 1842.

Ernst August Hagen was a consummate networker. He used his contacts and friendships in order to promote the development of the arts and arts related institutions in his home city. His circle included Peter von Cornelius (1783–1876), Ludwig von Schorn (1793–1842), Karl von der Groeben (1788–1876), Ignaz von Olfers (1826–1872), Eduard Gerhard (1795–1867), Wilhelm Eduard Albrecht (1800–1876), Franz Kugler (1808–1858), Ludwig Tieck (1773–1853), Gustav Friedrich Waagen (1794–1868), William Motherby (1776–1847), Eduard Devrient (1801–1877), Karl Schnaase (1798–1875) and Joseph von Eichendorff (1788–1857).

== Family matters ==
Ernst August Hagen married Emilie Cäcilie "Molly" Oestreich (1805-1876) at Braunsberg in 1825. Her father, Johann Oestreich, was a merchant from one of the region's leading families. Five of the six recorded children from the marriage, born between 1826 and 1835, survived beyond infancy. Both the sons pursued military careers. Ernst Heinrich Hagen (1831–1905) became a Lieutenant general and adjutant to Prince Albert of Prussia. He was himself raised to the nobility (thereby becoming identified in subsequent sources as Ernst Heinrich von Hagen) in 1871 and between 1876 and 1882 served as commander of the Number 5 Dragoon Regiment. The elder son, Hans Hagen (1829-1905), became a Lieutenant colonel and director of the Kassel War Academy.

Ernst August Hagen remained engaged in Königsberg's cultural life almost till the end. He died in Königsberg on 15 February 1880.
