= Carl Heinrich Hagen =

Prussian economist (1785–1856)

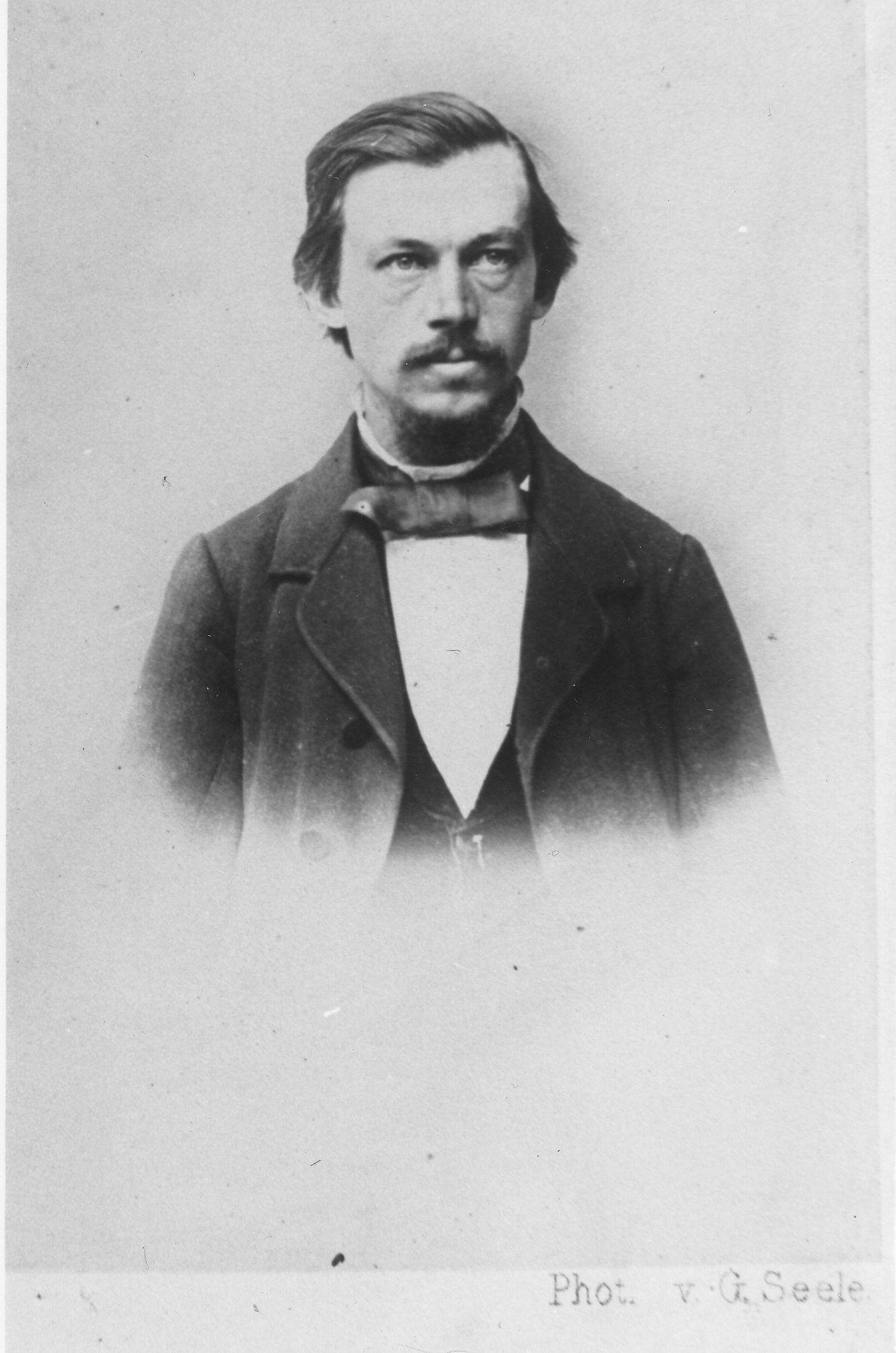
- Born: 29 July 1785; Königsberg, Prussia
- Died: 16 December 1856 (aged 71); Königsberg, Prussia
- Occupations: Law professor; writer
- Spouse: Doris Linck (1789–1869)
- Children: 6, including Hermann and Adolf
- Parent: Karl Gottfried Hagen

Carl Heinrich Hagen (also Karl Heinrich Hagen 29 July 1785 – 16 December 1856) was a jurist, socio-economist and, between 1811 and 1835, senior government official (Regierungsrat). From 1811 he was also a professor of jurisprudence and the University of Königsberg in what was at that time East Prussia.

== Life ==
=== Familial provenance ===
Carl Heinrich Hagen was born into a well connected family of middle-class intellectuals in Königsberg. His father, Karl Gottfried Hagen (1749–1829) was a distinguished chemist. The novelist Ernst August Hagen was his brother. The physicist-astronomer Friedrich Bessel and the mineralogist-physicist Franz Ernst Neumann became his brothers in law. The royal family were obliged to relocate for several years to the city following October 1806. Hagen frequently accompanied his father on visits to the royal court where during 1808/09 his father tutored the Princes Frederick-William and William, two future Prussian kings, on pharmaceutical and related matters.

=== Academic career ===
Hagen studied Law and Jurisprudence at the University of Königsberg. He was a student of Christian Jakob Kraus (1753–1807) and of Albrecht von Thaer (1752–1828), whom he later described as an unforgettable teacher and patron ("unvergesslichen Lehrer und Gönner"). On leaving university he embarked on a career in government service. In Prussia he enjoyed a formidable reputation as a result of his writings and in 1809 he was recruited into the Prussian civil service, advancing to the grade of Regierungsrat. At the university he was appointed initially as a visiting professor in Jurisprudence and Commerce. He progressed to the post of full professor, later also taking over the teaching chair of his former tutor, C. J. Kraus. He was appointed Rector of the university for Summer 1834, having served as pro-rector during the summer term of 1826.

=== Marriage and connections ===
Carl Heinrich Hagen himself married Doris Linck (1789–1869). The marriage produced six recorded children including the mathematics professor Robert Hagen (1815–1858), the zoology professor Hermann August Hagen (1817–1893) and the successful politician Adolf Hagen (1820–1894). According to a diary entry by his sister Florentine, Hagen's home along the "Sackheimer Tränkgasse" in Königsberg became a social hub for members of Prussia's political and scientific elite. Alexander von Humboldt was a regular visitor. Evidence of Hagen's propensity for networking also comes from his correspondences with Regional President Hans Jakob von Auerswald, Georg Heinrich Ludwig Nicolovius and Wilhelm von Humboldt.

=== Political career ===
Marked out as a "high-flyer", the government sent him on a prolonged visit to Göttingen and London between 1809 and 1811. In England he encountered the economic liberalism which was becoming increasingly popular in a country that was being subjected to a (less than totally effective) economic blockade by France. Hagen became an enthusiastic partisan of the doctrines propounded across Britain by the Scotsman Adam Smith (1723-1790). From now on he became noteworthy as an early advocate of free trade.

=== Final years ===
After an active career in public life, Hagen retired from his government position in 1835. He later suffered a serious stroke and in 1849 also retired from his university professorship, living in retirement till his death in 1856. During his final years he suffered from speech loss and hearing loss.

== Works ==
One of Hagen's most controversial publications appeared in 1814 and dealt with the impact of the Agriculture Law. Hagen demanded, as urgent and necessary, national reform and the lifting of burdensome obligations owed by peasant farmers to the land owners. In the face of opposition to such reforms from the nobility and the major land owners, Hagen was able to invoke the ideas of Albrecht Thaer (1752 - 1828), the founder of rational land-use theory, in his advocacy of "reason-based ownership structures with equalised land holdings" ("rationelle Betriebsformen mit Flächenausdehnung der landwirtschaftlichen Betriebe"). As early as 1814 Hagen was promoting the idea that the burden of indebtedness between peasant farmers and land owners could be ameliorated through the application of special reduced interest rates on outstanding debt burdens, to be applied using credit institutions established to mediate the debtor-creditor relationships, and through reforming land ownership laws. His ideas anticipated measures that came to be implemented more than a generation, notably with the creation of the early Agricultural Credit Bank ("Landwirtschaftliche Rentenbank") founded in 1849. Throughout his 45 years of public service Hagen was known as an advocate of economic liberalism, opposing tariff barriers. He was an early campaigner for free trade across Europe.

His most important publications were:

- Ueber das Agrargesetz und die Anwendbarkeit desselben (Königsberg 1814)
- Von der Staatslehre (1839)
- Nothwendigkeit der Handelsfreiheit für das Nationaleinkommen (1844)

He also worked on the "Neuen preußischen Provinzialblättern" (newspaper) run by his brother Ernst August Hagen between 1846 and 1857.
