= Melde's experiment =

1859 wave interference experiment

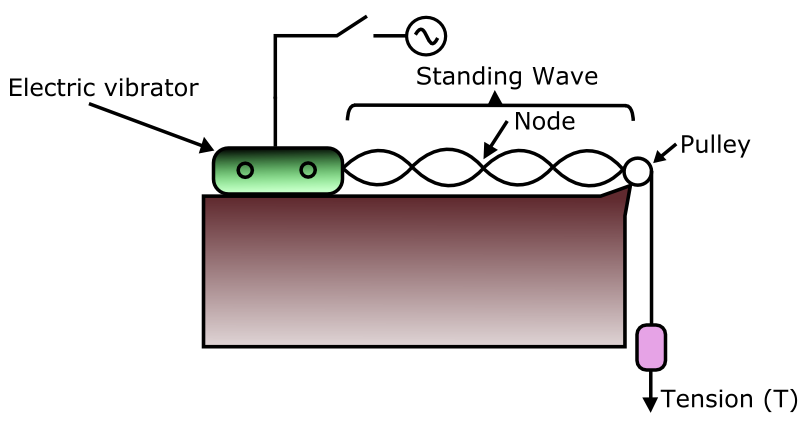
A model of Melde's experiment: an electric vibrator connected to a cable drives a pulley that suspends a mass that causes tension in the cable.

Melde's experiment is a scientific experiment carried out in 1859 by the German physicist Franz Melde on the standing waves produced in a tense cable originally set oscillating by a tuning fork, later improved with connection to an electric vibrator. This experiment, "a lecture-room standby", attempted to demonstrate that mechanical waves undergo interference phenomena. In the experiment, mechanical waves traveled in opposite directions form immobile points, called nodes. These waves were called standing waves by Melde since the position of the nodes and loops (points where the cord vibrated) stayed static.

Standing waves were first discovered by Franz Melde, who coined the term "standing wave" around 1860. Melde generated parametric oscillations in a string by employing a tuning fork to periodically vary the tension at twice the resonance frequency of the string.

== History ==
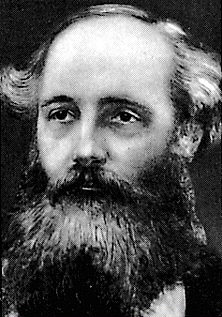
James Clerk Maxwell, a Scottish physicist who pioneered investigations of electromagnetic radiation and investigated wave phenomena.

Wave phenomena in nature have been investigated for centuries, some being some of the most controverted themes in the history of science, and so the case is with the wave nature of light. In the 17th century, Sir Isaac Newton described light through a corpuscular theory. The English physicist Thomas Young later contrasted Newton's theories in the 18th century and established the scientific basis upon which rest the wave theories. At the end of the 19th century, at the peak of the Second Industrial Revolution, the creation of electricity as the technology of the era offered a new contribution to the wave theories. This advance allowed Franz Melde to recognize the phenomena of wave interference and the creation of standing waves. Later, the Scottish physicist James Clerk Maxwell in his study of the wave nature of light succeeded in expressing waves and the electromagnetic spectrum in a mathematical formula.

== Principle ==
Standing waves, in which each immobile point represents a node.

A string undergoing transverse vibration illustrates many features common to all vibrating acoustic systems, whether these are the vibrations of a guitar string or the standing wave nodes in a studio monitoring room. In this experiment the change in frequency produced when the tension is increased in the string – similar to the change in pitch when a guitar string is tuned – will be measured. From this the mass per unit length of the string / wire can be derived. This is called as the principle of the Melde's Experiment

Finding the mass per unit length of a piece of string is also possible by using a simpler method – a ruler and some scales – and this will be used to check the results and offer a comparison.

== See also ==
- Sonar
- Wind instruments
- Sonometer
