= Franz Melde =

German physicist and professor (1832–1901)

Standing waves, in which each immobile point represents a node.

Franz Emil Melde (March 11, 1832, in Großenlüder near Fulda – March 17, 1901, in Marburg) was a German physicist and professor. A graduate of the University of Marburg under Christian Ludwig Gerling, he later taught there, focusing primarily on acoustics, also making contributions to fields including fluid mechanics and meteorology. He began in 1860 as Gerling's assistant at the University's Mathematical and Physical Institute, succeeding him in 1864.

Standing waves were first discovered by Melde, who coined the term "standing wave" (stehende Welle) around 1860. What is known as "Melde's experiment", "a lecture-room standby", demonstrates standing waves and their patterns on a string, is used to measure the speed of transverse wave, and to determine the effect of tension, length, and mass on the transverse waves of a string. In 1859 Melde generated parametric oscillations in a string by employing a tuning fork to periodically vary the tension at twice the resonance frequency of the monochord string.

He was a member of the Landsmannschaft fraternity. In 1885 he was elected to the Academy of Sciences Leopoldina and in 1893 received a silver medal at the Chicago Columbian Exposition.

== Works ==
- "Ueber einige krumme Flächen, welche von Ebenen parallel einer bestimmten Ebene durchschmittsfigur einen Kegelschnitt liefern" (thesis, 1859)
- "Über Erregung stehender Wellen eines fadenförmigen Körpers", Poggendorffs Annalen der Physik und Chemie (Serie 2), Bd. 109, 1859, S. 193-215 ["The Production of Standing Waves in Strings"]
- Das Monochord und Farbenspectrum [The Monochord and Color Spectrum] (1864)
- Experimentaluntersuchungen über Blasenbildung im Kreisförmig cylindrischen Röhren [Experimental studies of bubble formation in the Circular cylindrical tubes] (1868)
- Akustik: Fundamentalerscheinungen und Gesetze Einfach Tönender Körper (acoustics textbook, 1883)
- Measurement of Time [Theorie und Praxis der astronomischen Zeitbestimmung] (1876)
- Chladni's Lebe und Wirken [Chladni's Life and Work] (1888)
- "Die wolkenlosen Tage, beobachtet in den Jahren 1866 bis 1894 an der meteorologischen Station Marburg" ["Cloudless Days observed at the Meteorological Station at Marburg during the years 1886-1894"] (1895)
- Estimation of the Upper Limit of Audibility
