= Seiche =

Standing wave in an enclosed or partially enclosed body of water

A seiche (/seɪʃ/ SAYSH) is a standing wave in an enclosed or partially enclosed body of water. Seiches and seiche-related phenomena have been observed on lakes, reservoirs, swimming pools, bays, harbors, caves, and seas. The key requirement for formation of a seiche is that the body of water be at least partially bounded, allowing the formation of the standing wave.

The term was promoted in 1890 by the Swiss hydrologist François-Alphonse Forel, who was the first to make scientific observations of the effect in Lake Geneva. The word had apparently long been used in the region to describe oscillations in alpine lakes. According to Wilson (1972), this Swiss French dialect word comes from the Latin word siccus meaning "dry", i.e., as the water recedes, the beach dries. The French word sec or sèche (dry) descends from the Latin.

Seiches in harbours can be caused by long-period or infragravity waves, which are due to subharmonic nonlinear wave interaction with the wind waves, having periods longer than the accompanying wind-generated waves.

A standing wave (black) depicted as a sum of two propagating waves traveling in opposite directions (blue and red).

== Causes and nature ==
Seiches are often imperceptible to the naked eye, and observers in boats on the surface may not notice that a seiche is occurring due to the extremely long periods.

The effect is caused by resonances in a body of water that has been disturbed by one or more factors, most often meteorological effects (wind and atmospheric pressure variations), seismic activity, or tsunamis. Gravity always seeks to restore the horizontal surface of a body of liquid water, as this represents the configuration in which the water is in hydrostatic equilibrium.

Vertical harmonic motion results, producing an impulse that travels the length of the basin at a velocity that depends on the depth of the water. The impulse is reflected back from the end of the basin, generating interference. Repeated reflections produce standing waves with one or more nodes, or points, that experience no vertical motion. The frequency of the oscillation is determined by the size of the basin, its depth and contours, and the water temperature.

The longest natural period of a seiche is the period associated with the fundamental resonance for the body of water—corresponding to the longest standing wave. For a surface seiche in an enclosed rectangular body of water this can be estimated using Merian's formula:

$$T = \frac{\ \ 2L\ \ }{\!\!\!\sqrt{g h}}$$

where T is the longest natural period, L and h are the length and average depth of the body of water, and g the acceleration of gravity.

Higher-order harmonics are also observed. The period of the second harmonic will be half the natural period, the period of the third harmonic will be a third of the natural period, and so forth.

== Occurrence ==
Seiches have been observed on both lakes and seas. The key requirement is that the body of water be partially constrained to allow formation of standing waves. Regularity of geometry is not required; even harbours with exceedingly irregular shapes are routinely observed to oscillate with very stable frequencies.

=== Lake seiches ===
Low rhythmic seiches are almost always present on larger lakes. They are usually unnoticeable among the common wave patterns, except during periods of unusual calm. Harbours, bays, and estuaries are often prone to small seiches with amplitudes of a few centimetres and periods of a few minutes.

The original studies in Lake Geneva by François-Alphonse Forel found the longitudinal period to have a 73-minute cycle, and the transversal seiche to have a period of around 10 minutes. Another lake well known for its regular seiches is New Zealand's Lake Wakatipu, which varies its surface height at Queenstown by 20 centimetres in a 27-minute cycle. Seiches can also form in semi-enclosed seas; the North Sea often experiences a lengthwise seiche with a period of about 36 hours.

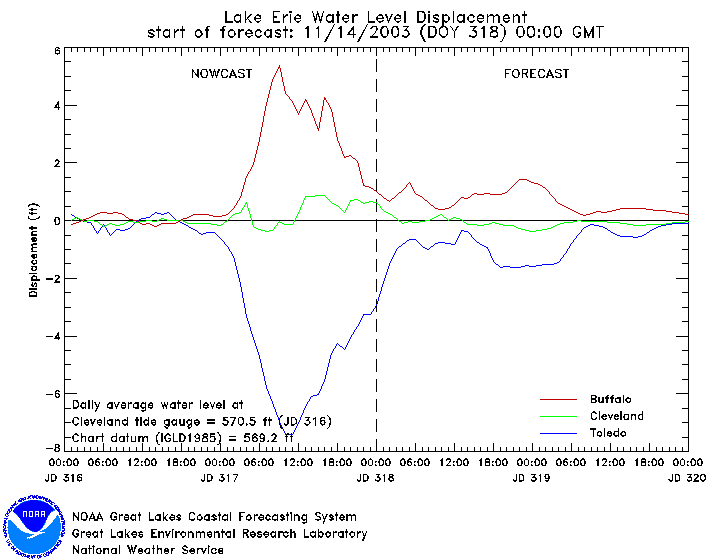
Differences in water level caused by a seiche on Lake Erie, recorded between Buffalo, New York (red) and Toledo, Ohio (blue) on November 14, 2003

The National Weather Service issues low water advisories for portions of the Great Lakes when seiches of 0.6 metres (2 ft) or greater are likely to occur. Lake Erie is particularly prone to wind-caused seiches because of its shallowness and its elongation on a northeast–southwest axis, which frequently matches the direction of prevailing winds and therefore maximises the fetch of those winds. These can lead to extreme seiches of up to 5 metres (16 ft) between the ends of the lake.

The effect is similar to a storm surge like that caused by hurricanes along ocean coasts, but the seiche effect can cause oscillation back and forth across the lake for some time. In 1954, the remnants of Hurricane Hazel piled up water along the northwestern Lake Ontario shoreline near Toronto, causing extensive flooding, and established a seiche that subsequently caused flooding along the south shore.

Lake seiches can occur very quickly: on July 13, 1995, a large seiche on Lake Superior caused the water level to fall and then rise again by one metre (three feet) within fifteen minutes, leaving some boats hanging from the docks on their mooring lines when the water retreated. The same storm system that caused the 1995 seiche on Lake Superior produced a similar effect in Lake Huron, in which the water level at Port Huron changed by 1.8 metres (6 ft) over two hours. On June 26, 1954, on Lake Michigan in Chicago, eight fishermen were swept away from piers at Montrose and North Avenue Beaches and drowned when a 3-metre (10 ft) seiche hit the Chicago waterfront.

Lakes in seismically active areas, such as Lake Tahoe in California/Nevada, are significantly at risk from seiches. Geological evidence indicates that the shores of Lake Tahoe may have been hit by seiches and tsunamis as much as 10 metres (33 ft) high in prehistoric times, and local researchers have called for the risk to be factored into emergency plans for the region.

Earthquake-generated seiches can be observed thousands of miles away from the epicentre of a quake. Swimming pools are especially prone to seiches caused by earthquakes, as the ground tremors often match the resonant frequencies of small bodies of water. The 1994 Northridge earthquake in California caused swimming pools to overflow across southern California. The massive Good Friday earthquake that hit Alaska in 1964 caused seiches in swimming pools as far away as Puerto Rico. The earthquake that hit Lisbon, Portugal in 1755 also caused seiches 2,100 kilometres (1,300 mi) farther north in Loch Lomond, Loch Long, Loch Katrine and Loch Ness in Scotland, and in canals in Sweden. The 2004 Indian Ocean earthquake caused seiches in standing water bodies in many Indian states as well as in Bangladesh, Nepal, and northern Thailand. Seiches were again observed in Uttar Pradesh, Tamil Nadu and West Bengal in India as well as in many locations in Bangladesh during the 2005 Kashmir earthquake.

The 1950 Assam–Tibet earthquake is known to have generated seiches as far away as Norway and southern England. Other earthquakes in or near the Indian sub-continent known to have generated seiches include the 1803 Kumaon-Barahat, 1819 Allah Bund, 1842 Central Bengal, 1905 Kangra, 1930 Dhubri, 1934 Nepal-Bihar, 2001 Bhuj, 2005 Nias and the 2005 Teresa Island earthquakes. The February 27, 2010 Chile earthquake produced a seiche on Lake Pontchartrain, Louisiana, with a height of around 150 millimetres (0.5 ft). The 2010 Baja California earthquake produced large seiches that quickly became an internet phenomenon.

Seiches up to at least 1.8 m (6 feet) were observed in Sognefjorden, Norway, during the 2011 Tōhoku earthquake in Japan.

=== Sea and bay seiches ===
Seiches have been observed in seas such as the Adriatic Sea and the Baltic Sea. This results in the flooding of Venice and Saint Petersburg, respectively, as both cities are constructed on former marshland. In St. Petersburg, seiche-induced flooding is common along the Neva River in the autumn. The seiche is driven by a low-pressure region in the North Atlantic moving onshore, giving rise to cyclonic lows on the Baltic Sea. The low pressure of the cyclone draws greater-than-normal quantities of water into the virtually landlocked Baltic. As the cyclone continues inland, long, low-frequency seiche waves with wavelengths up to several hundred kilometres are established in the Baltic. When the waves reach the narrow and shallow Neva Bay, they become much higher—ultimately flooding the Neva embankments. Similar phenomena are observed at Venice, resulting in the MOSE Project, a system of 79 mobile barriers designed to protect the three entrances to the Venetian Lagoon.

In Japan, seiches have been observed in Nagasaki Bay, most often in the spring. During a seiche event on 31 March 1979, a water-level displacement of 2.78 metres (9.1 ft) was recorded at Nagasaki tide station; the maximum displacement in the whole bay is thought to have reached as much as 4.70 metres (15.4 ft). Seiches in Western Kyushu—including Nagasaki Bay—are often induced by a low in the atmospheric pressure passing South of Kyushu island. Seiches in Nagasaki Bay have a period of about 30 to 40 minutes. Locally, seiches have caused floods, destroyed port facilities and damaged the fishery: hence the local word for seiche, あびき (abiki), from 網引き (amibiki), meaning 'the dragging-away of a fishing net'.

On occasion, tsunamis can produce seiches as a result of local geographic peculiarities. For instance, the tsunami that hit Hawaii in 1946 had a fifteen-minute interval between wave fronts. The natural resonant period of Hilo Bay is about thirty minutes. That meant that every second wave was in phase with the bay, creating a seiche. As a result, Hilo suffered worse damage than any other place in Hawaii, with the combined tsunami and seiche reaching a height of 26 feet (7.9 m) along the Bayfront, killing 96 people in the city alone. Seiche waves may continue for several days after a tsunami.

Tide-generated internal solitary waves (solitons) can excite coastal seiches at the following locations: Magueyes Island in Puerto Rico, Puerto Princesa in Palawan Island, Trincomalee Bay in Sri Lanka, and in the Bay of Fundy in eastern Canada, where seiches cause some of the highest recorded tidal fluctuations in the world. A dynamical mechanism exists for the generation of coastal seiches by deep-sea internal waves. These waves can generate a sufficient current at the shelf break to excite coastal seiches.

In September 2023, an enormous landslide resulting from a melting glacier near Dickson Fjord in Greenland triggered a megatsunami about 200 metres (660 ft) high. This was followed by a seiche with waves up to 7 metres (23 ft) high oscillating within the fjord. This seiche lasted nine days, reflecting the avalanche's large size and the fjord's long, narrow shape. During that period, it generated unusual seismic reverberations detected around the world, puzzling seismologists for some time before they could identify their source. Similarly, a seiche developed following a very large landslide into Tracy Arm in southeast Alaska on August 10, 2025, which triggered a megatsunami about 481 m (1,578 ft) high. The seismic energy from the seiche was measured on seismometers around the world for about a day and a half.

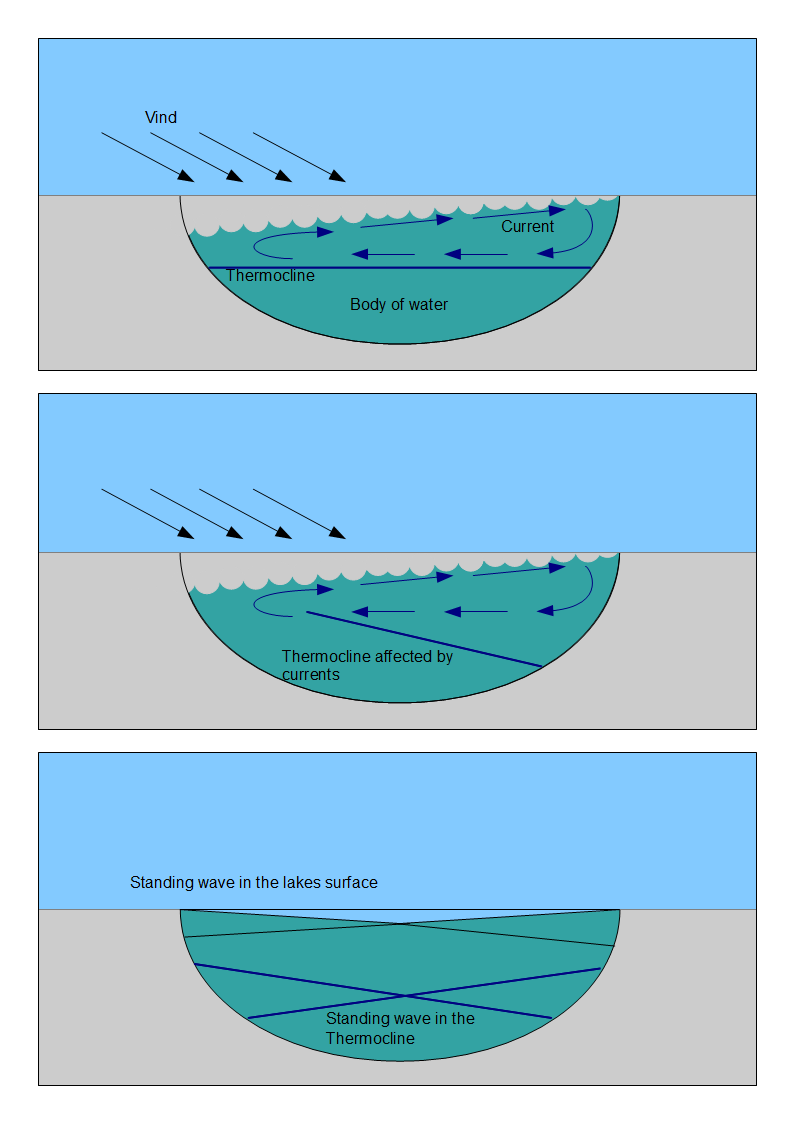
Illustration of the initiation of surface and subsurface thermocline seiches.

=== Underwater (internal) waves ===
Seiches are also observed beneath the surface of constrained bodies of water, acting along the thermocline.

In analogy with the Merian formula, the expected period of the internal wave can be expressed as:

$$T = \frac{2L}{c}$$
with $c^2 = g \frac{\rho_2-\rho_1}{\rho_2} \frac{h_1 h_2}{h_1+h_2}$

where T is the natural period, L is the length of the water body, $h_1, h_2$ the average thicknesses of the two layers separated by stratification (e.g. epilimnion and hypolimnion), $\rho_1, \rho_2$ the densities of these two same layers and g the acceleration of gravity.

As the thermocline moves up and down a sloping lake bed, it creates a 'swash zone', where temperatures can vary rapidly, potentially affecting fish habitat. As the thermocline rises up a sloping lake bed, it can also cause benthic turbulence by convective overturning, whereas the falling thermocline experiences greater stratification and low turbulence at the lake bed. Internal waves can also degenerate into non-linear internal waves on sloping lake-beds. When such non-linear waves break on the lake bed, they can be an important source of turbulence and have the potential for sediment resuspension

=== Cave seiches ===
On September 19, 2022, a seiche reaching 4 feet (1.2 metres) occurred at Devils Hole at Death Valley National Park in the U.S. after a 7.6-magnitude earthquake hit western Mexico, about 1,500 miles (2,400 kilometres) away. Seiches were also observed in the cave after powerful earthquakes in 2012, 2018 and 2019.

== Engineering for seiche protection ==
Engineers consider seiche phenomena in the design of flood protection works (e.g., Saint Petersburg Dam), reservoirs and dams (e.g., Grand Coulee Dam), potable water storage basins, harbours, and even spent nuclear fuel storage basins. Structures and beach-dune systems are particularly vulnerable to damage from high water levels. Wetlands may be severely affected even by small fluctuations in water levels, and therefore historical and predicted water level fluctuations are crucial data for any coastal design. Information on seiches, along with storm surges, and tidal fluctuations is essential.

The period of a seiche depends on the size and depth of the basin in which it occurs. If an incoming wave train has a period similar to the natural frequency of the harbour, each wave will amplify the seiche's intensity, resulting in rougher waters within the harbour compared to the surrounding sea, which can create problems for shipping. The levels of high water in Venice for example, are the result of a combination of storm surge, barometric surge and seiches.

== See also ==
- Clapotis – Non-breaking standing wave pattern
- Earthquake engineering – Study of earthquake-resistant structures
- Severe weather terminology (United States) – Terminology used by the National Weather Service to describe severe weather in the US
- Severe weather terminology (Canada) – Severe weather-related terminology used by the Meteorological Service of Canada
- Tsunamis in lakes
- Villa Epecuén – Abandoned tourist village in Argentina
- Vajont Dam, Disused gravity arch dam in Italy, overtopped by a tsunami in 1963
