= Clapotis =

Non-breaking standing wave pattern

Incoming wave (red) reflected at the wall produces the outgoing wave (blue), both being overlaid resulting in the clapotis (black).

In hydrodynamics, a clapotis (from French for "lapping of water") is a non-breaking standing wave pattern, caused for example, by the reflection of a traveling surface wave train from a near vertical shoreline like a breakwater, seawall or steep cliff. The resulting clapotic wave does not travel horizontally, but has a fixed pattern of nodes and antinodes. These waves promote erosion at the toe of the wall, and can cause severe damage to shore structures. The term was coined in 1877 by French mathematician and physicist Joseph Valentin Boussinesq who called these waves 'le clapotis' meaning "the lapping".

In the idealized case of "full clapotis" where a purely monotonic incoming wave is completely reflected normal to a solid vertical wall, the standing wave height is twice the height of the incoming waves at a distance of one half wavelength from the wall. In this case, the circular orbits of the water particles in the deep-water wave are converted to purely linear motion, with vertical velocities at the antinodes, and horizontal velocities at the nodes. The standing waves alternately rise and fall in a mirror image pattern, as kinetic energy is converted to potential energy, and vice versa. In his 1907 text, Naval Architecture, Cecil Peabody described this phenomenon:

At any instant the profile of the water surface is like that of a trochoidal wave, but the profile instead of appearing to run to the right or left, will grow from a horizontal surface, attain a maximum development, and then flatten out till the surface is again horizontal; immediately another wave profile will form with its crests where the hollows formerly were, will grow and flatten out, etc. If attention is concentrated on a certain crest, it will be seen to grow to its greatest height, die away, and be succeeded in the same place by a hollow, and the interval of time between the successive formations of crests at a given place will be the same as the time of one of the component waves.

== Related phenomena ==
True clapotis is very rare, because the depth of the water or the precipitousness of the shore are unlikely to completely satisfy the idealized requirements. In the more realistic case of partial clapotis, where some of the incoming wave energy is dissipated at the shore, the incident wave is less than 100% reflected, and only a partial standing wave is formed where the water particle motions are elliptical. This may also occur at sea between two different wave trains of near equal wavelength moving in opposite directions, but with unequal amplitudes. In partial clapotis the wave envelope contains some vertical motion at the nodes.

When a wave train strikes a wall at an oblique angle, the reflected wave train departs at the supplementary angle causing a cross-hatched wave interference pattern known as the clapotis gaufré ("waffled clapotis"). In this situation, the individual crests formed at the intersection of the incident and reflected wave train crests move parallel to the structure. This wave motion, when combined with the resultant vortices, can erode material from the seabed and transport it along the wall, undermining the structure until it fails.

Clapotic waves on the sea surface also radiate infrasonic microbaroms into the atmosphere, and seismic signals called microseisms coupled through the ocean floor to the solid Earth.

Clapotis has been called the bane and the pleasure of sea kayaking.

== See also ==
- Rogue wave
- Seiche
