= Aeotana =

The æotana is a small wind instrument made of seven reeds or metal strips fastened in a frame, played by blowing into it. Some African cultures make a similar instrument called a nanga, which is played during royal dances such as the Tshikona.

== See also ==
- Jew's harp
