= Wind instrument =

Class of musical instruments with air resonator

Charles Gounod's Petite Symphonie pour neuf instruments à vent
(Little Symphony for Nine Wind Instruments)
I. Adagio, allegro

II: Andante cantabile

III: Scherzo (Allegro moderato)

IV: Finale (Allegretto)
Performed by the Soni Ventorum Wind Quintet.

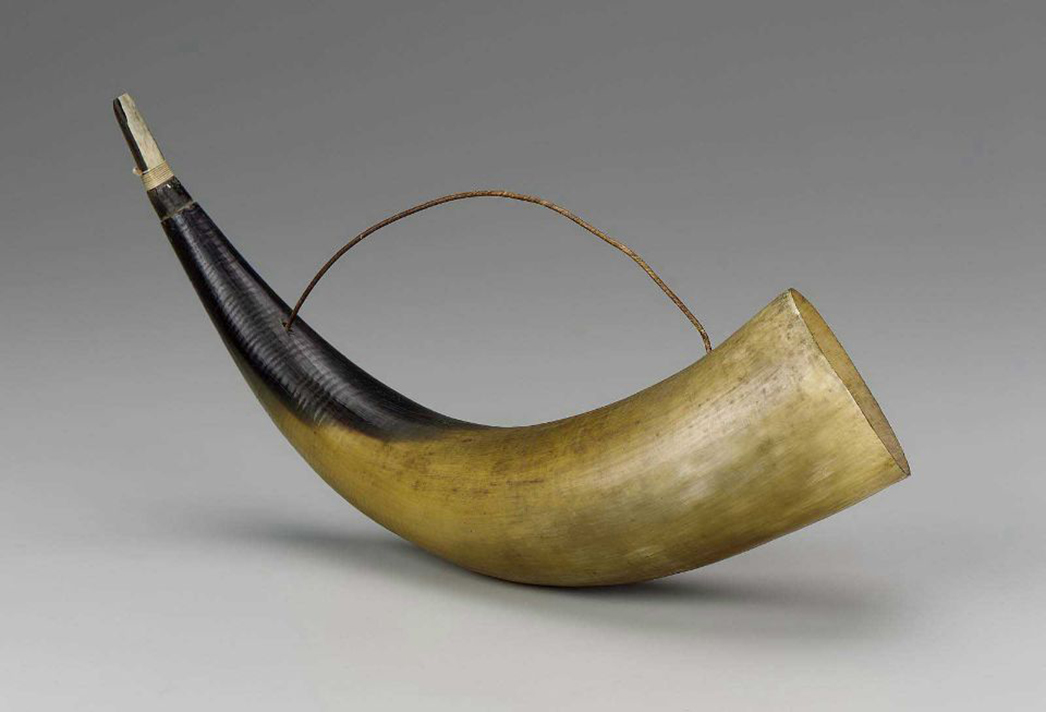
Erke, wind instrument of Argentina

A wind instrument is a musical instrument that contains some type of resonator (usually a tube) in which a column of air is set into vibration by the player blowing into (or over) a mouthpiece set at or near the end of the resonator. The pitch of the vibration is determined by the length of the tube and by manual modifications of the effective length of the vibrating column of air. In the case of some wind instruments, sound is produced by blowing through a reed. Others require buzzing into a metal mouthpiece, while yet others require the player to blow into a hole at an edge, which splits the air column and creates the sound.

== Types ==
Wind instruments are typically grouped into two families:

- Brass instruments (horns, trumpets, trombones, euphoniums, and tubas)
- Woodwind instruments (recorders, flutes, oboes, clarinets, saxophones, and bassoons)

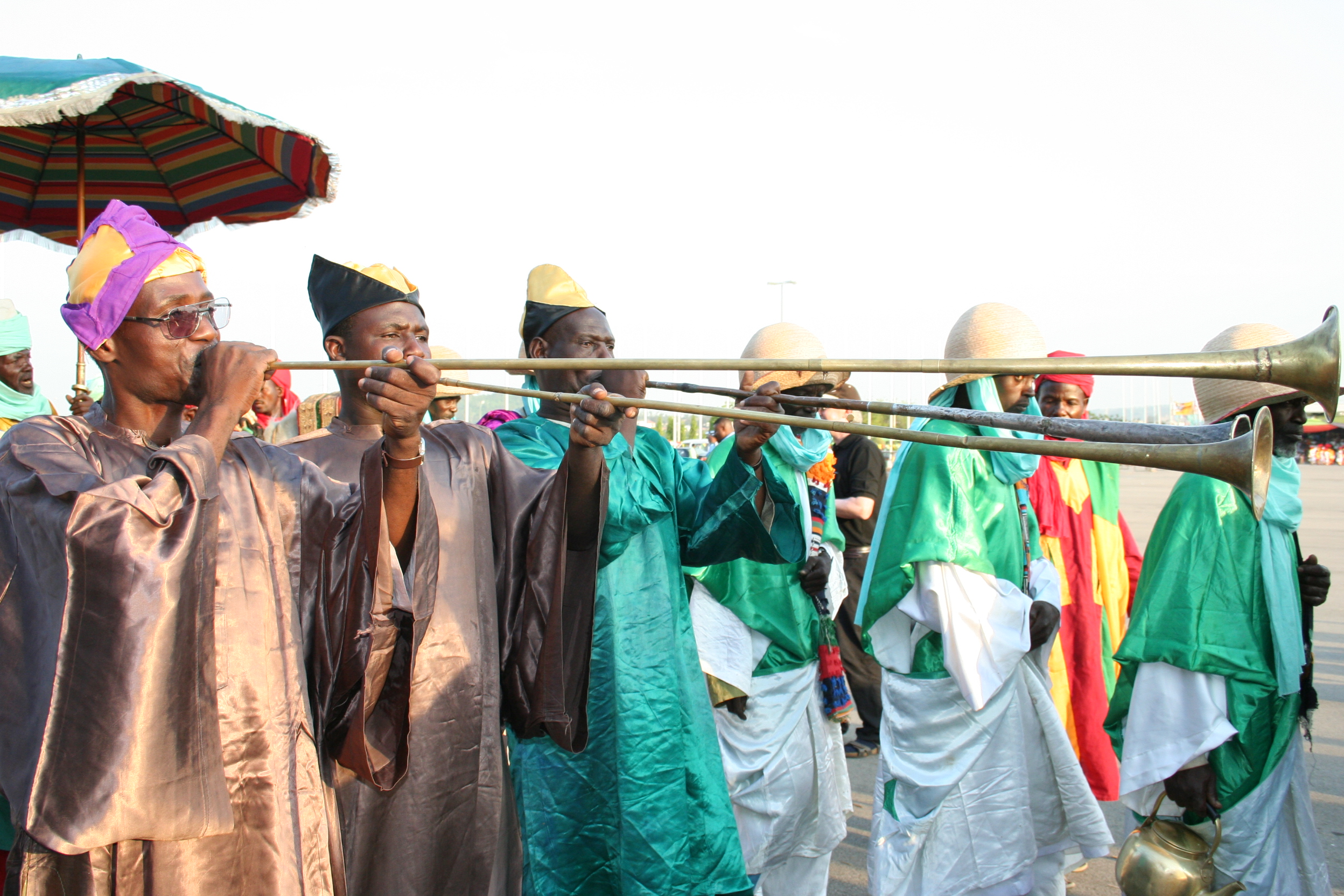
Kakaki players from northern Nigeria

Woodwind instruments were originally made of wood, just as brass instruments were made of brass, but instruments are categorized based on how the sound is produced, not by the material used to construct them. For example, saxophones are typically made of brass, but are woodwind instruments because they produce sound with a vibrating reed. On the other hand, the didgeridoo, the wooden cornett (not to be confused with the cornet), and the serpent are all made of wood (or sometimes plastic), and the olifant is made from ivory, but all of them belong to the family of brass instruments because the vibration is initiated by the player's lips.

- In brass instruments, the player's lips themselves vibrate, causing the air within the instrument to vibrate.
- In woodwind instruments, the player either:
  - causes a reed to vibrate, which agitates the column of air (as in a saxophone, clarinet, oboe or duduk)
  - blows over a fipple, across an open hole against an edge (as in a recorder or ocarina), or
  - blows across the edge of an open hole (as in a flute).

In the Hornbostel-Sachs scheme of musical instrument classification, wind instruments are classed as aerophones.

== Physics of sound production ==
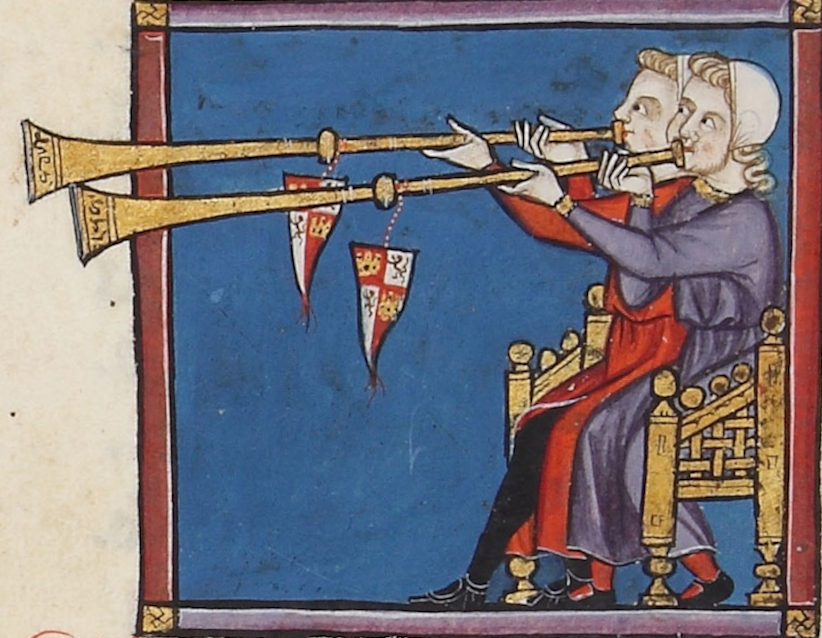
Thirteenth century Spanish depiction of a pair of buisines

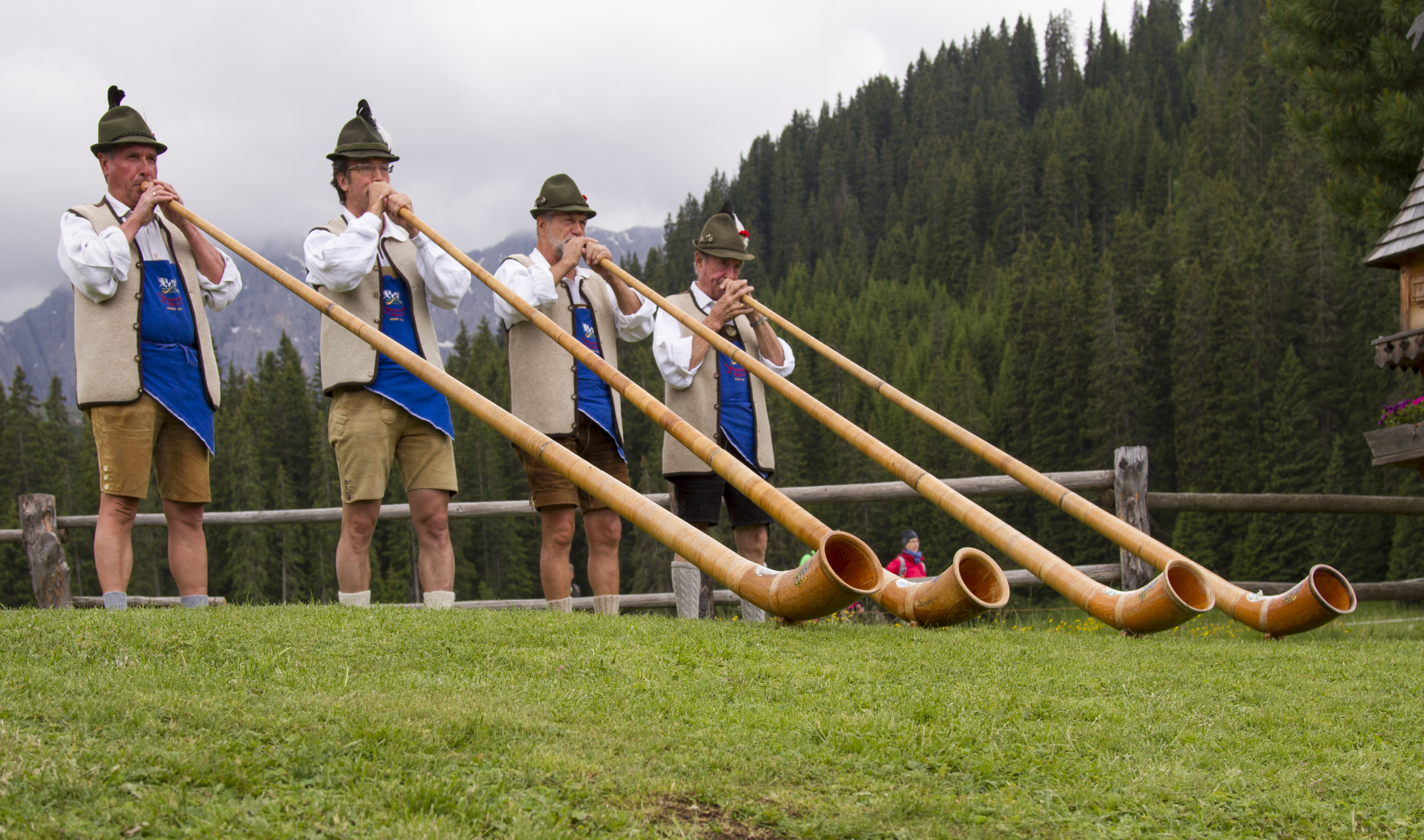
Alphorn players in Seiser Alm, South Tyrol

Sound production in all wind instruments depends on the entry of air into a flow-control valve attached to a resonant chamber (resonator). The resonator is typically a long cylindrical or conical tube, open at the far end. A pulse of high pressure from the valve will travel down the tube at the speed of sound. It will be reflected from the open end as a return pulse of low pressure. Under suitable conditions, the valve will reflect the pulse back, with increased energy, until a standing wave forms in the tube.

Reed instruments such as the clarinet or oboe have a flexible reed or reeds at the mouthpiece, forming a pressure-controlled valve. An increase in pressure inside the chamber will decrease the pressure differential across the reed; the reed will open more, increasing the flow of air. The increased flow of air will increase the internal pressure further, so a pulse of high pressure arriving at the mouthpiece will reflect as a higher-pressure pulse back down the tube. Standing waves inside the tube will be odd multiples of a quarter-wavelength, with a pressure anti-node at the mouthpiece, and a pressure node at the open end. The reed vibrates at a rate determined by the resonator.

For Lip Reed (brass) instruments, the players control the tension in their lips so that they vibrate under the influence of the air flowing through them. They adjust the vibration so that the lips are most closed, and the air flow is lowest, when a low-pressure pulse arrives at the mouthpiece, to reflect a low-pressure pulse back down the tube. Standing waves inside the tube will be odd multiples of a quarter-wavelength, with a pressure anti-node at the mouthpiece, and a pressure node at the open end.

For Air Reed (flute and fipple-flute) instruments, the thin grazing air sheet (planar jet) flowing across an opening (mouth) in the pipe interacts with a sharp edge (labium) to generate sound. The jet is generated by the player, when blowing through a thin slit (flue). For recorders and flue organ pipes this slit is manufactured by the instrument maker and has a fixed geometry. In a transverse flute or a pan flute the slit is formed by the musician between their lips.

Due to acoustic oscillation of the pipe the air in the pipe is alternatively compressed and expanded. This results in an alternating flow of air into and out of the pipe through the pipe mouth. The interaction of this transversal acoustic flow with the planar air jet induces at the flue exit (origin of the jet) a localised perturbation of the velocity profile of the jet. This perturbation is strongly amplified by the intrinsic instability of the jet as the fluid travels towards the labium. This results into a global transversal motion of the jet at the labium.

The amplification of perturbations of a jet by its intrinsic instability can be observed when looking at a plume of cigarette smoke. Any small amplitude motion of the hand holding the cigarette results into an oscillation of the plume increasing with distance upwards and eventually a chaotic motion (turbulence). The same jet oscillation can be triggered by gentle air flow in the room, which can be verified by waving with the other hand.

The oscillation of the jet around the labium results into a fluctuating force of the airflow on the labium. Following the third law of Newton the labium exerts an opposite reaction force on the flow. One can demonstrate that this reaction force is the source of sound that drives the acoustic oscillation of the pipe.

A quantitative demonstration of the nature of this type of sound source has been provided by Alan Powell when studying a planar jet interacting with a sharp edge in the absence of pipe (so called edgetone). The sound radiated from the edgetone can be predicted from a measurement of the unsteady force induced by the jet flow on the sharp edge (labium). The sound production by the reaction of the wall to an unsteady force of the flow around an object is also producing the aeolian sound of a cylinder placed normal to an air-flow (singing wire phenomenon). In all these cases (flute, edgetone, aeolian tone...) the sound production does not involve a vibration of the wall. Hence the material in which the flute is made is not relevant for the principle of the sound production. There is no essential difference between a golden or a silver flute.

The sound production in a flute can be described by a lumped element model in which the pipe acts as an acoustic swing (mass-spring system, resonator) that preferentially oscillates at a natural frequency determined by the length of the tube. The instability of the jet acts as an amplifier transferring energy from the steady jet flow at the flue exit to the oscillating flow around the labium. The pipe forms with the jet a feedback loop. These two elements are coupled at the flue exit and at the labium. At the flue exit the transversal acoustic flow of the pipe perturbs the jet. At the labium the jet oscillation results in a generation of acoustic waves, which maintain the pipe oscillation.

The acoustic flow in the pipe can for a steady oscillation be described in terms of standing waves. These waves have a pressure node at the mouth opening and another pressure node at the opposite open pipe termination. Standing waves inside such an open-open tube will be multiples of a half-wavelength.

To a rough approximation, a tube of about 40 cm. will exhibit resonances near the following points:

- For a reed or lip-reed instrument: 220 Hz (A3), 660 Hz (E5), 1100 Hz (C#6).
- For an air-reed instrument: 440 Hz (A4), 880 Hz (A5), 1320 Hz (E6).

In practice, however, obtaining a range of musically useful tones from a wind instrument depends to a great extent on careful instrument design and playing technique.

The frequency of the vibrational modes depends on the speed of sound in air, which varies with air density. A change in temperature, and only to a much smaller degree also a change in humidity, influences the air density and thus the speed of sound, and therefore affects the tuning of wind instruments. The effect of thermal expansion of a wind instrument, even of a brass instrument, is negligible compared to the thermal effect on the air.

== Methods for obtaining different notes ==
- Using different air columns for different tones, such as in the pan flute. These instruments can play several notes at once.
- Changing the length of the vibrating air column by changing the length of the tube through engaging valves (see rotary valve, piston valve) which route the air through additional tubing, thereby increasing overall tube length, lowering the fundamental pitch. This method is used on nearly all brass instruments.
- Changing the length of the vibrating air column by lengthening and/or shortening the tube using a sliding mechanism. This method is used on the trombone and the slide whistle.
- Changing the frequency of vibration through opening or closing holes in the side of the tube. This can be done by covering the holes with fingers or pressing a key which then closes the hole. This method is used in nearly all woodwind instruments.
- Making the column of air vibrate at different harmonics without changing the length of the column of air (see natural horn and harmonic series).

Almost all wind instruments use the last method, often in combination with one of the others, to extend their register.

== Bell ==
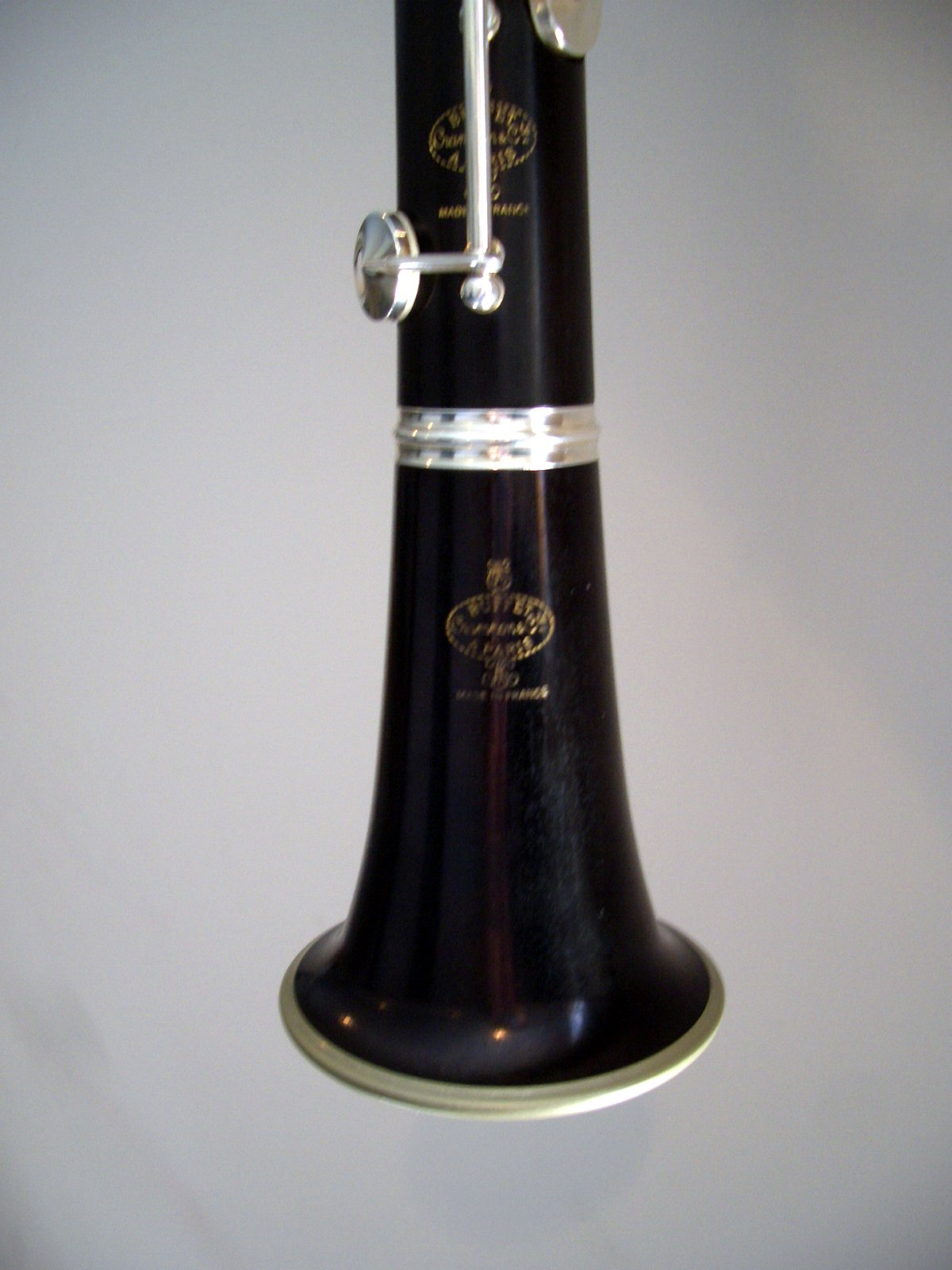
The bell of a B-flat clarinet

The bell of a wind instrument is the round, flared opening opposite the mouthpiece. It is found on clarinets, saxophones, oboes, horns, trumpets and many other kinds of instruments. On brass instruments, the acoustical coupling from the bore to the outside air occurs at the bell for all notes, and the shape of the bell optimizes this coupling. It also plays a major role in transforming the resonances of the instrument. On woodwinds, most notes vent at the uppermost open tone holes; only the lowest notes of each register vent fully or partly at the bell, and the bell's function in this case is to improve the consistency in tone between these notes and the others.

== Breath pressure ==
Playing some wind instruments, in particular those involving high breath pressure resistance, produce increases in intraocular pressure, which has been linked to glaucoma as a potential health risk. One 2011 study focused on brass and woodwind instruments observed "temporary and sometimes dramatic elevations and fluctuations in IOP". Another study found that the magnitude of increase in intraocular pressure correlates with the intraoral resistance associated with the instrument and linked intermittent elevation of intraocular pressure from playing high-resistance wind instruments to incidence of visual field loss. The range of intraoral pressure involved in various classes of ethnic wind instruments, such as Native American flutes, has been shown to be generally lower than Western classical wind instruments.

== See also ==
- Aeotana
- Aerophone
- Concert band
- Shorthand for orchestra instrumentation
