= Faraday wave =

Ripples on liquid within a vibrating receptacle

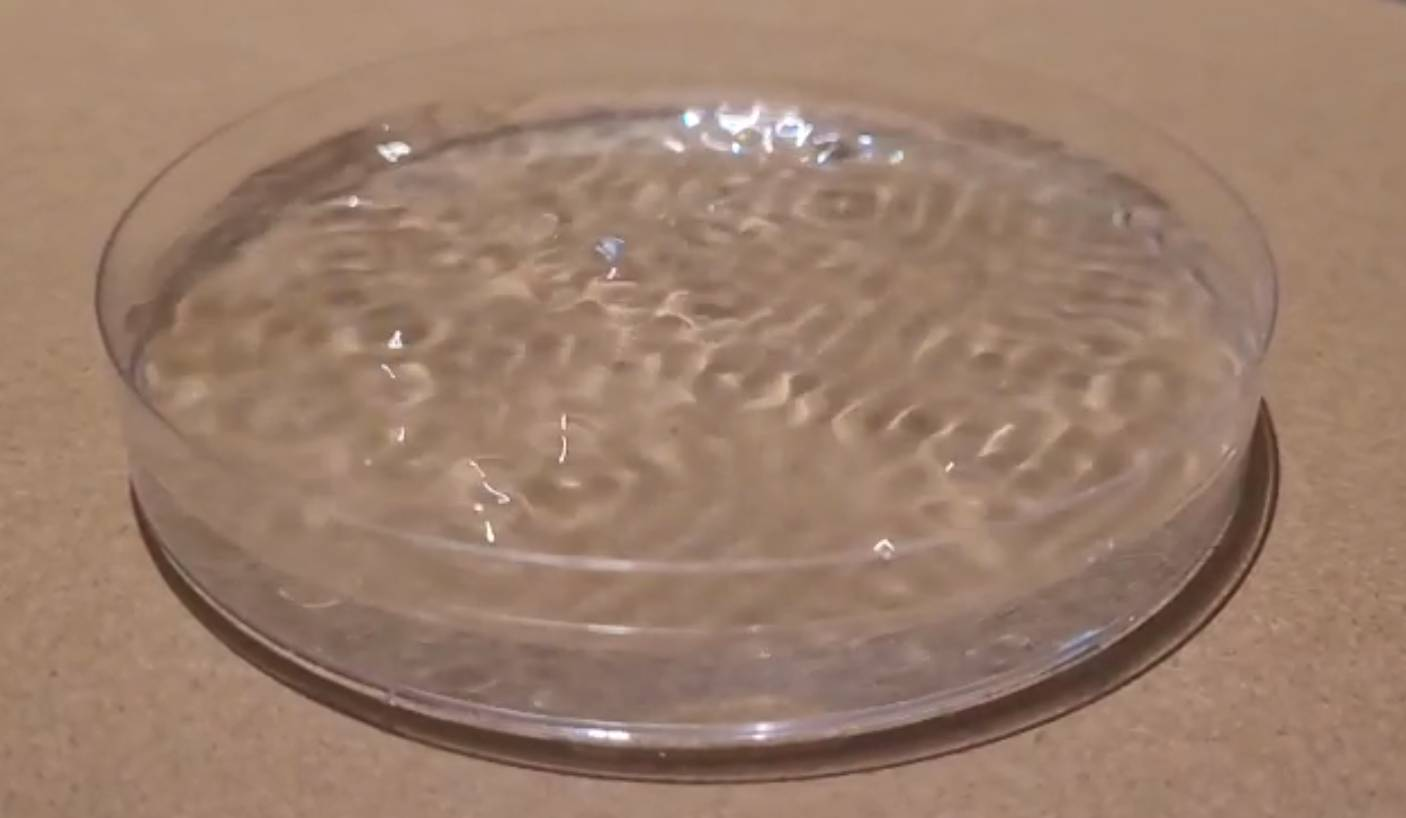
Faraday waves observed in water in a Petri dish, vibrated at a frequency of about 50 hertz.

Faraday waves in a singing bowl

Faraday waves, also known as Faraday ripples, named after Michael Faraday (1791–1867), are nonlinear standing waves that appear on liquids enclosed by a vibrating receptacle. When the vibration frequency exceeds a critical value, the flat hydrostatic surface becomes unstable. This is known as the Faraday instability. Faraday first described them in an appendix to an article in the Philosophical Transactions of the Royal Society of London in 1831.

If a layer of liquid is placed on top of a vertically oscillating piston, a pattern of standing waves appears which oscillates at half the driving frequency, given certain criteria of instability. This relates to the problem of parametric resonance. The waves can take the form of stripes, close-packed hexagons, or even squares or quasiperiodic patterns. Faraday waves are commonly observed as fine stripes on the surface of wine in a wine glass that is ringing like a bell. Faraday waves also explain the 'fountain' phenomenon on a singing bowl.

The Faraday wave and its wavelength is analogous to the de Broglie wave with the de Broglie wavelength in de Broglie–Bohm theory in the field of quantum mechanics.

== Application ==
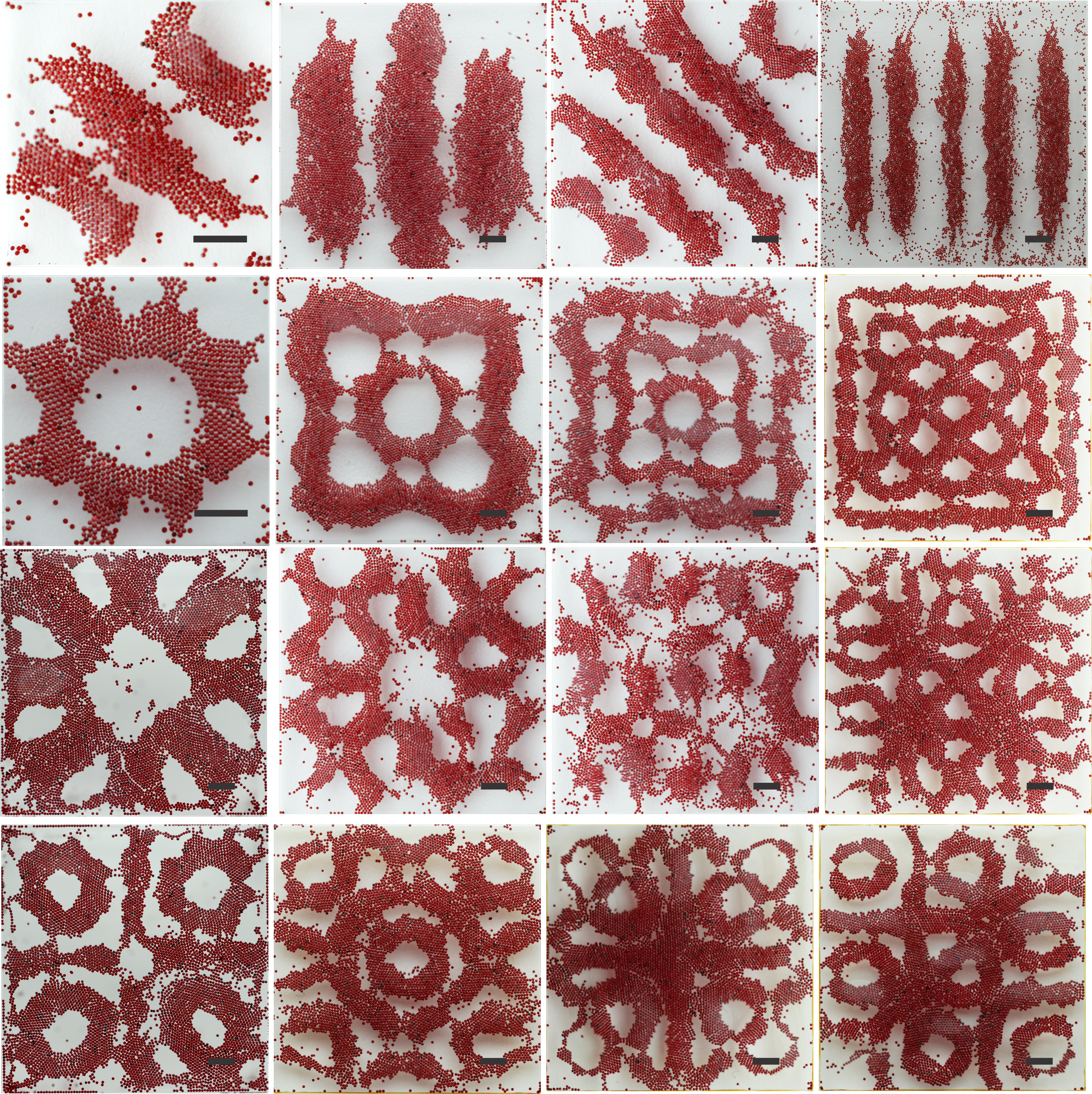
Assembly of microscale materials on Faraday waves.

Faraday waves are used as a liquid-based template for directed assembly of microscale materials including soft matter, rigid bodies, biological entities (e.g., individual cells, cell spheroids and cell-seeded microcarrier beads). Unlike solid-based template, this liquid-based template can be dynamically changed by tuning vibrational frequency and acceleration and generate diverse sets of symmetrical and periodic patterns.

This phenomenon is also used by alligators to call mates. They vibrate their lungs at low frequencies slightly below the surface, causing their spikes to move and induce surface waves. These surface waves are basically Faraday waves and one can observe the splashing effect characteristic of certain resonances.

This effect can also be used for mixing two liquids acoustically. Faraday waves form on the interface between the two liquids, which increases the surface area between the two, rapidly and thoroughly mixing the liquids.

== See also ==
- Chladni patterns
- Cymatics
- Oscillation
- Wave–particle duality
- Matter wave
