= Microbarom =

Class of atmospheric infrasonic waves

In acoustics, microbaroms, also known as the "voice of the sea", are a class of atmospheric infrasonic waves generated in marine storms by a non-linear interaction of ocean surface waves with the atmosphere. They typically have narrow-band, nearly sinusoidal waveforms with amplitudes up to a few microbars, and wave periods near 5 seconds (0.2 hertz). Due to low atmospheric absorption at these low frequencies, microbaroms can propagate thousands of kilometers in the atmosphere, and can be readily detected by widely separated instruments on the Earth's surface.

== History ==
The reason for the discovery of this phenomenon was an accident: aerologists working at marine hydrometeorology stations and watercraft drew attention to the strange pain that a person experiences when approaching the surface of a standard meteorological probe (a balloon filled with hydrogen). During one of the expeditions, this effect was demonstrated to the Soviet academician V. V. Shuleikin by the chief meteorologist V. A. Berezkin. This phenomenon drew genuine interest among scientists; in order to study it, special equipment was designed to record powerful but low-frequency vibrations that are not audible to human ears.

As a result of several series of experiments, the physical essence of this phenomenon was clarified and in 1935 when V.V. Shuleikin published his first work entirely devoted to the infrasonic nature of the “voice of the sea”. Microbaroms were first described in United States in 1939 by American seismologists Hugo Benioff and Beno Gutenberg at the California Institute of Technology at Pasadena, based on observations from an electromagnetic microbarograph, consisting of a wooden box with a low-frequency loudspeaker mounted on top. They noted their similarity to microseisms observed on seismographs, and correctly hypothesized that these signals were the result of low pressure systems in the Northeast Pacific Ocean. In 1945, Swiss geoscientist L. Saxer showed the first relationship of microbaroms with wave height in ocean storms and microbarom amplitudes. Following up on the theory of microseisms by M. S. Longuet-Higgins, Eric S. Posmentier proposed that the oscillations of the center of gravity of the air above the Ocean surface on which the standing waves appear were the source of microbaroms, explaining the doubling of the ocean wave frequency in the observed microbarom frequency. Microbaroms are now understood to be generated by the same mechanism that makes secondary microseisms. The first quantitatively correct theory of microbarom generation is due to L. M. Brekhovskikh who showed that it is the source of microseisms in the ocean that couples to the atmosphere. This explains that most of the acoustic energy propagates near the horizontal direction at the sea level.

== Theory ==
Isolated traveling ocean surface gravity waves radiate only evanescent acoustic waves, and don't generate microbaroms.

The interaction of two trains of surface waves of different frequencies and directions generates wave groups. For waves propagating almost in the same direction, this gives the usual sets of waves that travel at the group speed, which is slower than phase speed of water waves. For typical ocean waves with a period around 10 seconds, this group speed is close to 10 m/s.

In the case of opposite propagation direction the groups travel at a much larger speed, which is now 2π(f_{1} + f_{2})/(k_{1} − k_{2}) with k_{1} and k_{2} the wave numbers of the interacting water waves. For wave trains with a very small difference in frequency (and thus wave numbers), this pattern of wave groups may have the same horizontal velocity as acoustic waves, more than 300 m/s, and will excite microbaroms.

Wave groups generated by waves with opposing directions. The blue curve is the sum of the red and black. In the animation, watch the crests with the red and black dots. These crests move with the phase speed of linear water waves, but the groups propagate much faster. (Animation)

As far as seismic and acoustic waves are concerned, the motion of ocean waves in deep water is, to the leading order, equivalent to a pressure applied at the sea surface. This pressure is nearly equal to the water density times the wave orbital velocity squared. Because of this square, it is not the amplitude of the individual wave trains that matter (red and black lines in the figures) but the amplitude of the sum, the wave groups (blue line in figures). The ocean motion generated by this "equivalent pressure" is then transmitted to the atmosphere.

If the wave groups travel faster than the sound speed, microbaroms are generated, with propagation directions closer to the vertical for the faster wave groups.

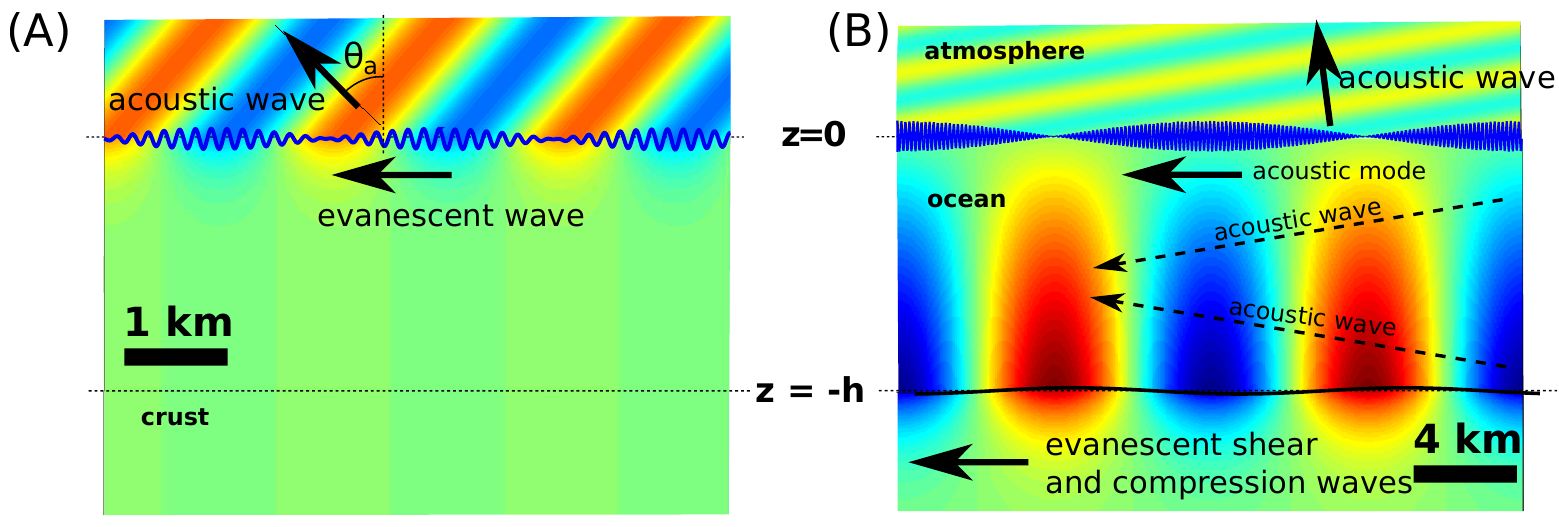
Pressure field in the ocean and atmosphere associated to groups made by opposing wave trains. Left: short wave groups giving oblique propagation in the atmosphere. Right: long wave groups giving nearly vertical propagation in the atmosphere.

Real ocean waves are composed of an infinite number of wave trains of all directions and frequencies, giving a broad range of acoustic waves. In practice, the transmission from the ocean to the atmosphere is strongest for angles around 0.5 degrees from the horizontal. For near-vertical propagation, the water depth may play an amplifying role as it does for microseisms.

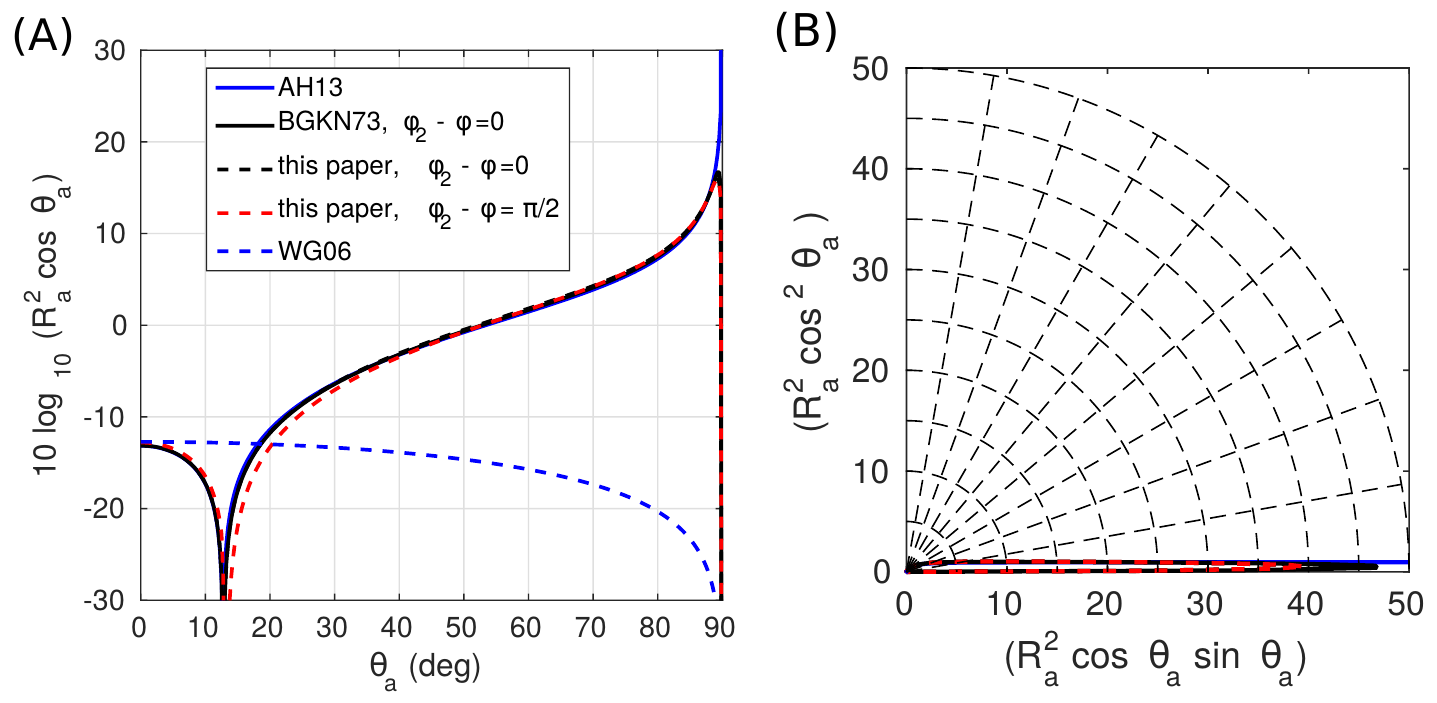
Acoustic power per solid angle radiated as microbarom by ocean waves. Left: log scale as a function of the elevation angle (zero is vertical). Right: linear scale in polar coordinates.

The water depth is only important for those acoustic waves that have a propagation direction within 12° of the vertical at the sea surface

There is always some energy propagating in the opposite direction. However, their energy may be extremely low. Significant microbarom generation only occurs when there is significant energy at the same frequency and in opposing directions. This is strongest when waves from different storms interact or in the lee of a storm which produce the required standing wave conditions, also known as the clapotis. When the ocean storm is a tropical cyclone, the microbaroms are not produced near the eye wall where wind speeds are greatest, but originate from the trailing edge of the storm where the storm generated waves interact with the ambient ocean swells.

Microbaroms may also be produced by standing waves created between two storms, or when an ocean swell is reflected at the shore. Waves with approximately 10-second periods are abundant in the open oceans, and correspond to the observed 0.2 Hz infrasonic spectral peak of microbaroms, because microbaroms exhibit frequencies twice that of the individual ocean waves. Studies have shown that the coupling produces propagating atmospheric waves only when non-linear terms are considered.

Microbaroms are a form of persistent low-level atmospheric infrasound, generally between 0.1 and 0.5 Hz, that may be detected as coherent energy bursts or as a continuous oscillation. When the plane wave arrivals from a microbarom source are analyzed from a phased array of closely spaced microbarographs, the source azimuth is found to point toward the low-pressure center of the originating storm. When the waves are received at multiple distant sites from the same source, triangulation can confirm the source is near the center of an ocean storm.

Microbaroms that propagate up to the lower thermosphere may be carried in an atmospheric waveguide, refracted back toward the surface from below 120 km and above 150 km altitudes, or dissipated at altitudes between 110 and 140 km. They may also be trapped near the surface in the lower troposphere by planetary boundary layer effects and surface winds, or they may be ducted in the stratosphere by upper-level winds and returned to the surface through refraction, diffraction or scattering. These tropospheric and stratospheric ducts are only generated along the dominant wind directions, may vary by time of day and season, and will not return the sound rays to the ground when the upper winds are light.

The angle of incidence of the microbarom ray determines which of these propagation modes it experiences. Rays directed vertically toward the zenith are dissipated in the thermosphere, and are a significant source of heating in that layer of the upper atmosphere. At mid latitudes in typical summer conditions, rays between approximately 30 and 60 degrees from the vertical are reflected from altitudes above 125 km where the return signals are strongly attenuated first. Rays launched at shallower angles may be reflected from the upper stratosphere at approximately 45 km above the surface in mid-latitudes, or from 60 to 70 km in low latitudes.

== Microbaroms and upper atmosphere ==
Atmospheric scientists have used these effects for inverse remote sensing of the upper atmosphere using microbaroms. Measuring the trace velocity of the reflected microbarom signal at the surface gives the propagation velocity at the reflection height, as long as the assumption that the speed of sound only varies along the vertical, and not over the horizontal, is valid. If the temperature at the reflection height can be estimated with sufficient precision, the speed of sound can be determined and subtracted from the trace velocity, giving the upper-level wind speed. One advantage of this method is the ability to measure continuously – other methods that can only take instantaneous measurements may have their results distorted by short-term effects.

Additional atmospheric information can be deduced from microbarom amplitude if the source intensity is known. Microbaroms are produced by upward directed energy transmitted from the ocean surface through the atmosphere. The downward directed energy is transmitted through the ocean to the sea floor, where it is coupled to the Earth's crust and transmitted as microseisms with the same frequency spectrum. However, unlike microbaroms, where the near vertical rays are not returned to the surface, only the near vertical rays in the ocean are coupled to the sea floor. By monitoring the amplitude of received microseisms from the same source using seismographs, information on the source amplitude can be derived. Because the solid earth provides a fixed reference frame, the transit time of the microseisms from the source is constant, and this provides a control for the variable transit time of the microbaroms through the moving atmosphere.

== Microbaroms and nuclear explosions ==
Microbaroms are a significant noise source that can potentially interfere with the detection of infrasound from nuclear explosions. Accurate detection of explosions is a goal of the International Monitoring System organized under the Comprehensive Nuclear-Test-Ban Treaty (which has not entered into force). It is a particular problem for detecting low-yield tests in the one-kiloton range because the frequency spectra overlap.

== See also ==
- Microseism
