= Infragravity wave =

Surface gravity waves with frequencies lower than the wind waves

Infragravity waves are surface gravity waves with frequencies lower than the wind waves – consisting of both wind sea and swell – thus corresponding with the part of the wave spectrum lower than the frequencies directly generated by forcing through the wind.

Infragravity waves are ocean surface gravity waves generated by ocean waves of shorter periods. The amplitude of infragravity waves is most relevant in shallow water, in particular along coastlines hit by high amplitude and long period wind waves and ocean swells. Wind waves and ocean swells are shorter, with typical dominant periods of 1 to 25 s. In contrast, the dominant period of infragravity waves is typically 80 to 300 s, which is close to the typical periods of tsunamis, with which they share similar propagation properties including very fast celerities in deep water. This distinguishes infragravity waves from normal oceanic gravity waves, which are created by wind acting on the surface of the sea, and are slower than the generating wind.

Whatever the details of their generation mechanism, discussed below, infragravity waves are these subharmonics of the impinging gravity waves.

Classification of the spectrum of ocean waves according to wave period.

Technically infragravity waves are simply a subcategory of gravity waves and refer to all gravity waves with periods greater than 30 s. This could include phenomena such as tides and oceanic Rossby waves, but the common scientific usage is limited to gravity waves that are generated by groups of wind waves.

The term "infragravity wave" appears to have been coined by Walter Munk in 1950.

== Generation ==
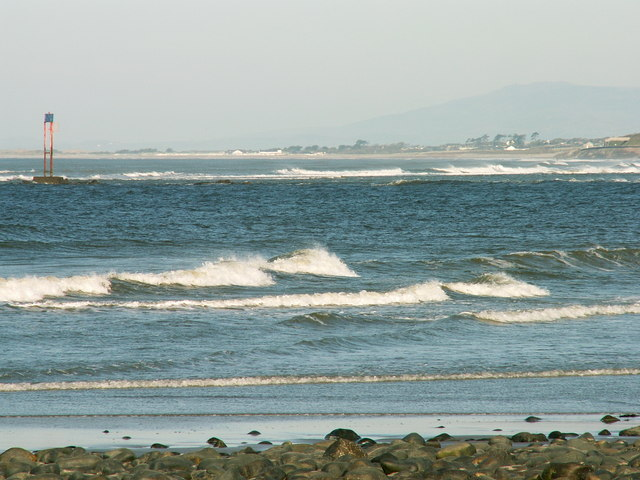
Surf can be seen breaking as it crosses the sand bar offshore. Sandbars aid in generating infragravity waves and in turn are shaped by them.

Two main processes can explain the transfer of energy from the short wind waves to the long infragravity waves, and both are important in shallow water and for steep wind waves. The most common process is the subharmonic interaction of trains of wind waves which was first observed by Munk and Tucker and explained by Longuet-Higgins and Stewart. Because wind waves are not monochromatic they form groups. The Stokes drift induced by these groupy waves transports more water where the waves are highest. The waves also push the water around in a way that can be interpreted as a force: the divergence of the radiation stresses. Combining mass and momentum conservation, Longuet-Higgins and Stewart give, with three different methods, the now well-known result. Namely, the mean sea level oscillates with a wavelength that is equal to the length of the group, with a low level where the wind waves are highest and a high level where these waves are lowest. This oscillation of the sea surface is proportional to the square of the short wave amplitude and becomes very large when the group speed approaches the speed of shallow water waves. The details of this process are modified when the bottom is sloping, which is generally the case near the shore, but the theory captures the important effect, observed in most conditions, that the high water of this 'surf beat' arrives with the waves of lowest amplitude.

Another process was proposed later by Graham Symonds and his collaborators. To explain some cases in which this phase of long and short waves were not opposed, they proposed that the position of the breaker line in the surf, moving towards deep water when waves are higher, could act like a wave maker. It appears that this is probably a good explanation for infragravity wave generation on a reef.

In the case of coral reefs, the infragravity periods are established by resonances with the reef itself.

Ice shelf processes.

== Impact ==
Infragravity waves are thought to be a generating mechanism behind sneaker waves, unusually large and long-duration waves that cause water to surge far onshore and that have killed a number of people in the US Pacific Northwest.

Infragravity waves generated along the Pacific coast of North America have been observed to propagate transoceanically to Antarctica and there to impinge on the Ross Ice Shelf. Their frequencies more closely couple with the ice shelf natural frequencies and they produce a larger amplitude ice shelf movement than the normal ocean swell of gravity waves. Further, they are not damped by sea ice as normal ocean swell is. As a result, they flex floating ice shelves such as the Ross Ice Shelf; this flexure contributes significantly to the breakup on the ice shelf.

== See also ==
- Coastal morphodynamics
