= Joel Mandelbaum =

American music composer and teacher (born 1932)

Mayer Joel Mandelbaum (born October 12, 1932) is an American music composer and teacher, best known for his use of microtonal tuning (notably just intonation and 19 equal temperament and the 31 equal temperament). He wrote the first Ph.D. dissertation on microtonality in 1961. He is married to stained glass artist Ellen Mandelbaum, and is the nephew of Abraham Edel.

== Career ==
Born in New York City, Mandelbaum received his Ph.D. from Indiana University School of Music in music theory in 1961. He also studied at the Harvard and Brandeis universities, as well as the Berkshire Music Center and the Berlin Hochschule für Musik. His composition teachers included Boris Blacher, Luigi Dallapiccola, Irving Fine, Walter Piston, and Harold Shapero. His thesis was focused on the 19 equal temperament. He was a teacher and chairman of the music department at Queens College, City University of New York, from 1961 to 1999.

Mandelbaum became interested in microtonality after listening to a lecture by Paul Hindemith in which Hindemith inadequately debunked various alternative forms of tuning. He began a correspondence with Adriaan Fokker which led to a six-week stay in Haarlem, Netherlands, in 1963, during which he composed music using Euler's genera under Fokker's tutelage. The result was 10 Studies in 31-Tone Temperament, which premiered on the Fokker organ in Haarlem.

Mandelbaum's motivation to use the 31 equal temperament arose from its close approximation to just intonation; Mandelbaum preferred the equal temperament to just tuning out of convenience, as it produced one tuning of a keyboard with which it was possible to explore approximations of chords to just tuning in any key. Although well known for exploring alternate tunings, Mandelbaum still uses conventional tuning in about 80% of his music. Mandelbaum attributes his use of conventional tuning to his reluctance to use keyed instruments (such as woodwinds) in tunings other than those that they were designed for.

Mandelbaum's music has been recorded on Capstone and Ravello Records (PARMA Recordings).
