= Fabio Costa (composer, conductor) =

Brazilian conductor

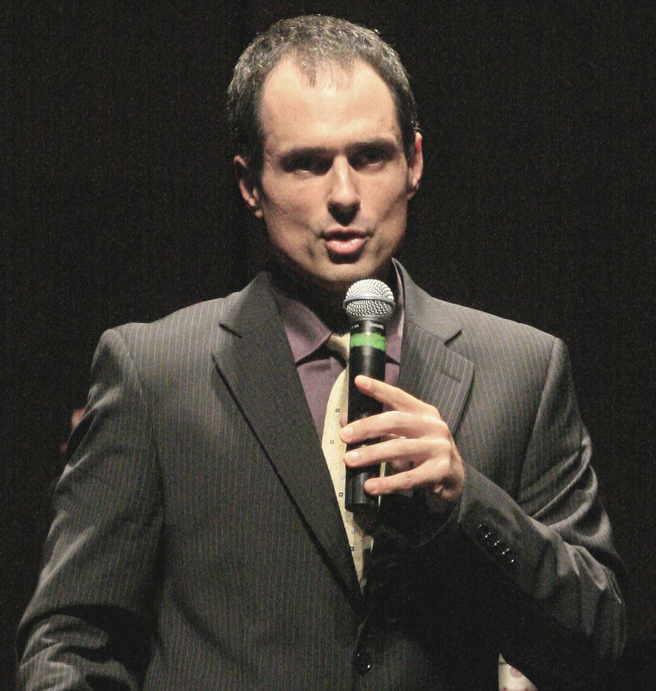
Fabio Costa speaks to audience during a symphonic concert.

Fabio Costa (Fábio Ciglioni Martins Costa, 4 December 1971) is a Brazilian-born composer, conductor and pianist. He is also active as a composer of microtonal music.

== Early life and musical education ==
Fabio Costa was born in São Paulo, Brazil, to an engineer father and a psychologist mother, with family roots in Portugal and Italy (Costa is a dual Brazilian/Italian citizen). He was partly raised in Germany (1982–1984). His grandfather Waldemar Ciglioni was a popular radiophonic actor in his time, and great-grandfather Armando Ciglioni, a neapolitan-song composer/impresario and violinist at the São Paulo Opera House.

Costa started out musically self-taught at age 9 (piano and composition) deciding by age 14 to become a professional musician; he learned the oboe at age 16 and was active for the next 8 years as an orchestral oboist, chamber musician and soloist. He earned a bachelor's degree in oboe performance in 1995 and after a year of oboe studies at the Franz Liszt Academy of Budapest (1995–1996), he decided to pursue a career as a conductor.

Between 1996 and 1999 Costa studied at the Vienna Music Academy (opera and orchestral conducting in the class Uros Lajovic) with a scholarship of the Brazilian Government; he was also coached by Kurt Masur (São Paulo 2001 and 2003), Leonard Slatkin (National Conducting Institute, Washington DC, 2001) and Gianluigi Gelmetti (Accademia Chigiana, Siena Italy, 2005).

== Conductor ==
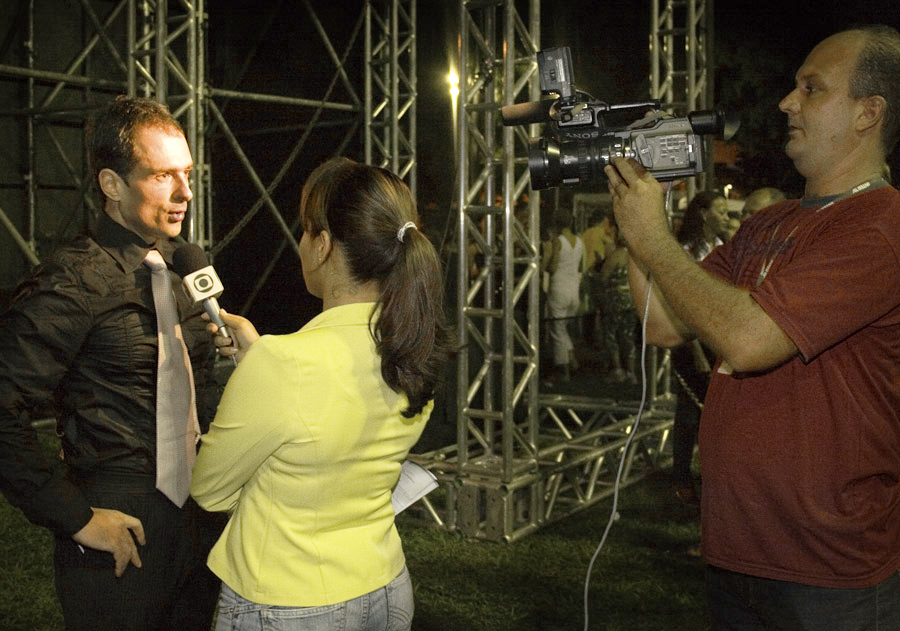
Fabio Costa, Brazilian-born conductor, is interviewed after an open-air concert in Montes Claros, MG, Brazil, in April 2008.

Costa won the 1995 Conducting Competition of the São Paulo Symphony Orchestra and led his first concert with a program including Beethoven's 5th Symphony and Sibelius' Violin Concerto. During his studies, he conducted the premiere of "The Metamorphosis" by B. R. Deutsch, (coaching and conducting, Vienna Music Academy).

He began his professional career in 1999 with the Symphony in Ribeirão Preto, Brazil and served subsequently (2000–2003) as Associate Conductor of the Spokane Symphony Orchestra and Director of Orchestras at Eastern Washington University., having conducted about 70 concerts there.

Acting mainly as a guest conductor between 2004 and 2007, he appeared with the Orquestra Petrobrás Sinfonica, São Paulo University Orchestra, Paraná State Orchestra, São Paulo City Youth Orchestra (Orquestra Experimental de Repertório), São Paulo State Youth Orchestra, São Paulo Radio Orchestra (extinct). Orquestra Amazonas Filarmônica, Mendoza Symphony Orchestra.

Between 2008 and 2009, Costa participated in establishing the Minas Gerais Philharmonic, a major Brazilian orchestra, as its Associate Conductor. In that position, he conducted over 60 concert performances throughout federal state of Minas Gerais. This effort reached an audience of over 80.000 people in over 30 locations statewide, mostly with free access to the public at large, including a relevant number of under-privileged communities in various state regions.

Costa was a guest conductor of the 2007 Manaus Opera House Opera Festival where he coached for "Gianni Schicchi", "La Gioconda", "Othello", "Werther" and also conducted, "Fosca" (Carlos Gomes). At the Palácio das Artes in Belo Horizonte he coached and conducted Macbeth (Verdi) ).

As a Répétiteur in the faculty of the University of Music and Theatre Leipzig, Costa coached and conducted opera-studio productions of "Postcard form Morocco“ (Dominick Argento) in 2018, "Le Portrait de Manon“ (Massenet) in 2019, "Hin und Zurück“ (Hindemith), "Schwergewicht…“ (Krenek) "Fürwahr“ and "Witwe von Ephesus“ (K. A. Hartmann) in 2020.

Costa has conducted about 350 performances to an estimated audience of over 150,000 attendants throughout his career.

== Composer ==
Among his earlier works, the choral cantata "Psalms for the Earth" has been awarded the 2008 Composition Prize of the Brazilian Music Academy (II Prêmio Cláudio Santoro, 2008); this work already explored higher harmonic limits by employing 19-limit just-intonation techniques. The electronic work "Excerpt from Meditation" (2009) continued that path, exploring in 19-limit just-intonation (through an unequal division of the octave in 120 parts). He conducted his own "Prelude for Orchestra" in 2009. In 2010, Costa's orchestral Work "In Four Dimensions" was a winner of the Composition Prize of the Brazilian National Foundation for the Arts (FUNARTE), within the 2011 Biennale of Brazilian Contemporary Music being performed by the UFF National Symphony Orchestra.

He continued to explore microtonality in just-intonation ("O Cravo Brigou com a Rosa" 2010 ) but also 31-ED2 (soundtrack to "Potsdam in Time-Lapse" 2015 ), a tuning system that allows for good approximation in higher harmonic limits and enharmonic modulation. This research ensued in an ongoing collaboration with the Huygens-Fokker Foundation starting in 2015 at the Muziekgebow aan t'Ij in Amsterdam with the composition and performance of "Aphoristic Madrigals" for SATB soli and Fokker-Organ by the ensemble Vokalprojekt 31, especially formed at this occasion. In 2017 "...and while there he sighs...." was commissioned and performed at the same venue, both works again in 2019.

In this period Costa also started venturing into harmonic microtonal performance with the use of isomorphic or generalized keyboards in various tuning systems - such as unequal and equal divisions of the octave and just-intonation ("Improvisation" . At the same time, he saw audio-design and virtual recordings as a means to realize new microtonal works ("....and while there he sighs...." adaptive just-intonation, orchestral version: _{video,} "Meditation" in 19-ED2 ) and also to put older musical works (e.g. by Gesualdo Bach or Hába into new harmonic perspective, particularly with the use of 19-tone-equal-temperament.

Recent developments of this compositional work include the research of difference tones and arithmetic frequency sequences ("Etude on Difference Tones: Minor Thirds" 2022 ) but also the ability to perform microtonally with the use of the electronic wind instrument (EWI) ("Short Piece in 72-ED2", 2022 )

== Collaborative Pianist ==
Having started out as a pianist, Fabio Costa collaborated from the piano throughout his life, particularly in the German Lied repertoire. After relocating to Germany, Costa took up faculty positions as a pianist in the vocal departments of the University of Music and Theatre Leipzig (2016–2021) as well as the Berlin University of the Arts (2016–2019), also acting as a Répétiteur for opera productions such as "Kommilitonen" (Peter M. Davies), "Ende einer Zeit" and "Der Landartzt" (H.W.Henze), "La Verità in Cimento" (Vivaldi) in Leipzig and in Berlin "La voix Humaine" (Poulenc), "Angelique" (Ibert), "L’heure Espagnole" (Ravel) and "Angels in America" (Peter Eötvös).

In addition to private coaching, Costa has also been intensively active as a vocal accompanist with various partners and especially for the so-called Chanson or Kabarett-song, collaborating in particular with the notorious German Brecht specialist and interpret Gina Pietsch,.

== List of works ==
=== Piano ===
"12 Bagatelles" for piano (1996)
"Prelude for piano" (2002)
"Fantasia Polifonica Sopra 'O Cravo Brigou com a Rosa' " for four-hand piano (1997)
"3 Short Polyphonic Pieces" for piano (1999–2000)
"Eclogue" for piano (2002)
"Etude" for piano (2003)
"Fuga a 4" for piano (2002)
"Sospiri" for piano (2003)
"Papillon: Brief Life and Death of a Butterfly" for piano (2002)
"Valsa Lenta em Tons Terra" for piano (2004)
"Second Prelude" for piano (2006)

=== Organ ===
"Prelude-Meditation" for organ (2006)
"Second Prelude" for organ (2006/2015)
"3 Short Polyphonic Pieces" for organ (1999/2015)
"Papillon: Short Life and Death of a Butterfly" for organ (2002/2017)

=== Instrumental Chamber ===
"Prelude and Fugue" for hiano, horn and violoncello (1987)
"2 Lieder" for piano, oboe and voice (1988)
"3 Phantasiestücke" for clarinet or viola and piano (1992)
"Nonett" – 1994
"Fuga" for brass quintet (2002/2012)
"Ricercare" for 4 French horns and 2 pianos

=== Vocal ===
"3 Late Romantic Songs" after Rilke and Trakl–1996
"Meine Frühverliehenen Lieder" (Lied, after Rilke), for Sopran or Tenor and string orchestra (1996/2012)
"Aphoristic Madrigal" for SATB and 31-tone Organ (2015)
"....and while there he sighs" after Ovid in 31-ED2 (2017) for 31-tone Fokker-orcgan and alto voice solo
"Missa Brevis" for high soprano and orchestra (2017)
"Der Choral vom Manne Baal" after Brecht for piano and voice (2022)

=== String Orchestra ===
"Suite for Strings" (2018)

=== Orchestra ===
"Der Tod des Dichters" (Symphonic Poem nach Rilke) (1991)
"Eclogue" for Orchestra (2002)
"Reminiscences" for Orchestra (2004/2009/2014)
"Prelude for Orchestra" (2007)
"Essay for Orchestra" (2007)
"In Four Dimensions" (2011) for orchestra

=== Soloist and Orchestra ===
"3 Late Romantic Lieder" after Rilke and Trakl for Sopran or Tenor and Orchestra (1996/1998)
"Worlds Between Worlds" (2014) concert piece for violin and orchestra
"Der Choral vom Manne Baal" after Brecht for orchestra and voice (2022)

=== Choral ===
"Psalms for the Earth" for SATB solo, Choir SATB, obligato percussion quartet, Organ and Orchestra (2007)

=== Electronic ===
"Fragment from Meditation" in 19-limit just-intonation (2008)
"O Cravo Brigou com a Rosa" harmonization in just-intonation (2010)
"Meditation" in 19-ED2 (2018)
"....and while there he sighs...." in adaptive just-intonation from 31-ED2 (2018) for symphony orchestra
"Enharmonic Study" in 31-ED2 (2019)
"Etude on Difference Tones: 'Minor Thirds' " (2022)
"Short Piece" in 72-ED2 (2022/2023)
