= Microtonality =

Use in music of microtones (intervals smaller than a semitone)

Composer Charles Ives chose the chord above as a good candidate for a "fundamental" chord in the quarter tone scale, akin not to the tonic but to the major chord of traditional tonality

Two examples of an Ives fundamental chord with quarter tones

Microtonality is the use in music of microtones — intervals smaller than a semitone, also called "microintervals". It may also be extended to include any music using intervals not found in the customary Western tuning of twelve equal intervals per octave. In other words, a microtone may be thought of as a note that falls "between the keys" of a piano tuned in equal temperament.

== Terminology ==
=== Microtone ===
Quarter tone accidentals residing outside the Western semitone:
quarter tone flat, flat, (two variants of) three quarter tones flat;
quarter tone sharp, sharp, three quarter tones sharp

Microtonal music can refer to any music containing microtones. The words "microtone" and "microtonal" were coined before 1912 by Maud MacCarthy Mann in order to avoid the misnomer "quarter tone" when speaking of the srutis of Indian music. Prior to this time the term "quarter tone" was used, confusingly, not only for an interval actually half the size of a semitone, but also for all intervals (considerably) smaller than a semitone. It may have been even slightly earlier, perhaps as early as 1895, that the Mexican composer Julián Carrillo, writing in Spanish or French, coined the terms microtono/micro-ton and microtonalismo/micro-tonalité.

In French, the usual term is the somewhat more self-explanatory micro-intervalle, and French sources give the equivalent German and English terms as Mikrointervall (or Kleinintervall) and micro interval (or microtone), respectively. "Microinterval" is a frequent alternative in English, especially in translations of writings by French authors and in discussion of music by French composers. In English, the two terms "microtone" and "microinterval" are synonymous. The English analogue of the related French term, micro-intervalité, however, is rare or nonexistent, normally being translated as "microtonality"; in French, the terms micro-ton, microtonal (or micro-tonal), and microtonalité are also sometimes used, occasionally mixed in the same passage with micro-intervale and micro-intervalité.

Ezra Sims, in the article "Microtone" in the second edition of the Harvard Dictionary of Music defines "microtone" as "an interval smaller than a semitone", which corresponds with Aristoxenus's use of the term diesis. However, the unsigned article "Comma, Schisma" in the same reference source calls comma, schisma, and diaschisma "microintervals" but not "microtones", and in the fourth edition of the same reference (which retains Sims's article on "Microtone") a new "Comma, Schisma" article by André Barbera calls them simply "intervals". In the second edition of The New Grove Dictionary of Music and Musicians, Paul Griffiths, Mark Lindley, and Ioannis Zannos define "microtone" as a musical rather than an acoustical entity: "any musical interval or difference of pitch distinctly smaller than a semitone", including "the tiny enharmonic melodic intervals of ancient Greece, the several divisions of the octave into more than 12 parts, and various discrepancies among the intervals of just intonation or between a sharp and its enharmonically paired flat in various forms of mean-tone temperament", as well as the Indian sruti, and small intervals used in Byzantine chant, Arabic music theory from the 10th century onward, and similarly for Persian traditional music and Turkish music and various other Near Eastern musical traditions, but do not actually name the "mathematical" terms schisma, comma, and diaschisma.

"Microtone" is also sometimes used to refer to individual notes, "microtonal pitches" added to and distinct from the familiar twelve notes of the chromatic scale, as "enharmonic microtones", for example.

In English the word "microtonality" is mentioned in 1946 by Rudi Blesh who related it to microtonal inflexions of the so-called "blues scales". In Court B. Cutting's 2019 Microtonal Analysis of "Blues Notes" and the Blues Scale, he states that academic studies of the early blues concur that its pitch scale has within it three microtonal "blue notes" not found in 12 tone equal temperament intonation. It was used still earlier by W. McNaught with reference to developments in "modernism" in a 1939 record review of the Columbia History of Music, Vol. 5. In German the term Mikrotonalität came into use at least by 1958, though "Mikrointervall" is still common today in contexts where very small intervals of early European tradition (diesis, comma, etc.) are described, as e.g. in the new Geschichte der Musiktheorie while "Mikroton" seems to prevail in discussions of the avant-garde music and music of Eastern traditions. The term "microinterval" is used alongside "microtone" by American musicologist Margo Schulter in her articles on medieval music.

=== Microtonal ===
The term "microtonal music" usually refers to music containing very small intervals but can include any tuning that differs from Western twelve-tone equal temperament. Traditional Indian systems of 22 śruti; Indonesian gamelan music; Thai, Burmese, and African music, and music using just intonation, meantone temperament or other alternative tunings may be considered microtonal. Microtonal variation of intervals is standard practice in the African-American musical forms of spirituals, blues, and jazz.

Many microtonal equal divisions of the octave have been proposed, usually (but not always) in order to achieve approximation to the intervals of just intonation.

Terminology other than "microtonal" has been used or proposed by some theorists and composers. In 1914, A. H. Fox Strangways objected that "'heterotone' would be a better name for śruti than the usual translation 'microtone'". Modern Indian researchers yet write: "microtonal intervals called shrutis". In Germany, Austria, and Czechoslovakia in the 1910s and 1920s the usual term continued to be Viertelton-Musik (quarter tone music), and the type of intervallic structure found in such music was called the Vierteltonsystem, which was (in the mentioned region) regarded as the main term for referring to music with microintervals, though as early as 1908 Georg Capellan had qualified his use of "quarter tone" with the alternative term "Bruchtonstufen (Viertel- und Dritteltöne)" (fractional degrees (quarter and third tones)). Despite the inclusion of other fractions of a whole tone, this music continued to be described under the heading "Vierteltonmusik" until at least the 1990s, for example in the twelfth edition of the Riemann Musiklexikon, and in the second edition of the popular Brockhaus Riemann Musiklexikon.

Ivan Wyschnegradsky used the term ultra-chromatic for intervals smaller than the semitone and infra-chromatic for intervals larger than the semitone; this same term has been used since 1934 by ethnomusicologist Victor Belaiev (Belyaev) in his studies of Azerbaijan and Turkish traditional music. A similar term, subchromatic, has been used by theorist Marek Žabka. Ivor Darreg proposed the term xenharmonic in March 1966; see xenharmonic music. The Austrian composer Franz Richter Herf and the music theorist Rolf Maedel, Herf's colleague at the Salzburg Mozarteum, preferred using the Greek word ekmelic when referring to "all the pitches lying outside the traditional twelve-tone system". Some authors in Russia and some musicology dissertations disseminate the term микрохроматика (microchromatics), coined in the 1970s by Yuri Kholopov, to describe a kind of 'intervallic genus' (интервальный род) for all possible microtonal structures, both ancient (as enharmonic genus—γένος ἐναρμόνιον—of Greeks) and modern (as quarter tone scales of Alois Haba); this generalization term allowed also to avoid derivatives such as микротональность (microtonality, which could be understood in Russian as a sub-tonality, which is subordinate to the dominating tonality, especially in the context of European music of the 19th century) and микротоника (microtonic, "a barely perceptible tonic"; see a clarification in Kholopov [2000]). Other Russian authors use the more international adjective 'microtonal' and have rendered it in Russian as 'микротоновый', but not 'microtonality' ('микротональность'). However, the terms 'микротональность' and 'микротоника' are also used. Some authors writing in French have adopted the term "micro-intervallique" to describe such music. Italian musicologist Luca Conti dedicated two of his monographs to microtonalismo, which is the usual term in Italian, and also in Spanish (e.g., as found in the title of Rué [2000]). The analogous English form, "microtonalism", is also found occasionally instead of "microtonality", e.g., "At the time when serialism and neoclassicism were still incipient a third movement emerged: microtonalism".

The term "macrotonal" has been used for intervals wider than twelve-tone equal temperament, or where there are "fewer than twelve notes per octave", though "this term is not very satisfactory and is used only because there seems to be no other". The term "macrotonal" has also been used for musical form.

Examples of this can be found in various places, ranging from Claude Debussy's impressionistic harmonies to Aaron Copland's chords of stacked fifths, to John Luther Adams' Clouds of Forgetting, Clouds of Unknowing (1995), which gradually expands stacked-interval chords ranging from minor seconds to major sevenths. Louis Andriessen's De Staat (1972–1976) contains a number of "augmented" modes that are based on Greek scales but are asymmetrical to the octave.

== History ==
Greek Dorian mode (enharmonic genus) on E, divided into two tetrachords.

The Hellenic civilizations of ancient Greece left fragmentary records of their music, such as the Delphic Hymns. The ancient Greeks approached the creation of different musical intervals and modes by dividing and combining tetrachords, recognizing three genera of tetrachords: the enharmonic, the chromatic, and the diatonic. Ancient Greek intervals were of many different sizes, including microtones. The enharmonic genus in particular featured intervals of a distinctly "microtonal" nature, which were sometimes smaller than 50 cents, less than half of the contemporary Western semitone of 100 cents. In the ancient Greek enharmonic genus, the tetrachord contained a semitone of varying sizes (approximately 100 cents) divided into two equal intervals called dieses (single "diesis", δίεσις); in conjunction with a larger interval of roughly 400 cents, these intervals comprised the perfect fourth (approximately 498 cents, or the frequency ratio of 4/ 3 in just intonation). Theoretics usually described several diatonic and chromatic genera (some as chroai, "coloration" of one specific intervallic type), but the enarmonic genus was always the only one (argumented as one with the smallest intervals possible).

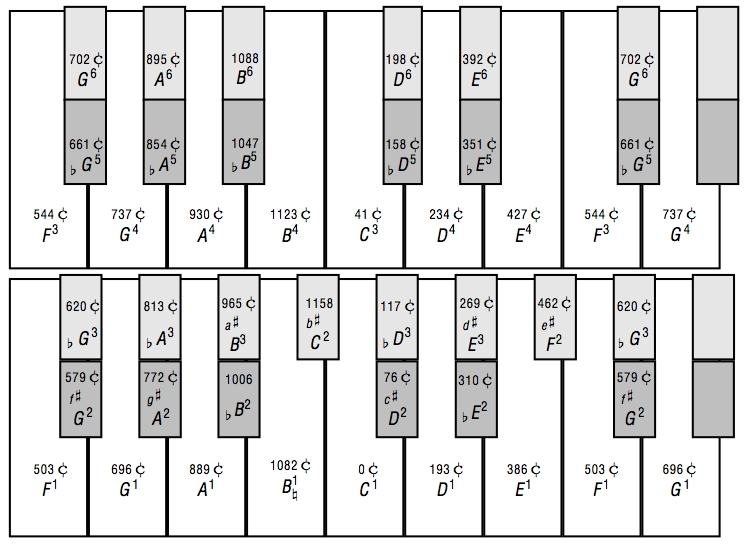
Vicentino's archicembalo in cents

Guillaume Costeley's "Chromatic Chanson", "Seigneur Dieu ta pitié" of 1558 used 1/ 3 comma meantone (which almost exactly equals 19 equal temperament) and explored the full compass of 19 pitches in the octave.

The Italian Renaissance composer and theorist Nicola Vicentino (1511–1576) worked with microtonal intervals and built a keyboard with 36 keys to the octave known as the archicembalo. While theoretically an interpretation of ancient Greek tetrachordal theory, in effect Vicentino presented a circulating system of quarter-comma meantone, maintaining major thirds tuned in just intonation in all keys.

In 1760 the French flautist Charles de Lusse published a treatise, L'Art de la flute traversiere, all surviving copies of which conclude with a composition (possibly added a year or two after the actual publication of the volume) incorporating several quarter tones, titled Air à la grecque, accompanied by explanatory notes tying it to the realization of the Greek enharmonic genus and a chart of quarter tone fingerings for the entire range of the one-keyed flute. Shortly afterward, in a letter published in the Mercure de France in September 1764, the celebrated flautist Pierre-Gabriel Buffardin mentioned this piece and expressed an interest in quarter tones for the flute.

Jacques Fromental Halévy composed a cantata "Prométhée enchaîné" for a solo voice, choir and orchestra (premiered in 1849), where in one movement (Choeur des Océanides) he used quarter tones, to imitate the enharmonic genus of Greeks.

In the 1910s and 1920s, quarter tones received attention from such composers as Charles Ives, Julián Carrillo, Alois Hába, Ivan Wyschnegradsky, and Mildred Couper.

Alexander John Ellis, who in the 1880s produced a translation of Hermann Helmholtz's On the Sensations of Tone, proposed an elaborate set of exotic just intonation tunings and non-harmonic tunings. Ellis also studied the tunings of non-Western cultures and, in a report to the Royal Society, stated that they used neither equal divisions of the octave nor just intonation intervals. Ellis inspired Harry Partch immensely.

During the Exposition Universelle of 1889, Claude Debussy heard a Balinese gamelan performance and was exposed to non-Western tunings and rhythms. Some scholars have ascribed Debussy's subsequent innovative use of the whole-tone (six equal pitches per octave) tuning in such compositions as the Fantaisie for piano and orchestra and the Toccata from the suite Pour le piano to his exposure to the Balinese gamelan at the Paris exposition, and have asserted his rebellion at this time "against the rule of equal temperament" and that the gamelan gave him "the confidence to embark (after the 1900 world exhibition) on his fully characteristic mature piano works, with their many bell- and gong-like sonorities and brilliant exploitation of the piano's natural resonance". Still others have argued that Debussy's works like L'isle joyeuse, La cathédrale engloutie, Prélude à l'après-midi d'un faune, La mer, Pagodes, Danseuses de Delphes, and Cloches à travers les feuilles are marked by a more basic interest in the microtonal intervals found between the higher members of the overtone series, under the influence of Helmholtz's writings. Emil Berliner's introduction of the phonograph in the 1890s allowed much non-Western music to be recorded and heard by Western composers, further spurring the use of non-12 EDO tunings.

Major microtonal composers of the 1920s and 1930s include Alois Hába (quarter tones, or 24 equal pitches per octave, and sixth tones), Julián Carrillo (24 EDO, 36, 48, 60, 72, and 96 equal pitches to the octave embodied in a series of specially custom-built pianos), Ivan Wyschnegradsky (third tones, quarter tones, sixth tones and twelfth tones, non octaving scales) and the early works of Harry Partch (just intonation using frequencies at ratios of prime integers 3, 5, 7, and 11, their powers, and products of those numbers, from a central frequency of G-196).

Prominent microtonal composers or researchers of the 1940s and 1950s include Adriaan Daniel Fokker (31 EDO), Partch (continuing to build his handcrafted orchestra of microtonal just intonation instruments), and Eivind Groven.

Digital synthesizers from the Yamaha TX81Z (1987) on and inexpensive software synthesizers have contributed to the ease and popularity of exploring microtonal music.

== Microtonality in electronic music ==
Electronic music facilitates the use of any kind of microtonal tuning, and sidesteps the need to develop new notational systems. In 1954, Karlheinz Stockhausen built his electronic Studie II on an 81-step scale starting from 100 Hz with the interval of 5^{1/25} between steps, and in Gesang der Jünglinge (1955–56) he used various scales, ranging from seven up to sixty equal divisions of the octave. In 1955, Ernst Krenek used 13 equal-tempered intervals per octave in his Whitsun oratorio, Spiritus intelligentiae, sanctus.

In 1979–80 Easley Blackwood composed a set of Twelve Microtonal Etudes for Electronic Music Media, a cycle that explores all of the equal temperaments from 13 notes to the octave through 24 notes to the octave, including 15-ET and 19-ET. "The project," he wrote, "was to explore the tonal and modal behavior of all [of these] equal tunings..., devise a notation for each tuning, and write a composition in each tuning to illustrate good chord progressions and the practical application of the notation".

In 1986, Wendy Carlos experimented with many microtonal systems including just intonation, using alternate tuning scales she invented for the album Beauty In the Beast. "This whole formal discovery came a few weeks after I had completed the album, Beauty in the Beast, which is wholly in new tunings and timbres".

In 2016, electronic music composed with arbitrary microtonal scales was explored on the album Radionics Radio: An Album of Musical Radionic Thought Frequencies by British composer Daniel Wilson, who derived his compositions' tunings from frequency-runs submitted by users of a custom-built web application replicating radionics-based electronic soundmaking equipment used by Oxford's De La Warr Laboratories in the late 1940s, thereby supposedly embodying thoughts and concepts within the tunings.

Finnish artist Aleksi Perälä works exclusively in a microtonal system known as the Colundi sequence.

=== Limitations of some synthesizers ===
The MIDI 1.0 specification does not directly support microtonal music, because each note-on and note-off message only represents one chromatic tone. However, microtonal scales can be emulated using pitch bending, such as in LilyPond's implementation.

Although some synthesizers allow the creation of customized microtonal scales, this solution does not allow compositions to be transposed. For example, if each B note is raised one quarter tone, then the "raised 7th" would only affect a C major scale.

== Microtonality in rock music ==
Early microtonal guitars focused on issues with the 12-tone equal temperament system. In 1829, Thomas Perronet Thompson designed the Enharmonic Guitar that featured small holes where frets could be inserted. Later developments from Luthier René Lacôte and Paul Kochendorfer include adjustable ebony-mounted frets and levers to simultaneously adjust multiple frets. A form of microtone known as the blue note is an integral part of rock music and one of its predecessors, the blues. The blue notes, located on the third, fifth, and seventh notes of a diatonic major scale, are flattened by a variable microtone. Joe Monzo has made a microtonal analysis of the song "Drunken Hearted Man", written and recorded by the delta blues musician Robert Johnson.

Musicians such as Jon Catler have incorporated microtonal guitars like 31-tone equal tempered guitar and a 62-tone just intonation guitar in blues and jazz rock music.

English rock band Radiohead has used microtonal string arrangements in their music, such as on "How to Disappear Completely" from the album Kid A.

American band Secret Chiefs 3 has been making its own custom "microtonal" instruments since the mid 1990s. The proprietary tuning system they use in their Ishraqiyun aspect is ratio-based, not equal temperament. The band's leader Trey Spruance, also of Mr. Bungle, challenges the terminology of "microtonality" as a development that instead of liberating tonal sensibility to a universe of diverse possibilities, both new and historical, instead mainly serves to reinforce the idea that the universal standard for "tone" is the (western) semitone.

Australian band King Gizzard and the Lizard Wizard utilises microtonal instruments, including custom microtonal guitars modified to play in 24-TET tuning. Tracks with these instruments appear on their albums Flying Microtonal Banana, K.G, and L.W..

American band Horse Lords uses just intonation, playing hand-modified guitars with repositioned frets.

American band Dollshot used quarter tones and other microtonal intervals in their album Lalande.

Canadian experimental duo Angine de Poitrine features a guitarist/bassist playing a microtonal doubleneck instrument.

== In the West ==
=== Western microtonal pioneers ===
- Henry Ward Poole (keyboard designs, 1825–1890)
- Eugène Ysaÿe (Belgium, U.S.A., 1858–1931, used quarter tones in several of the Sonatas for Solo Violin, Op. 27)
- Ferruccio Busoni (Italy, Germany, 1866–1924). Experimented with microtones, including third tones.
- Charles Ives (U.S.A., 1874–1954, quarter tones)
- Julián Carrillo (Mexico, 1875–1965) many different equal temperaments
- Béla Bartók (Hungary, 1881–1945, rare uses of quarter tones)
- George Enescu (Romania, France, 1881–1955) (in Œdipe to suggest the enharmonic genus of ancient Greek music, and in the Third Violin Sonata, as inflections characteristic of Romanian folk music)
- Karol Szymanowski (Poland, 1882–1937, used quarter tones on the violin in Myths Op. 30, 1915)
- Percy Grainger (Australia, 1882–1961, particularly works for his "free music machine")
- Edgard Varèse (France, U.S.A., 1883–1965)
- Mordecai Sandberg (Romania, Austria, Palestine, USA, Canada, 1897–1973)
- Luigi Russolo (Italy, 1885–1947, used quarter tones and eighth tones on the Intonarumori, noise instruments)
- Mildred Couper (U.S.A., 1887–1974, quarter tones)
- Alois Hába (Czechoslovakia, 1893–1973, quarter tones and other equal temperaments)
- Ivan Wyschnegradsky (U.S.S.R. (Russia), France, 1893–1979, quarter tones, twelfth tones and other equal temperaments)
- Harry Partch (U.S.A., 1901–1974, just intonation, including a system of 43 unequal tones to the octave)
- Eivind Groven (Norway, 1901–1977, just intonation 36 tone, adaptive JI)
- Henk Badings (The Netherlands, 1907–1987, 31ET)
- Maurice Ohana (France, 1913–1992, third tones (18ET) and quarter tones (24ET) most particularly)
- Giacinto Scelsi (Italy, 1905–1988, intuitive linear tone deviations, quarter tones, eighth tones)
- Lou Harrison (U.S.A., 1917–2003, just intonation)
- Ivor Darreg (U.S.A., 1917–1994)
- Jean-Etienne Marie (France, 1919–1989, many different equal temperaments: 18ET, 24ET, 30ET, 36ET, 48ET, 96ET most particularly and polymicrotonality)
- Franz Richter Herf (Austria, 1920–1989, 72-equal temperament, "ekmelic" music)
- Iannis Xenakis (Greece, France, 1922–2001, quarter and third tones most particularly, occasionally eighth tones)
- György Ligeti (Hungary, 1923–2006, Ramifications in quarter tone tuning, natural harmonics in his Horn Trio, later just intonation in his solo concertos)
- Luigi Nono (Italy, 1924–1990, quarter tones, eighth tones and 16th tones)
- Claude Ballif (France, 1924–2004, quarter tones)
- Tui St. George Tucker (1924–2004)
- Pierre Boulez (France, 1925–2016) (first example of serial music with quarter tones in his pieces Le Visage nuptial and Polyphonie X, but soon after abandoning microtonal elements)
- Karlheinz Stockhausen (Germany, 1928–2007, used and explored in his electronic works many microtonal concepts, non-octaving scales in Studie II, just intonation in Gruppen and Stimmung, occasional microtonal instrumental and vocal writing throughout Licht)
- Ben Johnston (U.S.A., 1926–2019, extended just intonation)
- Joe Maneri (U.S.A., 1927–2009)
- Ezra Sims (U.S.A., 1928–2015, 72-tone equal temperament)
- Erv Wilson (1928–2016)
- Carlton Gamer (U.S.A, 1929–2023, 7-tone, 19-tone, 22-tone, 31-tone equal temperament)
- Alvin Lucier (U.S.A., 1931–2021)
- Joel Mandelbaum (U.S.A., b. 1932)
- Krzysztof Penderecki (Poland, 1933–2020, quarter tones)
- Easley Blackwood (1933–2023)
- Alain Bancquart (France, b. 1934) (quarter tones and 16th tones)
- James Tenney (U.S.A., 1934–2006, just intonation, 72-tone equal temperament)
- Terry Riley (U.S.A., b. 1935, just intonation)
- La Monte Young (U.S.A., b. 1935, just intonation)
- John Corigliano (U.S.A., b. 1938, quarter tones)
- Douglas Leedy (b. 1938, just intonation, meantone)
- Wendy Carlos (U.S.A., b. 1939, non-octaving scales)
- Bruce Mather (Canada, b. 1939, different equal temperaments, following Wyschnegradsky)
- Brian Ferneyhough (Great Britain, b. 1943, quarter tones, 31ET in Unity Capsule for solo flute, 1976; quarter tones and eighth tones in La Chute d'Icare, 1988)
- Jukka Tiensuu (Finland, b. 1948, quarter tones, non equal temperament tunings)

=== Later Western microtonal composers ===
- Hans-Joachim Koellreutter (Brazil, 1915–2005)
- Clarence Barlow (1945–2023)
- Gérard Grisey (1946–1998) (spectral approach to microintervals, quarter tones, eighth tones)
- Max Méreaux (b. 1946)
- Michael Tilson Thomas (b. 1944)
- Tristan Murail (b. 1947) (spectral approach to microintervals, quarter tones, eighth tones)
- Glenn Branca (b. 1948)
- Elizabeth Brown (b. 1953)
- Claude Vivier (1948–1983)
- Dean Drummond (1949–2013)
- Greg Schiemer (b. 1949)
- Lasse Thoresen (b. 1949)
- Warren Burt (b. 1949)
- Manfred Stahnke (b. 1951)
- James Erber (b. 1951) (quarter tones)
- Rhys Chatham (b. 1952)
- Kraig Grady (b. 1952) (invented acoustic instruments in just intonation & recurrent sequences)
- David First (b. 1953)
- Georg Friedrich Haas (b. 1953)
- James Wood (b. 1953)
- Pascale Criton (b. 1954) (different equal temperaments, most particularly very dense ETs such as the 96ET)
- Paul Dirmeikis (b. 1954)
- Stephen James Taylor (b. 1954)
- Pascal Dusapin (b. 1955) (different equal temperaments, notably the 48ET)
- Kyle Gann (b. 1955)
- Johnny Reinhard (b. 1956) (different equal temperaments, just intonation, polymicrotonally)
- Dave Soldier (b. 1956)
- Eric Mandat (b. 1957)
- Erling Wold (b. 1958)
- Michael Bach Bachtischa (b. 1958)
- Lucio Garau (b. 1959)
- Michael Harrison (b. 1959) (just intonation)
- Martin Smolka (b. 1959)
- Richard Barrett (b. 1959)
- Georg Hajdu (b. 1960)
- William Susman (b. 1960)
- François Paris (b. 1961)
- Franklin Cox (b. 1961) (quarter tones, twelfth tones, extended just intonation)
- Daniel James Wolf (b. 1961)
- Claus-Steffen Mahnkopf (b. 1962) (quarter tones, eight tones)
- Harold Fortuin (b. 1964)
- Marc Sabat (b. 1965) (extended JI up to 23-limit)
- Georges Lentz (b. 1965)
- Jeffrey Ching (b. 1965) (quarter tones, ancient Chinese tunings, e.g. circle-of-fifths and just intonation)
- Geoff Smith (b. 1966)
- Peter Thoegersen (b. 1967) (Polymicrotonality)
- Trey Spruance (b. 1969)
- Elaine Walker (b. 1969)
- Enno Poppe (b. 1969)
- Richard David James, aka Aphex Twin (b. 1971)
- Paweł Mykietyn (b. 1971)
- Yitzhak Yedid (b. 1971)
- Fabio Costa (composer, conductor) (b. 1971)
- Yuri Landman (b. 1973)
- Kristoffer Zegers (b. 1973)
- Karola Obermueller (b. 1977)
- Dongryul Lee (b. 1978)
- Martin Suckling (b. 1981)
- Saman Samadi (b. 1984)
- Taylor Brook (b. 1985)
- Michael Waller (b. 1985)
- Mick Gordon (b. 1985)
- Sean Archibald, aka Sevish, (b. 1988)
- Seppe Gebruers (b. 1990)
- Robin Haigh (b. 1993)
- Jacob Collier (b. 1994)

=== Western microtonal researchers ===
- Mordecai Sandberg (1897–1973)
- Christiaan Huygens (1629–1695)
- Julián Carrillo (1875–1965)
- Adriaan Daniël Fokker (1887–1972)
- Ivan Wyschnegradsky (1893–1979)
- Joseph Yasser (1893–1981)
- Alois Hába (1893–1973)
- Harry Partch (1901–1974)
- Alain Daniélou (1907–1994)
- Jean-Etienne Marie (1917–1989)
- Erv Wilson (1928–2016)
- Carlton Gamer (1929-2023)
- Joel Mandelbaum (b. 1932)
- James Tenney (1934–2006)
- Seppe Gebruers (b. 1990)
- Tom Zé (b. 1936)
- Clarence Barlow (1945–2023)
- Valeri Brainin (b. 1948)
- Jacques Dudon (b. 1951)
- William Sethares (b. 1955)
- Georg Hajdu (b. 1960)
- Bob Gilmore (1961–2015)
- Marc Sabat (b. 1965)
- Mathius Shadow-Sky (b. 1961)

== See also ==
- 3rd bridge – Guitar where the bridge extends beyond its usual stop
- Arab tone system – Musical tuning system of 24 tones per octave and maqam
- Bohlen–Pierce scale – Musical scale
- Continuum Fingerboard – Music performance controller and synthesizer
- Fokker periodicity blocks – Concept in musical tuning theory
- Genus (music) – Classification in ancient Greek music theory
- Harmony – Aspect of music
- Huygens-Fokker Foundation
- Just intonation – Musical tuning based on pure intervals
- Limit (music) – Numerical limit on the factors used in a musical tuning system
- Microtuner – Device to test musical instrument tuning
- MIDI tuning standard – Specification of precise musical pitch
- Music of India
- Musical scale – Ascending or descending sequence of musical tones
- Musical tuning – Terms for tuning an instrument and a systems of pitches
- Negative space – Space around an object
- Partch's 43-tone scale – Musical scale created by Harry Partch
- Quarter tone – Musical interval
- Raga – Melodic mode of improvisation in Indian music
- Scala
- Sonido 13 – Theory of microtonal music
