= List of things named after Christiaan Huygens =

This is a List of things named after Christiaan Huygens, the famous astronomer.

== Astronomy ==
- Cassini–Huygens, mission to Saturn and Titan
  - Huygens (spacecraft), the probe of the Cassini-Huygens mission which landed on Saturn's moon Titan in 2005
- 2801 Huygens, an asteroid
- Huygens (crater), martian crater
- Mons Huygens, a mountain of Earth's Moon
- Huygens Gap, in the rings of Saturn

== Physics ==
- Huygens law; see one of:
  - Huygens's law (pendulums)
  - Huygens's law
- Huygens–Steiner theorem

=== Optics ===
- Huygens–Fresnel principle
- Huygens's principle, see Huygens–Fresnel principle
- Huygens eyepiece, first compound eye piece

== Mathematics and games ==
- Huygens lemniscate, a figure eight curve
- König–Huygens formula, see Steiner–Huygens

== Other ==
- Huygens–Fokker Foundation
- Huygens's tritone, a musical interval
- Huygens's engine
- Huygens Lyceum, High School in Eindhoven, Netherlands.
- Huygens College, High School in Heerhugowaard, Netherlands.
- The Christiaan Huygens, a ship of the Nederland Line.
- Huygens Scholarship Programme for international students and Dutch students
- W.I.S.V. Christiaan Huygens: Dutch study guild for the studies Mathematics and Computer Science at the Delft University of Technology
- Huygens Laboratory: Home of the Physics department at Leiden University
- Huygens Supercomputer: at SARA, Amsterdam
- The Huygens-building in Noordwijk, Netherlands
- The Huygens-building at the Radboud University, Nijmegen, The Netherlands.
