= Peabody Institute Library (Peabody, Massachusetts) =

- U.S. National Register of Historic Places
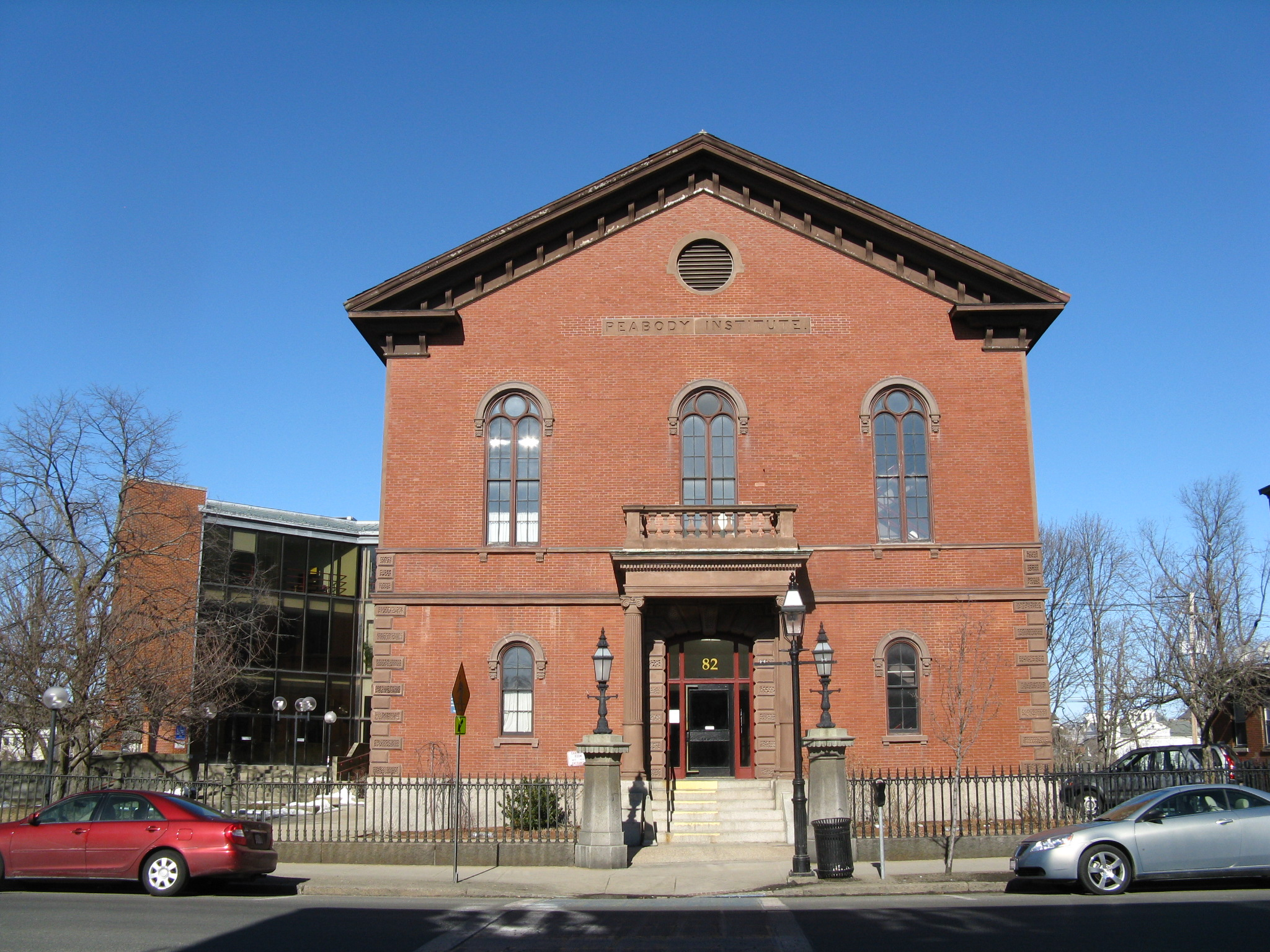
- Peabody Institute Library

- Location within Massachusetts Location within the United States
- Location: 82 Main St., Peabody, Massachusetts
- Coordinates: 42°31′29″N 70°55′28″W
- Area: less than one acre
- Built: 1853
- Architectural style: Italianate
- NRHP reference No.: 73000311
- Added to NRHP: June 4, 1973

The Peabody Institute Library is the public library serving Peabody, Massachusetts. It was established in 1852 by a bequest from philanthropist and Peabody native George Peabody, and now has its main facility at 82 Main Street, with the South Branch at 78 Lynn Street and West Branch at 603 Lowell Street. The main library is housed in a two-story brick building built in 1853 which is now listed on the National Register of Historic Places. The library is claimed to be the oldest public library in the United States to operate continuously from the same location.

== Main Library ==
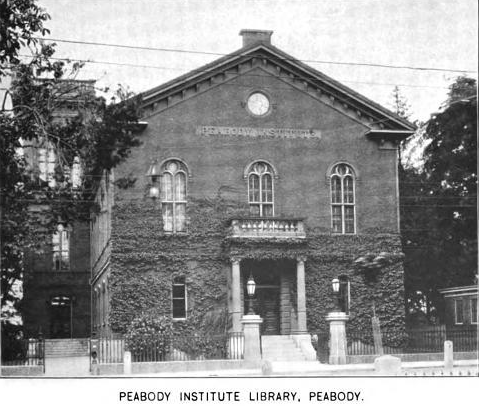
1899 view of the library

In 1852 the Town of Danvers was celebrating its centennial and separation from the City of Salem. In the spring of 1852, the Danvers Centennial Committee wrote to George Peabody, who was living in London at the time, an invitation to come back to and celebrate with the Danvers residents. George Peabody's response that was sent on May 26, 1852, stated that he would be unable to attend the events.

Yet he made a donation of $20,000 for the creation of a library in Danvers. George Peabody made two stipulations, one that it be free to everyone and the second was that it have a lyceum.

At a Danvers Selectmen meeting that was held in June 1852 the town voted that the library be named the Peabody Institute after George Peabody. In order to ensure the future generations to know about George Peabody's donation the town voted to have the library's name inscribed on the front of the building to remind everyone of the library's benefactor.

The cornerstone was placed on August 20, 1853 by the Honorable Abbott Lawrence, who was a friend of George Peabody and served as the ambassador to England.

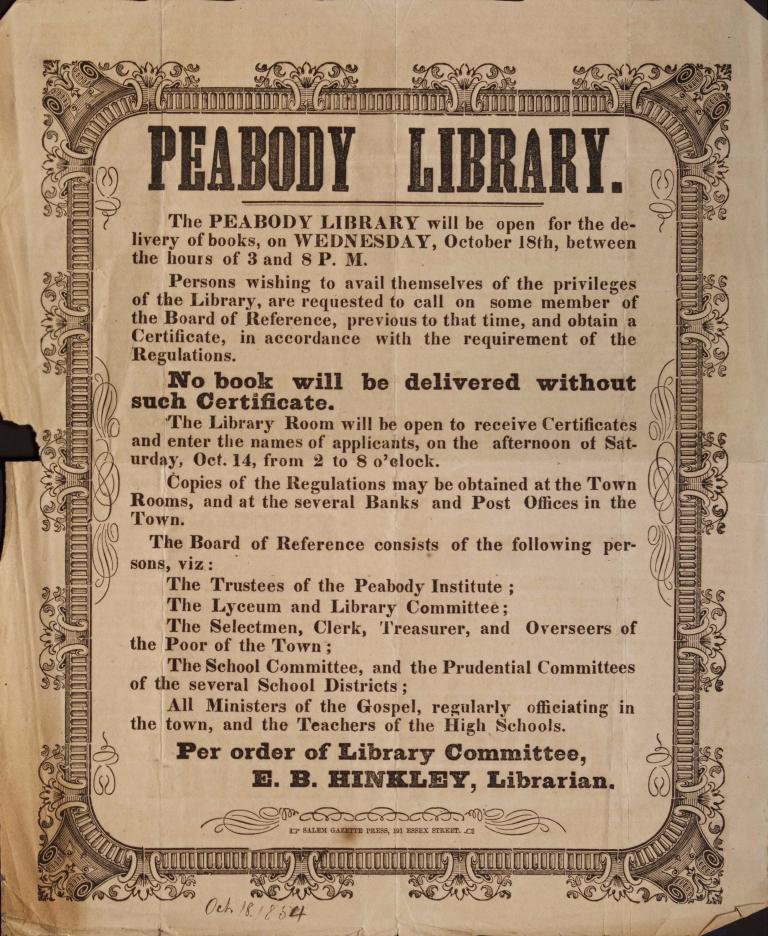
Broadside for the opening of the Peabody Institute Library

The main Peabody Institute Library is located in Peabody's downtown, on the north side of Main Street. It is a two-story masonry structure, built out of red brick and brownstone trim and set on a high granite foundation. The architect was Richard Bond who was a well known New England architect, and Franklin Merrill, who was from Danvers, and Russell & White of Salem were the contractors for the library. It is covered by a gabled roof, with extended eaves studded with Italianate brackets, and a round louvered opening at the center of the gable. The ground floor level has brownstone quoining, rising to a shallow cornice that extends across the facade even with the portico sheltering the main entrance. The entrance portico has Ionic columns supporting an entablature and balustrade. Flanking it are round-arch windows with bracketed brownstone sills and lintels. The second level has three taller windows with similar surrounds, with interior round-arch windows topped by circular pane. The Library was dedicated on September 29, 1854, and Rufus Choate was one of the speakers. The Library officially opened on October 18, 1854.

The building's construction was funded by a gift of $200,000 from George Peabody, and it was formally dedicated in 1854. The first librarian was Fitch Poole, a noted writer and humorist of the period. Although Fitch Poole was the first librarian he resigned just before the library's opening. Eugene B. Hinckley served last as the librarian when the library officially opened. Hinckley served as the librarian until May 1856 and Fitch Poole served as the librarian. Fitch Poole worked as the librarian until his death in 1873.

=== Eben Dale Sutton Reference Room ===
In 1866 George Peabody was visiting South Danvers and met with Eliza Sutton. At that meeting Eliza discussed making a donation of $20,000 to the library to build a reference room that would be named after her late son, Eben Dale Sutton, who had died in 1862 at the age of 14. George Peabody approved of the idea. Eliza Sutton sent a letter dated April 7, 1869 to the Peabody Institute Trustees stating her intention to donate $20,000 to build a reference room and a tower, and was to be named the Eben Dale Sutton Reference Room. In addition, the room was to hold "books of enduring value." The tower and reference room was completed in 1869. The architect was Gridley James Fox Bryant. The room was built by Messrs, Clark and Giddings, who were both from Peabody. The wood is black walnut and the room was made to look like the reading room at Oxford University. The red velvet and wood chairs and tables were purchased from H.A. Turner & Co. of Boston. The room officially opened on June 14, 1869.

Books were chosen with the assistance of Ezra Abbott the assistant librarian of Harvard University and had agreed to help the Trustees select the appropriate books. Both George Peabody and Eliza Sutton both donated books to the new reference room. Eliza Sutton donated the three volume set of John James Audubon's book Birds of America. Eliza also donated a bust of her husband Eben Sutton that was sculpted by Thomas Ball and given before her death in 1888; the bust sits in a corner of the Sutton Room. Shortly after the room opened two brass statuettes were used as gas burners, which were to represent Boston and New York.

The room itself has been renovated and changed over the years. The walls and woodwork and shelves were cleaned in 1911, and later on that same year the floor refinished. The floors and cleaning was done again in 1933, and the ceiling was replastered in 1953. The room was restored in 1976 from a bicentennial grant, and in 2003 the ceiling was restored to its original state.

Reference librarians were hired to oversee the room. Between 1869 and 1973 there were six librarians that oversaw the room. They were:

- Mary J. Floyd, Librarian from 1869 to June 1881. (12–13 years)
- Sarah E. Perkins, Librarian from March to October 1882.
- Augusta F. Daniels, October 1882 to Jan. 25, 1908. (26 years)
- Frances M. Carroll from Jan. 1908 to March 3, 1945. (37 years)
- Louise H. Teague, from March 1945 to 1958. (13 years)
- Dorothy Cooper, Librarian from 1958 to June 1973. (15 years)

When Dorothy Cooper retired in 1973 the Sutton Room was closed to the public, and would remain so until 2002 when Martha Holden, the director at the time, hired Nancy C. Barthelemy as the first archivist. Nancy Barthelemy served as the archivist until 2012. Erik Bauer would serve as the second archivist from January 2013 until September 2020.

=== George Peabody Lying in Repose ===
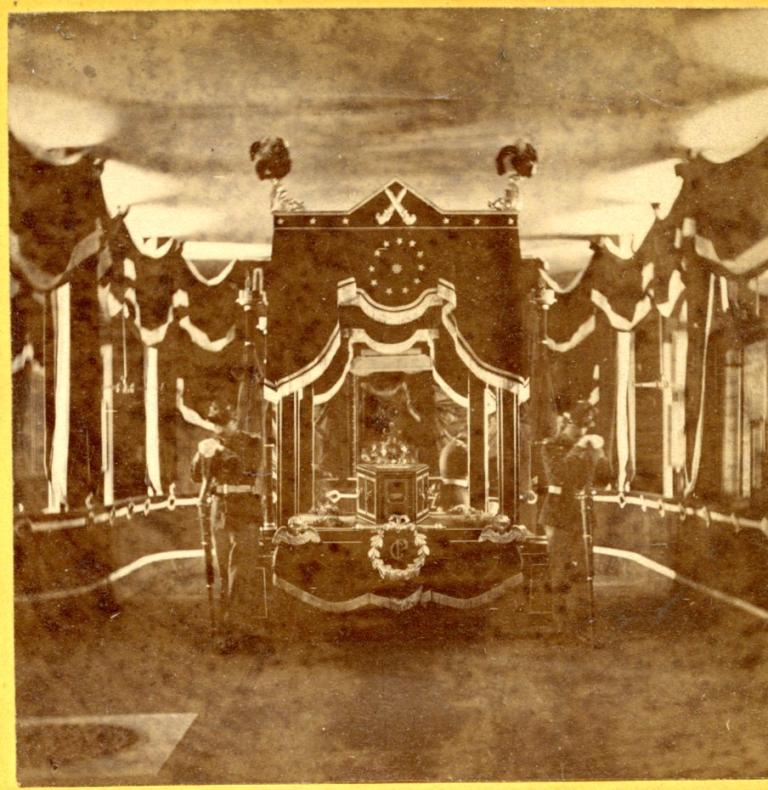
George Peabody Lying in Repose at the Peabody Institute Library

On November 4, 1869 George Peabody died in London. He was briefly buried at Westminster Abbey until his will was found. His will stipulated that he be buried at Harmony Grove Cemetery in Salem. His body was transported on the H.M.S. Monarch in December 1869 to Portland, Maine because the harbor there was deeper. On February 1, 1870 he was transported by train on the Eastern Railroad to Peabody.

George Peabody's body would lie in repose at the Peabody Institute for a week. The front portico of the library's entrance was draped in black with the American and the flag of Great Britain. Four federal soldiers stood guard at all hours and they set up camp in the Sutton Room. Thousand people paid their respects to George Peabody. On February 8, 1870 his body was taken from the library to be buried at Harmony Grove Cemetery in Salem.

== Branch Libraries ==
=== South Branch Library ===
The Peabody Institute opened the South Branch Library on November 27, 1967, and is located at 78 Lynn Street. The City of Peabody purchased the building, which was originally an insurance company, for $62,000. The South Branch would share building space with two other city departments the Office of Veteran Affairs until 1975 when those city departments moved to the Wallis School. The dedication of the South Branch would be attended by Mayor Edward Meaney and Nicholas Mavroules mayor-elect. The library opened with 4,000 books.

With the passage of Proposition. 2 1/2 in 1980 led to the South Branch hours being reduced. Over the next decade, the original building was becoming outdated, and the need for a new building to better serve the community was planned. A ground breaking ceremony was held in November 1999 and a new building was constructed. In March 2001 a $300,000 renovation was completed. The renovation allowed the South Branch to have a new community room, expanded children's area, and new interiors. The current South Branch Library currently has over 25,000 volumes that can be checked out by the public.

=== West Branch Library ===
As West Peabody was become more populated there was a need for the library to reach these residents. The original building was located within the Peabody Fire Department. Next door to the fire station was a small building that belonged to the West Peabody Community Club. The City of Peabody would purchase the building that was built in 1961 at 603 Lowell Street.

The original building was small would need to be torn down in order to construct a new building. In 1989 the City of Peabody would begin to construct a new West Branch Library. The new West Branch would be able to have more books and include a large programming/community space and have room for patrons to sit and browse. The dedication of the West Branch took place on March 11, 1990 speakers include Mayor Peter Torigian; Peabody Institute library director Dr. Mary Ann Tricarico; and trustee Albert Cohen among others.

== See also ==
- Peabody Essex Museum
- George Peabody
- National Register of Historic Places listings in Essex County, Massachusetts
