= Combination product =

Combination product may refer to:

- Combination drug, two or more drugs formulated together
- combination product (medical), The US FDA term for a medical device and the drug or biologic it is intended to deliver
- Combination Product Sets of music theory
