= Fokker periodicity block =

Concept in musical tuning theory

Fokker periodicity block for 12-step equal tuning, showing just intonation values on the left and the corresponding equal tuning values on the right

Fokker periodicity blocks are a concept in tuning theory used to mathematically relate musical intervals in just intonation to those in equal tuning. They are named after Adriaan Daniël Fokker. These are included as the primary subset of what Erv Wilson refers to as constant structures, where "each interval occurs always subtended by the same number of steps".

The basic idea of Fokker's periodicity blocks is to represent just ratios as points on a lattice, and to find vectors in the lattice which represent very small intervals, known as commas. Treating pitches separated by a comma as equivalent "folds" the lattice, effectively reducing its dimension by one; mathematically, this corresponds to finding the quotient group of the original lattice by the sublattice generated by the commas. For an n-dimensional lattice, identifying n linearly independent commas reduces the dimension of the lattice to zero, meaning that the number of pitches in the lattice is finite; mathematically, its quotient is a finite abelian group. This zero-dimensional set of pitches is a periodicity block. Frequently, it forms a cyclic group, in which case identifying the m pitches of the periodicity block with m-equal tuning gives equal tuning approximations of the just ratios that defined the original lattice.

Note that octaves are usually ignored in constructing periodicity blocks (as they are in scale theory generally) because it is assumed that for any pitch in the tuning system, all pitches differing from it by some number of octaves are also available in principle. In other words, all pitches and intervals can be considered as residues modulo octave. This simplification is commonly known as octave equivalence.

== Definition of periodicity blocks ==
Let an n-dimensional lattice (i.e. integer grid) embedded in n-dimensional space have a numerical value assigned to each of its nodes, such that moving within the lattice in one of the cardinal directions corresponds to a shift in pitch by a particular interval. Typically, n ranges from one to three. Simultaneously the two-dimensional case, the lattice is a square lattice. In the 3-D case, the lattice is cubic.

Examples of such lattices are the following (x, y, z and w are integers):

- In the one-dimensional case, the interval corresponding to a single step is generally taken to be a perfect fifth, with ratio 3/2, defining 3-limit just tuning. The lattice points correspond to the integers, with the point at position x being labeled with the pitch value 3^{x}/2^{y} for a number y chosen to make the resulting value lie in the range from 1 to 2. Thus, A(0) = 1, and surrounding it are the values

... 128/81, 32/27, 16/9, 4/3, 1, 3/2, 9/8, 27/16, 81/64, ...

- In the two-dimensional case, corresponding to 5-limit just tuning, the intervals defining the lattice are a perfect fifth and a major third, with ratio 5/4. This gives a square lattice in which the point at position (x,y) is labeled with the value 3^{x}5^{y}2^{z}. Again, z is chosen to be the unique integer that makes the resulting value lie in the interval [1,2).
- The three-dimensional case is similar, but adds the harmonic seventh to the set of defining intervals, leading to a cubic lattice in which the point at position (x,y,z) is labeled with a value 3^{x}5^{y}7^{z}2^{w} with w chosen to make this value lie in the interval [1,2).

Once the lattice and its labeling is fixed, one chooses n nodes of the lattice other than the origin whose values are close to either 1 or 2. The vectors from the origin to each one of these special nodes are called unison vectors. These vectors define a sublattice of the original lattice, which has a fundamental domain that in the two-dimensional case is a parallelogram bounded by unison vectors and their shifted copies, and in the three-dimensional case is a parallelepiped. These domains form the tiles in a tessellation of the original lattice.

The tile has an area or volume given by the absolute value of the determinant of the matrix of unison vectors: i.e. in the 2-D case if the unison vectors are u and v, such that $\mathbf{u} = (u_x, u_y)$ and $\mathbf{v} = (v_x, v_y)$ then the area of a 2-D tile is

$$\left| \begin{matrix} u_x & u_y \\ v_x & v_y \end{matrix} \right| = u_x v_y - u_y v_x.$$

Each tile is called a Fokker periodicity block. The area of each block is always a natural number equal to the number of nodes falling within each block.

== Examples ==
Fokker periodicity blocks for six equal temperaments, showing their defining commas

Example 1: Take the 2-dimensional lattice of perfect fifths (ratio 3/2) and just major thirds (ratio 5/4). Choose the commas 128/125 (the diesis, the distance by which three just major thirds fall short of an octave, about 41 cents) and 81/80 (the syntonic comma, the difference between four perfect fifths and a just major third, about 21.5 cents). The result is a block of twelve, showing how twelve-tone equal temperament approximates the ratios of the 5-limit.

Example 2: However, if we were to reject the diesis as a unison vector and instead choose the difference between five major thirds (minus an octave) and a fourth, 3125/3072 (about 30 cents), the result is a block of 19, showing how 19-TET approximates ratios of the 5-limit.

Example 3: In the 3-dimensional lattice of perfect fifths, just major thirds and just harmonic sevenths, the identification of the syntonic comma, the septimal kleisma (225/224, about 8 cents) and the ratio 1029/1024 (the difference between three septimal whole tones and a perfect fifth, about 8.4 cents) results in a block of 31, showing how 31-TET approximates ratios of the 7-limit.

== Mathematical characteristics of periodicity blocks ==
The periodicity blocks form a secondary, oblique lattice, superimposed on the first one. This lattice may be given by a function φ:

$$\phi_B(x, y) := (x_0, y_0) + (x, y) \begin{pmatrix} u_x & u_y \\ v_x & v_y \end{pmatrix}$$

which is really a linear combination:

$$\phi_B(x, y) := (x_0, y_0) + x\mathbf{u} + y\mathbf{v}$$

where point (x_{0}, y_{0}) can be any point, preferably not a node of the primary lattice, and preferably so that points φ(0,1), φ(1,0) and φ(1,1) are not any nodes either.

Then membership of primary nodes within periodicity blocks may be tested analytically through the inverse φ function:

$$\phi_B^{-1}(x, y) := \left( (x,y) - (x_0,y_0)\right) \begin{pmatrix} u_x & u_y \\ v_x & v_y \end{pmatrix}^{-1}$$

$$= { \left( (x,y) - (x_0,y_0) \right) \over u_x v_y - u_y v_x} \begin{pmatrix} v_y & -u_y \\ -v_x & u_x \end{pmatrix}$$

Let

$$\nu_B (x,y) := ( \lfloor x\rfloor, \lfloor y\rfloor ),$$

$$\mu_B (x,y) := \nu_B (\phi_B^{-1}(x,y)),$$

then let the pitch B(x,y) belong to the scale M_{B} iff $\mu_B(x,y) = \mu_B(0,0),$ i.e.

$$M_B = \{ B(x,y) : \mu_B(x,y) = \mu_B(0,0) \}.$$

For the one-dimensional case:

$$\phi_A (x) := x_0 + L x$$

where L is the length of the unison vector,

$$\phi_A^{-1}(x) = {x - x_0 \over L}$$

$$\mu_A (x) := \left\lfloor {x - x_0 \over L} \right\rfloor,$$

$$M_A = \{A(x) : \mu_A (x) = \mu_A (0)\}.$$

For the three-dimensional case,

$$\phi_C (x,y,z) := (x_0, y_0, z_0) + (x, y, z) \begin{pmatrix} u_x & u_y & u_z \\ v_x & v_y & v_z \\ w_x & w_y & w_z \end{pmatrix}$$

$$\phi_C^{-1}(x,y,z) = {((x,y,z) - (x_0,y_0,z_0)) \over \Delta} \begin{pmatrix} v_y w_z - v_z w_y & u_z w_y - u_y w_z & u_y v_z - u_z v_y \\ v_z w_x - v_x w_z & u_x w_z - u_z w_x & u_z v_x - u_x v_z \\ v_x w_y - v_y w_x & u_y w_x - u_x w_y & u_x v_y - u_y v_x \end{pmatrix}$$

where $\Delta = u_x v_y w_z + u_y v_z w_x + u_z v_x w_y - u_x v_z w_y - u_y v_x w_z - u_z v_y w_x$ is the determinant of the matrix of unison vectors.

$$\nu_C (x,y,z) := (\lfloor x\rfloor, \lfloor y\rfloor, \lfloor z\rfloor)$$

$$\mu_C (x,y,z) := \nu_C (\phi_C^{-1}(x,y,z))$$

$$M_C = \{ C(x,y,z) : \mu_C (x,y,z) = \mu_C (0,0,0) \}.$$
