= Kraig Grady =

American composer

Kraig Grady

Kraig Grady (born 1952) is a US-Australian composer/sound artist. He has composed and performed with an ensemble of microtonal instruments of his own design and also worked as a shadow puppeteer, tuning theorist, filmmaker, world music radio DJ and concert promoter. His works feature his own ensembles of acoustic instruments, including metallophones, marimbas, hammered dulcimers and reed organs tuned to microtonal just intonation scales. His compositions include accompaniments for silent films and shadow plays. An important influence in the development of Grady's music was Harry Partch, like Grady, a musician from the Southwest, and a composer of theatrical works in Just Intonation for self-built instruments. Many of his compositions use unusual meters of very extended lengths.

== Biography ==
Born in Montebello, California in 1952, Grady began composing while still in his teens. After studies with Nicolas Slonimsky, Dean Drummond, Dorrance Stalvey and Byong-Kon Kim, he produced his earliest compositions. Since meeting tuning theorist Erv Wilson in 1975, he has composed and performed in alternative tunings based on Wilson's theories, first in 31-tone equal temperament, and eventually in the just intonation resources of Wilson's combination-product sets and meta-slendro. In the early 1980s Grady and filmmaker Keith Barefoot created a number of performances combining live music with silent film. In his 1989 opera War and Pieces, he used film to project stage settings as well as illustrate the inner thoughts of the live performers.

Since 1993 Grady's work has been connected to the activities of "The North American Embassy of Anaphoria Island", a 501(c)(3) non-profit organization promoting the culture of this envisioned island, which Grady characterizes as a "visionary geography". He has produced numerous solo and ensemble works and thirteen shadow plays representing the "traditional" repertoire of Anaphoria: Ten Black Eye I-II, Black Eye Meru, Her Stirring Stone, Their Ventures Beyond The Horizons, The Stolen Stars, Frenzy At The Royal Threshold, The Quiet Erow, The Pilgrimage of Mirrors, The Follies of Dr. Placebo, The Quiet Erow II, The Brook of No Return," and "Nature on the Loose

Despite the fact that the size of his instruments make touring difficult, his work has been presented at Ballhaus Naunyn Berlin (Germany), the Chateau de la Napoule (France), the Norton Simon Museum of Art, the UCLA Armand Hammer Museum, the Pacific Asia Museum, California Institute of the Arts, Pomona College, Pierce College, Villa Aurora Foundation for European American Relations, the Schindler House, Beyond Baroque, the Brand Library, New Langton Arts, as well as numerous live performances on radio KPFK, KCRW, and KXLU. His work was also presented as part of the Los Angeles Philharmonic’s American Music Weekend as well as New Music America 1985. He has been nominated four times for the LA Weekly Music Awards best uncategorizable artist and was chosen by Buzz Magazine as one of the "100 coolest people in Los Angeles".

The Quiet Erow made its Australian premiere on 9 October 2009 at the Helensburgh Bushland Chapel, starring Kraig Grady (director), his wife Terumi Narushima, Seth Harris, Mark Kennedy, Friederike Krishnabhakdi-Vasilakis and Hamish Lane.

Grady's shadow play The Brook of No Return made its debut in November 2018, in Wollongong and Sydney. It returned to Wollongong in September 2019. " Nature on the Loose" was presented at the Wollongong art Gallery in August 2022. The cast consisted of Grady (also as director), Jess Boyle, Hayley Carrick, Terumi Narushima, Joshua Mills, Jariss Shead, and Jiahong Zhao.

Grady is also the acting editor of Xenharmonikon, an online journal on Microtonal music

== Selective discography ==
- Music From The Island Of Anaphoria (BZang Editions, Tiny Organ) 1994 CD
- From The Interiors Of Anaphoria (BZang Editions) 1995 CD
- The Creation Of The Worlds (BZang Editions) 1997 CD
- The Stolen Stars: An Anaphoria Dance Drama (Archive Of Anaphoria) 2003 CD
- Without R & R. (Experimental Musical Research) 2005 3" CD-R
- Orenda (Archive Of Anaphoria) 2006 3" CD-R
- Beyond The Windows Perhaps Among The Podcorn (Transparency) 2007 CD
- Footpaths and Trade Routes (ini.itu) 2009 LP, limited edition of 250
- Our Rainy Season/Nuilagi (And/oar) 2011, Limited edition of 300
- Escarpments (ini.itu) 2014 LP, limited edition of 250
- In a Pentagonal Room (Archive Of Anaphoria) 2014 CD
- Monuments of Diamonds (Another Timbre) 2020 CD
- Crow on The Dark Side of Gloss (Mode Records) 2026 CD

== See also ==
- Hexany His "A Farewell Ring" is for the Hexany and he has many other works for Combination-product sets
