= Bimhuis =

Concert hall in Amsterdam

Coordinates: 52.378°N 4.913°E

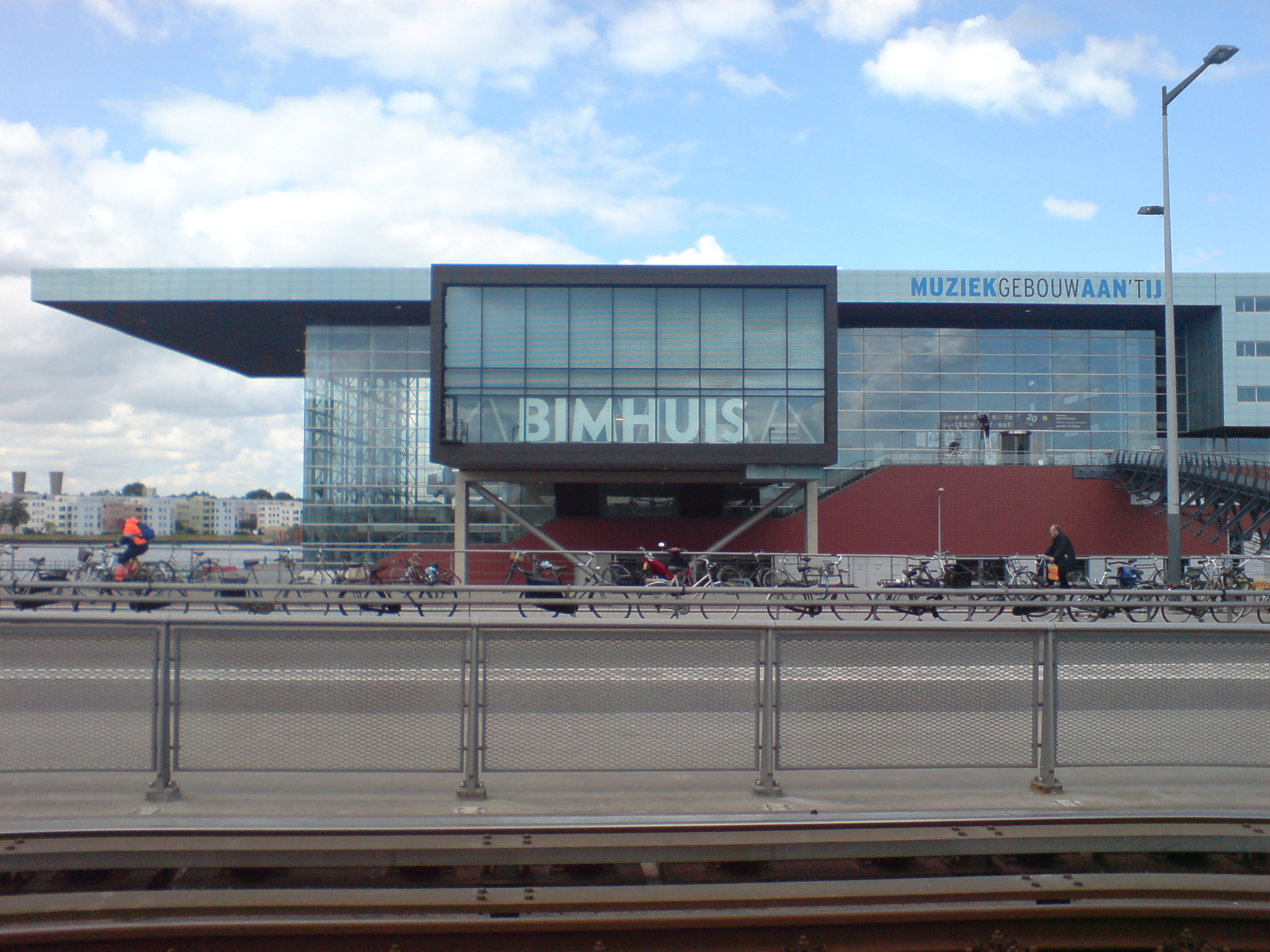
Bimhuis and Muziekgebouw aan 't IJ by day

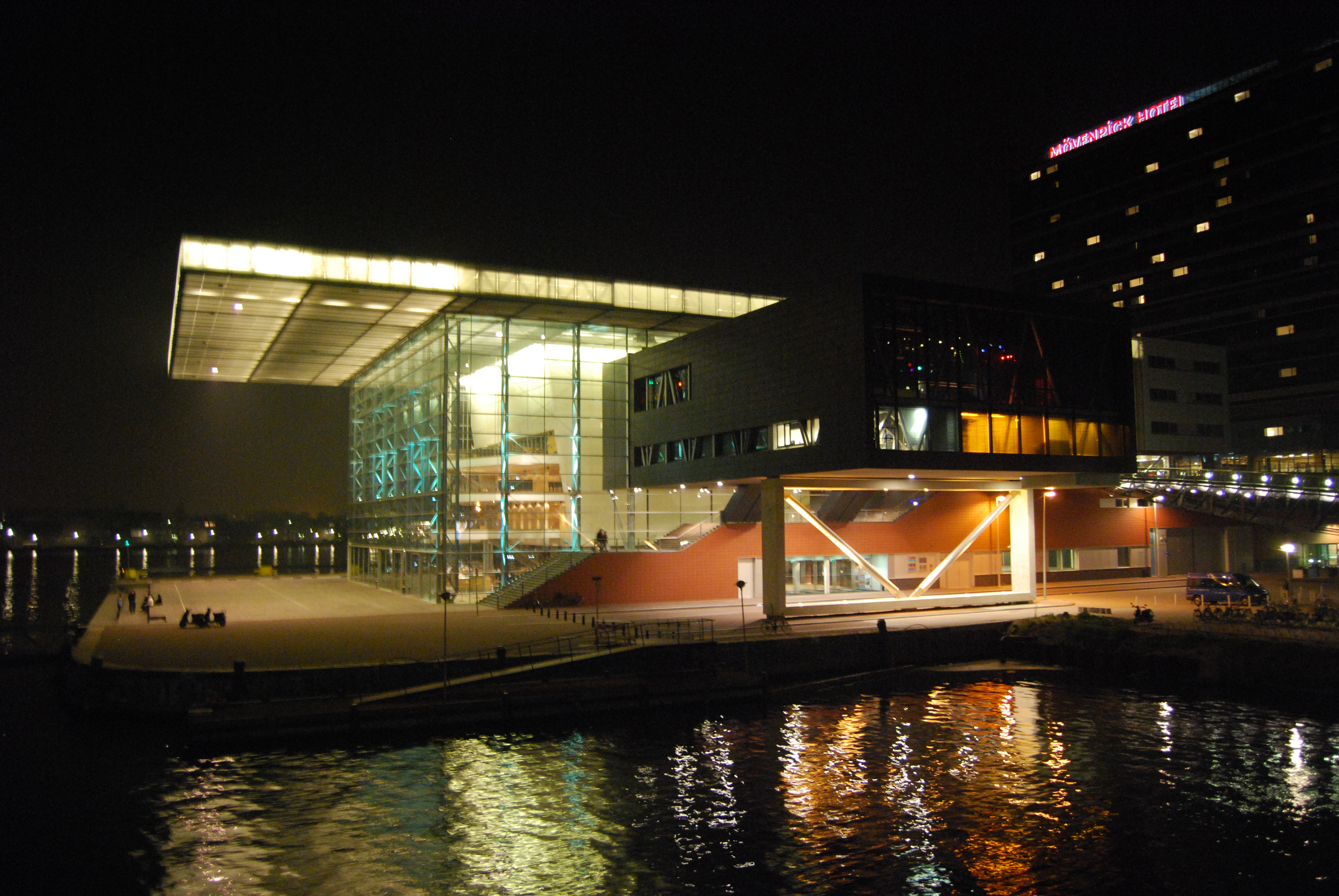
Muziekgebouw aan 't IJ and the Bimhuis

The Bimhuis is a concert hall for jazz and improvised music in Amsterdam.

With an average of 150 performances a year the Bimhuis is the main stage for these musical genres in the Netherlands. In 2017 it was also a host for the 17th edition of the Sonic Acts Festival.

The Bimhuis was founded in 1973 and opened on October 1, 1974. Until the summer of 2004 it was located at Oude Schans 73–77 in the centre of the city. Since January 2005 it is housed in a new building at the Piet Heinkade 3, next to the Muziekgebouw aan 't IJ, on the southern bank of the IJ river.
