= Muziekgebouw aan 't IJ =

Concert hall in Amsterdam, Netherlands

Coordinates: 52°22′41.30″N 4°54′46.80″E

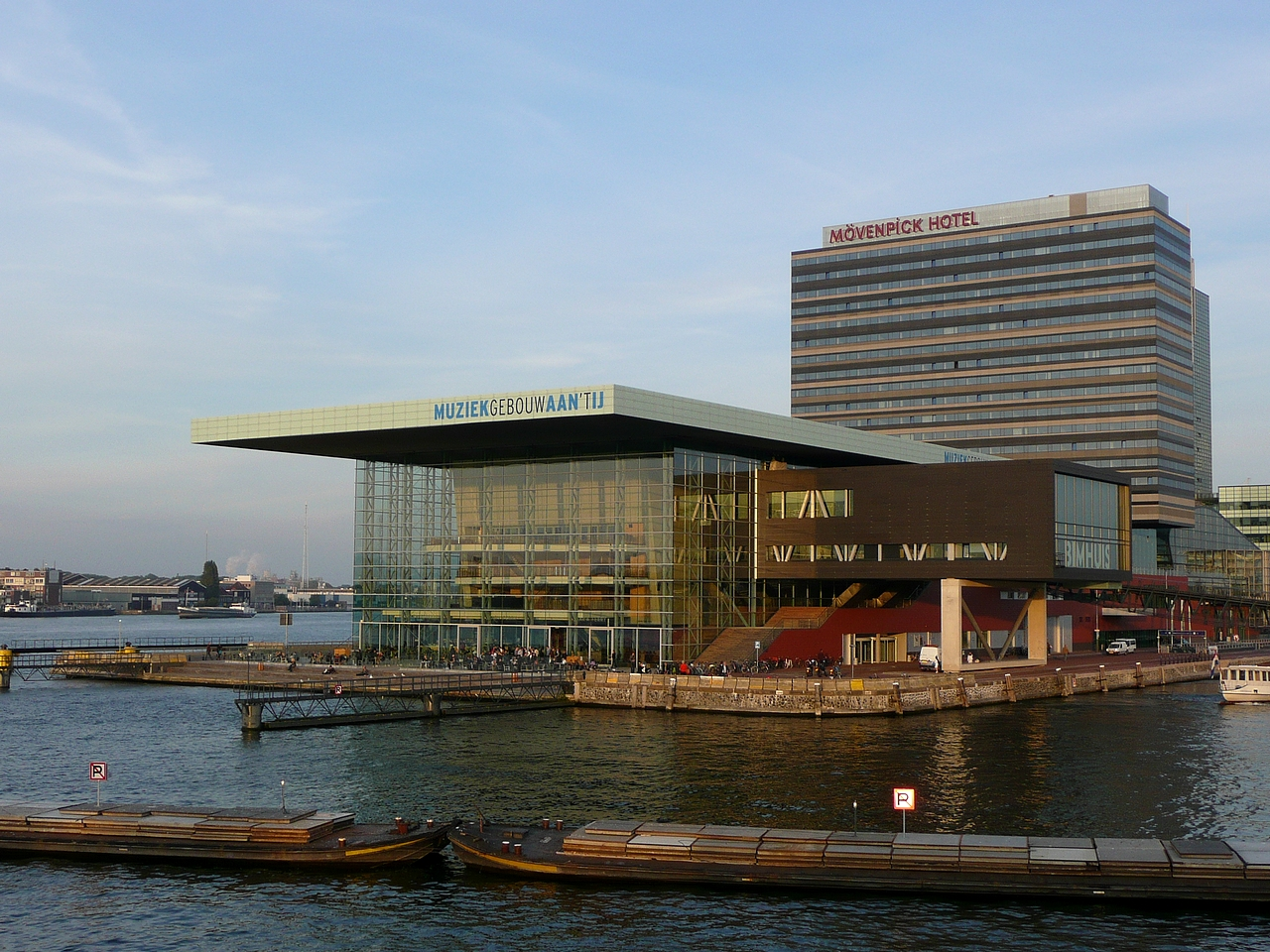
The Muziekgebouw aan 't IJ

Muziekgebouw aan 't IJ (English: "Music Building on the IJ") is the main concert hall for contemporary classical music on the IJ in Amsterdam, Netherlands. The building opened in 2005 and is located above the IJtunnel, a ten-minute walk from Amsterdam Centraal station. The building was designed by Danish architects 3XN. The Bimhuis is part of and partly integrated in the Muziekgebouw aan 't IJ.

== Background ==
Before the Muziekgebouw there was Muziekcentrum de IJsbreker located at the Weesperzijde that got shut down and replaced by the Muziekgebouw. Just like the IJsbreker the venue primarily focuses on contemporary classical music, while the Bimhuis is mainly focused on contemporary jazz music. Muziekgebouw aan 't IJ has one big concert space, but also a smaller one that is also used for conferences, talk, exhibitions. Also concerts take place at various other locations in the building such as the atrium and on the three large balconies above the restaurant. Often expositions of installations and sound art are programmed as well.

Yearly the World Minimal Music Festival and Holland Festival takes place in Muziekgebouw aan 't IJ. There is a monthly cross-over event called The Rest is Noise that involves experimental pop music in the agenda of the venue.

The first main and artistic director was Jan Wolff (2005–2008); Tino Haenen has been artistic director since June 2008. Haenen was previously director of the Belgian contemporary music festival Ars Musica. Since December 1, 2008 Boudewijn Berentsen is the main director, while Haenen stayed the artistic director. Since February 2012 Haenen is followed up by Maarten van Boven, formerly the vice-director of Paradiso.

== Education ==
IJsbreker was a pioneering organization in the field of education about experimental music for children. Originally named the Klankspeeltuin ('Sound playground') the education centre had a collection of interactive sound installations. Muziekgebouw continued the activity of the IJsbreker with a newly build collection and has an active education programme for children and teenagers. Over 400 workshops per year are held there, and is the biggest in Europe on this educational front. The Klankspeeltuin consists of a space filled with unique custom build experimental musical instruments. Around 2016 the old collection became outdated and suffered from a lot of technical flaws and the team, led by Anouk Diepenbroek, decided to renew the complete collection and replace if for smaller hands on instruments, instead of interactive installations. With this equipment the organisation also runs events on location. Also it is not only focused on children and teenagers anymore, but also gives more elaborate multiple day workshops for older people/students. For this project they approached a team of inventors to build a unique collection of experimental musical instruments for them. In June 2017 the Klankspeeltuin was renamed as the SoundLAB and currently owns 100 different instruments ranging from a series of ethnic instruments from all over the world to known odd instruments such as the theremin and the steel tongue drum to more unique designs by builders such as Yuri Landman, Arvid Jense, Diane Verdonk, Dato Instruments, Makey Makey, and others. Current director of the SoundLAB is Floortje Smehuijzen.

== Fokker Organ ==
Inside the Kleine Zaal (previously known as Bamzaal) there is also the microtonal 31-TET Fokker organ, designed by Adriaan Fokker. Regularly concerts take place on this organ.

== Offices ==
It houses the Holland Festival, Stichting Huygens-Fokker, Slagwerk Den Haag as well as many other Dutch music organisations. It also hosted some events of the 17th edition of the Sonic Acts Festival, in 2017.

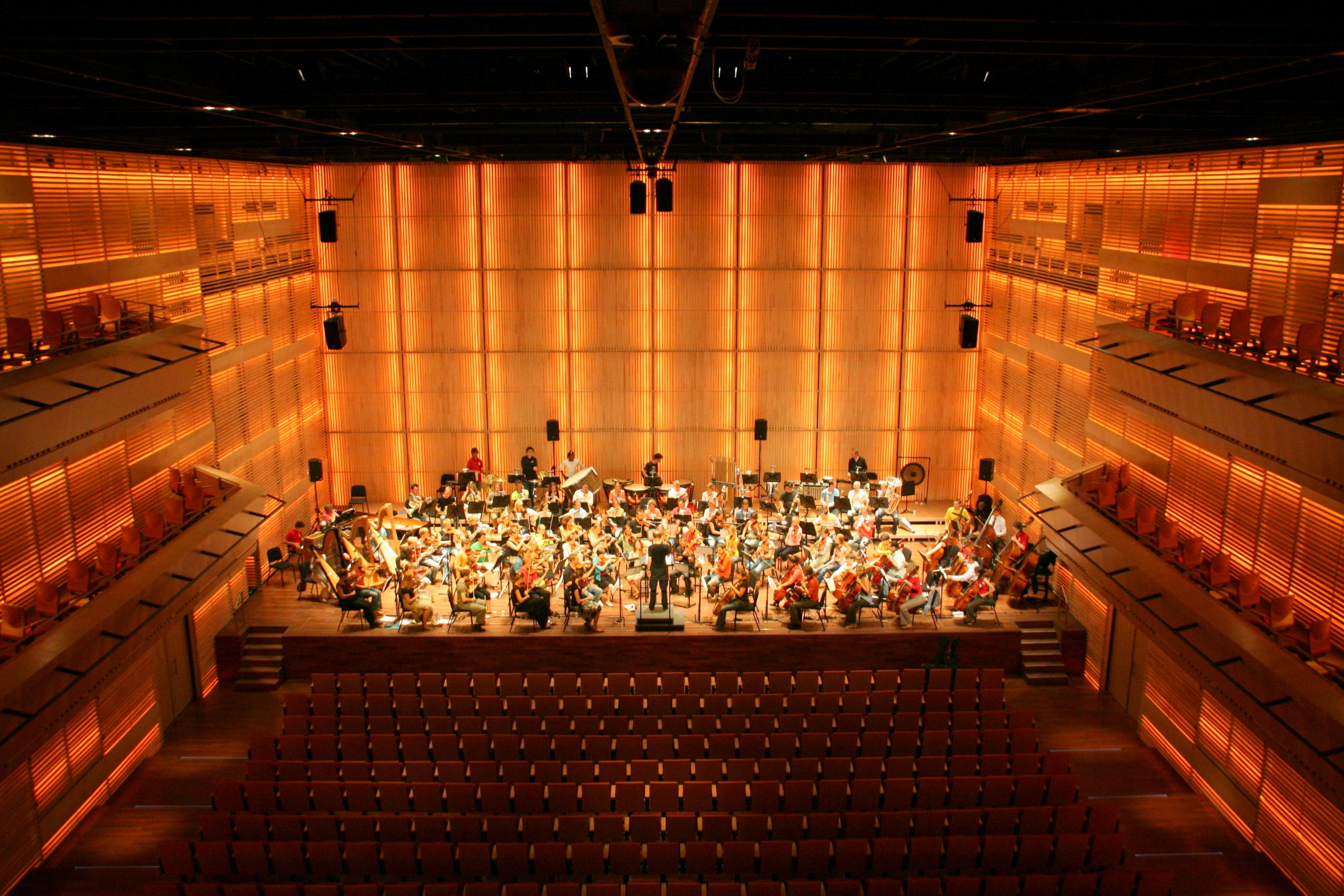
The venue's main hall (Grote Zaal)

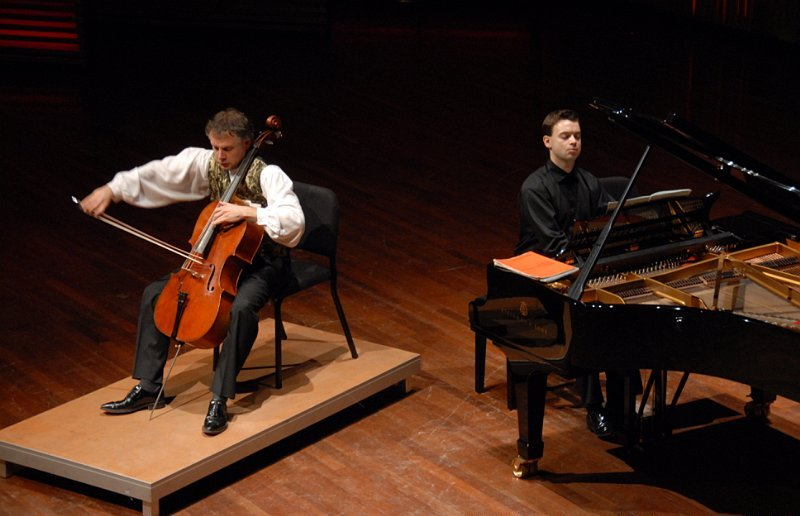
A concert by cellist Pieter Wispelwey

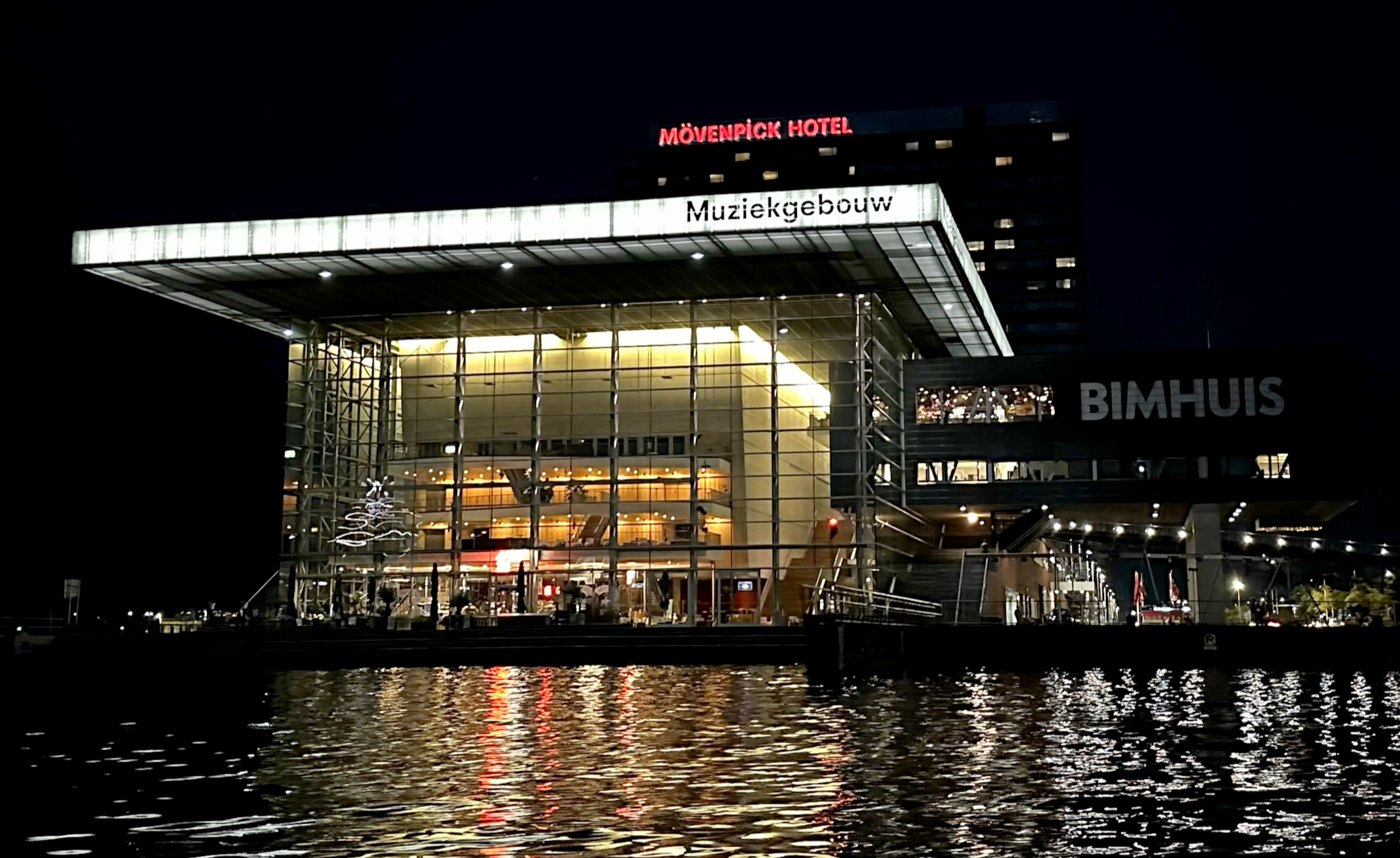
The Muziekgebouw and Bimhuis by night

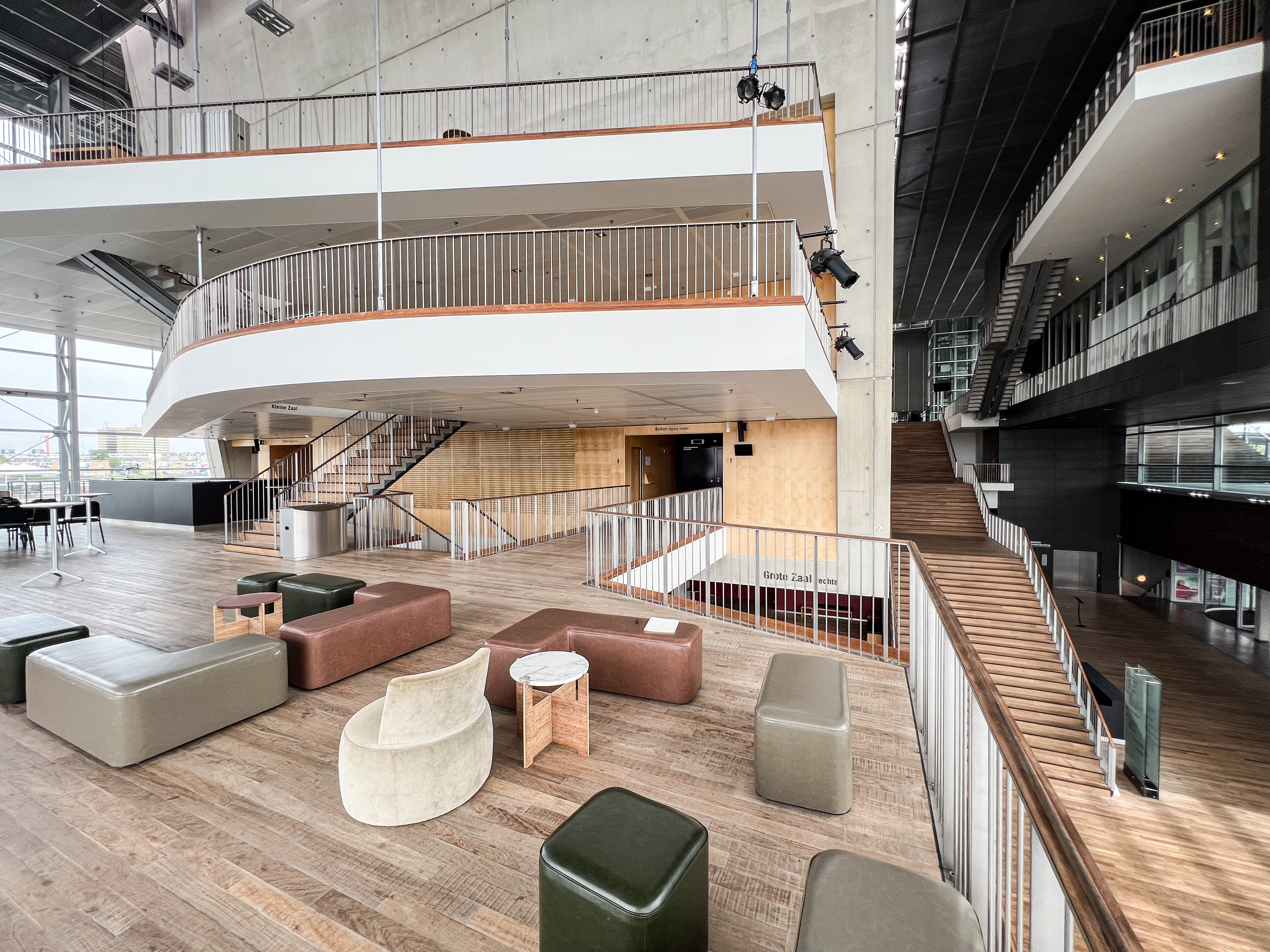
Part of the venue's foyer spaces

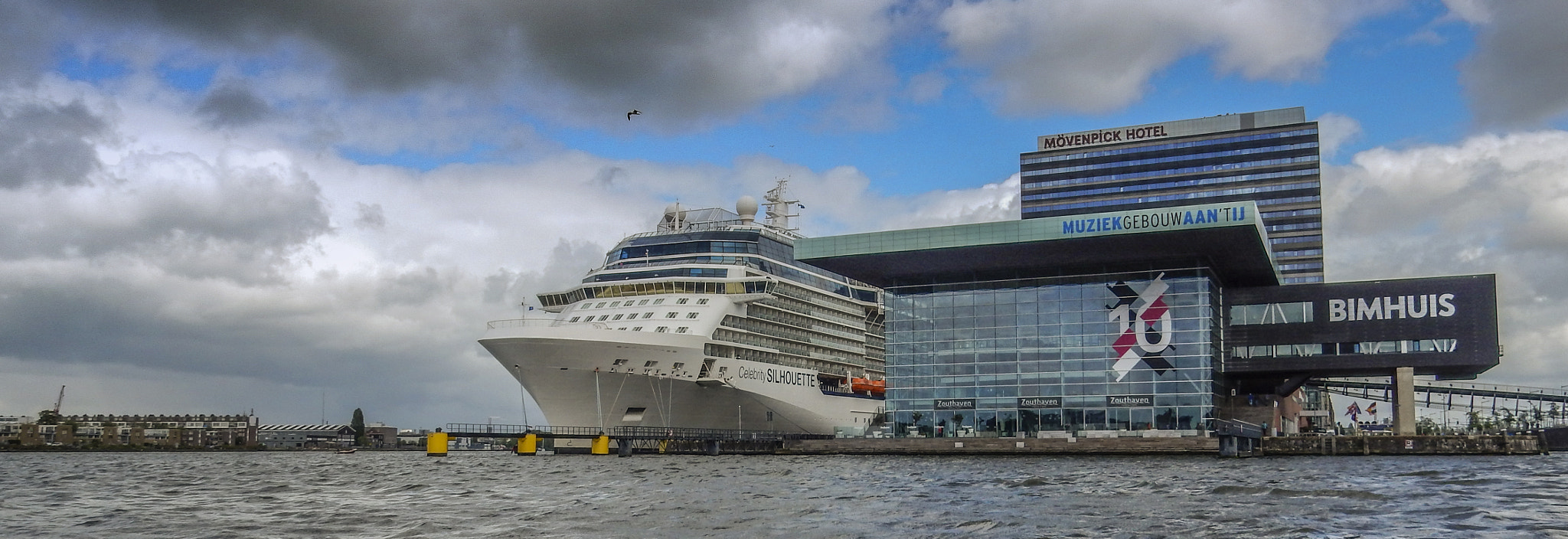
The Muziekgebouw and Bimhuis next to a cruise ship

== Architecture prizes ==
The building has received several prizes:

- The Grand Jury Piewie Prize (2006)
- Urban Land Institute Award for Excellence, category Europe (2006)
- Ballekes in tomat
