= Fitch Poole =

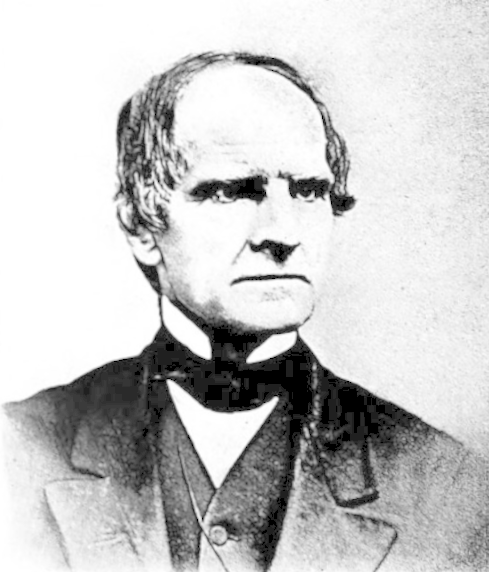
- Born: June 13, 1803; Salem, Massachusetts
- Died: August 19, 1873 (aged 70); Peabody, Massachusetts
- Occupation: Writer

Fitch Poole (1803–1873), also known as Fitch Poole Jr. or Fitch Poole Junior, was an American journalist, humorist, and politician.

== Biography ==
Poole Jr. was born on June 13, 1803, in Salem, Massachusetts (in an area that became Peabody after 1868), and was the son of Fitch Poole and Elizabeth Poole (Cutler). He was named after his father. Poole Jr. also had three other siblings, and one nephew.

Poole Jr. was the editor of the Danvers-based newspaper titled Wizard. He held this position for about nineteen years.

Fitch Poole Jr. was the president of Denver's Mechanic Institute (which afterward became known as the "Peabody Institute") from 1844 until 1853. He was also the founder of the Mechanics' Institute library, and held the first librarian position of the institute until the library’s opening in 1854, and later from 1856 until his death.

Poole was the author of different satirical ballads. One of his most well-known ballads is the "Giles Corey's Dream", which attracted a lot of interest.

Poole Jr. was the cousin of the surveyor, civil engineer, and educator Henry Ward Poole, and he was also the cousin of the famous bibliographer and librarian William Frederick Poole.

Poole died on August 19, 1873, at the age of 70 in Peabody, and is buried in the same place.
