= Huygens–Fokker Foundation =

Christiaan Huygens

The Huygens–Fokker Foundation (Dutch: Stichting Huygens-Fokker) is a "centre for microtonal music" founded on February 15, 1960, housed in the Muziekgebouw aan 't IJ (Amsterdam, Netherlands), and named for Christiaan Huygens and Adriaan Fokker (inventor of 31 equal temperament and creator of the Fokker organ). The Foundation's library possesses a large archive of correspondence, scores, books, and other publications. The Foundation presents frequent concerts (originally in Teylers Museum) presenting contemporary, early, popular, and improvised microtonal music. They maintain contact with other organizations dedicated to microtonality including Tonalsoft, the Harry Partch Institute, the Logos Foundation, and individuals such as Kyle Gann. They published the journal Thirty-One and presented MicroFest Amsterdam 2011. They house the 31-tone Fokker organ with new MIDI-connections in the BAM Hall. The current director is Sander Germanus.

== See also ==
- Carrillo-piano
- Euler-organ
- Euler–Fokker genus
- Acoustical Society of the Netherlands (Dutch: Nederlands Akoestisch Genootschap)
- Dutch Microtonal Society (Dutch: Nederlands Genootschap voor Microtonaliteit)
