= Greg Schiemer =

Gregory Marcellus Schiemer
- Born: Gregory Marcellus Schiemer; 16 January 1949 (age 77); Dunedoo, Australia
- Origin: Australia
- Genre: electronic music
- Occupations: electronic music composer, instrument builder, teacher, computer technician
- Website: https://satellitegamelan.com

Gregory Marcellus Schiemer (born 16 January 1949 in Dunedoo) is an Australian electronic music composer, instrument builder and teacher. His artistic preoccupations include creative engagement with technology, music created for non-expert performance and intercultural-interfaith dialogue.

== Background and training ==
Greg Schiemer was born on 16 January 1949 in Dunedoo, New South Wales. He attended Holy Cross College, Ryde (1961 to 1963), and finished high school in the Passionist minor seminary (from 1964) at St Ives and at the Sydney Technical College, Ultimo in 1968. He completed a B.Mus at Sydney University in 1972 where he studied composition with Peter Sculthorpe who introduced him to the music of Asia and the instruments of Harry Partch. Through David Ahern, he discovered experimental music and the work of Cornelius Cardew and John Cage.

Schiemer first worked in electronic music as a musical collaborator of Philippa Cullen in her electronic dance ensemble. He gradually learned the craft of electronics guided by Cullen's technical collaborators Phil Connor and Arthur Spring. Between 1972 and 1975, together they built some of the earliest electronic music systems that respond to dance movement. Between 1976 and 1981, Schiemer worked for Digital Equipment Australia, a division of Digital Equipment Corporation, initially in computer field service and later as senior design technician. In 1999 he completed a PhD in Electronics from Macquarie University for his thesis "MIDI Tool Box: An interactive system for music composition".

== Career ==
Schiemer taught electronic music composition at the Canberra School of Music from 1983. In November of that year as part of the city's Sunday in the Park spring program, he created the first of several broadcast electronic music events called ”A Concert on Bicycles". Participants cycle en masse around Lake Burley Griffin with transistor radios attached to their bicycle frames and tuned to local community radio station 2XX.

He relocated to the Sydney Conservatorium in 1986. There he mentored musicians working with new technology and participated in the activities of watt, the electro-acoustic group co-founded by composers Martin Wesley-Smith and Ian Fredericks. In 2003, he moved to the University of Wollongong where he was the lead chief investigator for Australian Research Council projects focused on mobile technology, haptic instruments and microtonal performance. He was Director of the Sonic Arts Research Network, coordinating interdisciplinary research involving sound across a variety of disciplines within Creative Arts, Informatics and Engineering. He supervised postgraduate composers and introduced undergraduate courses in Csound, Pure Data and circuit-bending.

Schiemer's creative work has typically involved performance using bespoke electronic instrument hardware which he designed, built and programmed. His work has been performed at international new music festivals such as GAUNG (2009, Bedugul), BIDAF [2014, Bandung], EUROMicroFest 2013 (Freiburg) and LA MicroFest (Los Angeles) and at concerts in conjunction with NIME (2006, Paris), and (2010, Sydney), ICMC (1993, Tokyo), (1996, Hong Kong), (2007, Belfast), DaFX (2007, Helsinki, ISEA (2008, Singapore and ICAD (2016, Canberra).

In 2009 he was invited by the Sacred Bridge Foundation to present mobile music performances with Indonesian musicians at workshops directed by Franki Raden Notosudirdjo, Stomu Yamash'ta and Jean-Claude Éloy. A concert program of his music for mobile instruments was presented in the 2012 Aurora Festival of Living Music in Western Sydney. Transposed Dekany, his entry in the 2012 International Space Time Concerto competition, hosted by the University of Newcastle in conjunction with Ars Electronica, was awarded Vice Chancellor's Prize. The work was realised by a consort of musicians located in multiple venues connected via the internet and performing with a purpose-built iPhone app, the Satellite Gamelan. Subsequent app revisions have been used in single venue concerts at EUROMicroFest, ICAD, LA MicroFest and Sydney MicroFest (2023).

== Instruments ==
His electronic instruments include:

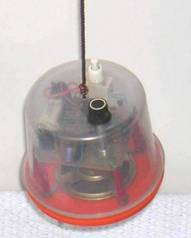
UFO

- Tupperware Gamelan (1977–1983) – a collection of instruments designed to be played by an ensemble of non-expert players. The instruments were invented by Schiemer, and named because electronics were mounted in plastic kitchenware while gamelan was a metaphor for collaborative musical engagement. They were easy to play and quick to learn and were used principally to accompany dance. They included battery-powered sound sources inspired by Bill Fontana called UFOs that produce the Doppler effect as a sound source moves. The UFOs first appeared in a choreographic project by Yen Lu Wong entitled Between Silence and Light which culminated in a dance performance on the northern boardwalk of the Sydney Opera House. They were digitally sequenced in 1983 to accompany a choreographic work by Kai Tai Chan entitled “Moving Sound/Falling Light”.

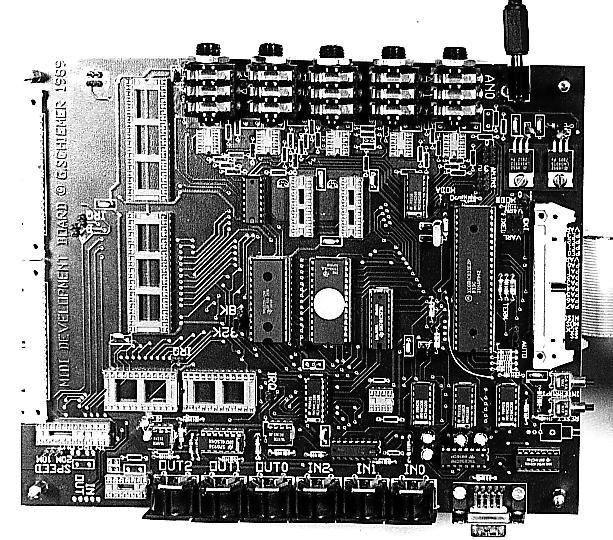
MIDI Tool Box

- MIDI Tool Box (1984–1996) – a microcontroller system for interactive composition. It grew from live algorithmic compositions Monophonic Variations and Polyphonic Variations which he created as firmware written for the Datum microcomputer and realised in collaboration with electro-percussionist Graeme Leak. The MIDI Tool Box system was used in an interactive broadcast event and in concert performances with remnants of the Tupperware Gamelan as well as performance and installation work created by other composers. The hardware eventually incorporated the A4 audio signal processor developed at CSIRO Division of Radiophysics and this was used in live concerts in 1995 with Carnatic violinist Krishna Kumar, and in 1996 with veena player Narayan Mani and Bharatnatyam-Kuchupudi choreographer Siri Rama.
- Pocket Gamelan (2003–) – a set of microtonal instruments realised as software developed by Schiemer for mobile phones. Inspired by the legacy of Partch, represented in the work of contemporary tuning theorist and microtonal instrument builder Erv Wilson, the Pocket Gamelan was developed in the java language. It has been used in live performances at international venues for computer music and microtonal musicLeading researchers have acknowledged the role the Pocket Gamelan has played in the development of performance with mobile devices.

== Compositions ==
- Body Sonata (1974)
- Porcelain Dialogue (1983)
- Monophonic Variations (1986)
- Polyphonic Variations (1988)
- Spectral Dance (1992)
- Token Objects (1993)
- Vedic Mass (1997)
- Tempered Dekanies (2001)
- Mandala 10 (2011)
- Transposed Dekany (2012)
- Six Dekanies (2023)

== Awards ==
- Australia Council Composers Fellowship 1994
- Vice Chancellor's Prize, Space Time Concerto Competition 2012
