= Adriaan Fokker =

Dutch physicist (1887–1972)

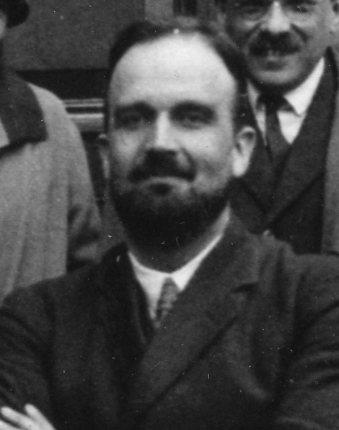
- Fokker in 1926
- Born: Adriaan Daniël Fokker; 17 August 1887; Buitenzorg, Dutch East Indies
- Died: 24 September 1972 (aged 85); Beekbergen, Netherlands
- Education: Leiden University (PhD)
- Known for: Fokker–Planck equation; Fokker periodicity block
- Relatives: Anthony Fokker (cousin)
- Scientific career
- Fields: Physics; musicology
- Workplaces: Leiden University (1917–21); Technische Hoogeschool Delft (1923–28); Teylers Museum (1928–55)
- Thesis: Over Brown'sche bewegingen in het stralingsveld, en waarschijnlijkheidsbeschouwingen in de stralingstheorie (1913)
- Doctoral advisor: Hendrik Lorentz

Adriaan Daniël Fokker (Dutch: [ˈaːdrijaːn ˈdaːnijɛl ˈfɔkər]; 17 August 1887 – 24 September 1972) was a Dutch physicist and musicologist who worked in the fields of special relativity and statistical mechanics. He is the inventor of the Fokker organ, a 31-tone equal-tempered (31-TET) organ.

== Early life and education ==
Adriaan Daniël Fokker was born on 17 August 1887 in Buitenzorg, Dutch East Indies (now Bogor, Indonesia), the son of Anthony Herman Gerard Fokker, president of the Batavia branch of the Netherlands Trading Society, and Susanna Alida der Kinderen. He was a cousin of the aircraft manufacturer Anthony Fokker. In 1894, his family returned to the Netherlands.

A.D. Fokker in his organ in 1950

Fokker studied physics at Technische Hoogeschool Delft (now Delft University of Technology) and Leiden University, where he received his Ph.D. under Hendrik Lorentz in 1913. In his thesis, he derived the Fokker–Planck equation along with Max Planck. He continued his studies with Albert Einstein at Zurich, Ernest Rutherford at Manchester, and W. H. Bragg at Leeds.

== Career ==
In 1917, after his military service during World War I, Fokker returned to Leiden University as an assistant to Hendrik Lorentz and Paul Ehrenfest. In 1921, he became a physics teacher at the Gymnasium of Delft, and in 1923 was appointed Professor of Applied Physics at Technische Hoogeschool Delft. In 1928, he succeeded Lorentz as Curator of the Physical Cabinet at Teylers Museum in Haarlem, a position he held until his retirement in 1955.

Fokker made several contributions to special relativity, and some less well-known contributions to general relativity, particularly in the area of geodetic precession, the phenomena of precession of a freely falling gyroscope in a gravitational field. Also absorber theory of electrodynamics.

Fokker began to study music theory during the Second World War, when Leiden University was closed; partly this was due to a desire to convince the Nazis he would be of no use to the war effort, and partly it was a response to reading the work of Christiaan Huygens on the 31 equal temperament.

In 1938, Fokker – along with Dirk Coster and Otto Hahn – helped Austrian Jewish physicist Lise Meitner escape from Nazi-occupied Austria to the Netherlands. Historian Ruth Lewin Sime writes

"Fokker and Coster both knew that university positions were virtually unavailable for foreigners. Laboratory space was not a problem, however, either in Groningen or Haarlem. 'Perhaps we can tap colleagues for regular contributions,' Coster suggested. Fokker set a goal of f.20,000, enough to support Meitner for five years, and immediately began contacting colleagues for advice and donations."

They were unsuccessful in obtaining funding, but Fokker succeeded in getting official permission for Meitner to leave, although he was unable to telegraph that to her due to secrecy. She escaped barely in time to evade arrest.

The year 1942 consequently marked a turning point in his life; after then he wrote many pieces in 31-equal, which are notable for using the 7th harmonic as a consonant interval (31-equal has a much better approximation of the 7th harmonic than the ubiquitous 12-equal). He also made notable contributions to music theory, such as the Fokker periodicity block.

In 1949, Fokker became a Member of the Royal Netherlands Academy of Arts and Sciences.

Fokker died on 24 September 1972 in Beekbergen at the age of 85.

=== Musical instruments ===
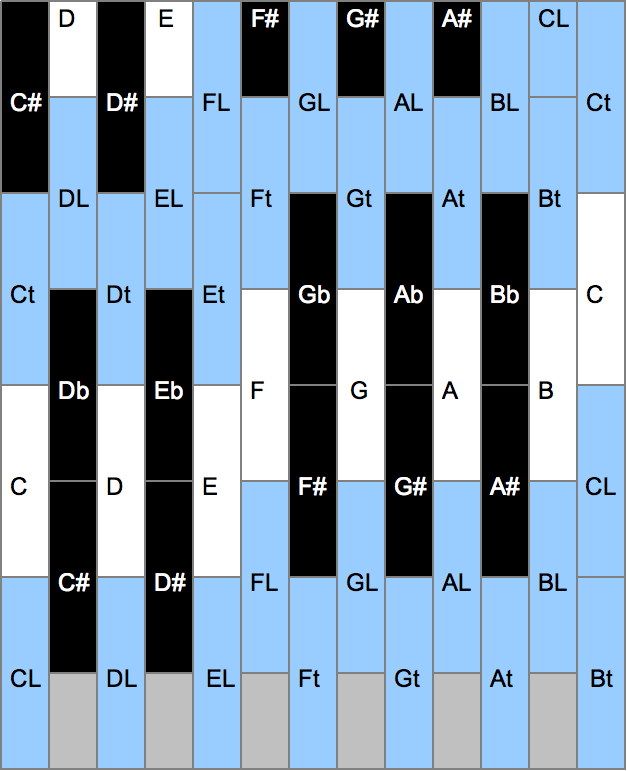
Schematic representation of Fokker's microtonal keyboard for a 31EDO pipe organ (Fokker organ) with two manuals and pedal, built by him.

Fokker designed and had built a number of keyboard instruments capable of playing microtonal scales via a generalized keyboard. The best-known of these is his 31-tone equal-tempered organ, which was installed in Teyler's Museum in Haarlem in 1951. It is commonly called the Fokker organ. The Fokker organ is currently property of the Huygens-Fokker Foundation and it moved to the Bamzaal in Muziekgebouw aan 't IJ. Regularly concerts take place on this instrument in the Bamzaal.

== See also ==
- Action at a distance
- Archicembalo, another instrument that was sometimes tuned in 31TET.
- Born rigidity
- Euler–Fokker genus
- Geodetic effect
- Nordström's theory of gravitation
- Relativistic center of mass
