= Erv Wilson =

Music theorist (1928–2016)

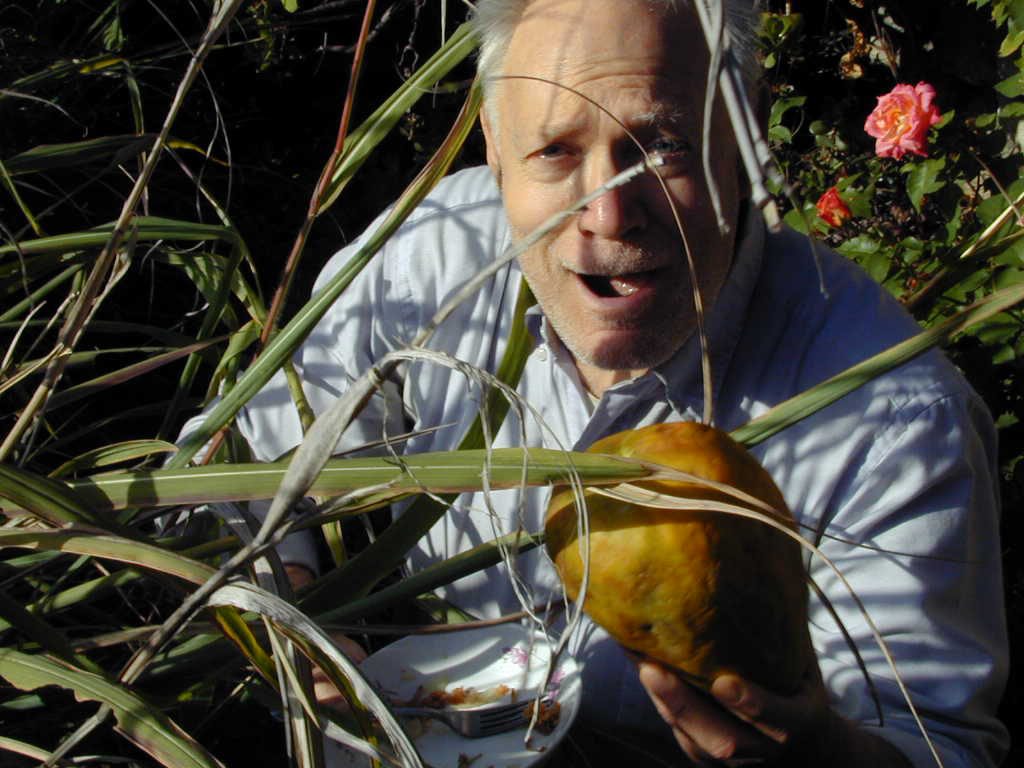
Erv Wilson in his garden

Ervin Wilson (June 11, 1928 – December 8, 2016) was a Mexican/American (dual citizen) music theorist.

== Early life ==
Ervin Wilson was born in Colonia Pacheco, a small village in the remote mountains of northwest Chihuahua, Mexico, where he lived until the age of fifteen. His mother taught him to play the reed organ and to read musical notation. He began to compose at an early age, but immediately discovered that some of the sounds he was hearing mentally could not be reproduced by the conventional intervals of the organ. As a teenager, he began to read books on Indian music, developing an interest in concepts of raga. While he was in the Air Force in Japan, a chance meeting with a total stranger introduced him to musical harmonics, which changed the course of his life and work. Influenced by the work of Joseph Yasser, Wilson began to think of the musical scale as a living process—like a crystal or plant.

== Works ==
Despite his avoidance of academia, Wilson has been influential on those interested in microtonal music and just intonation, especially in the areas of scale, keyboard, and notation design. Among his developments are Moments of Symmetry, Combination Product Sets, Golden Horograms, scales based on recurrence relations (scales of "Mt. Meru"), and mapping scales to the generalized keyboard. He cited Augusto Novaro and Joseph Yasser as influences. Wilson built instruments and explored the resources of 31 and 41 equal divisions of the octave. He supported the work of Harry Partch, proposing the design of the Quadrangularis Reversum and helping build the instrument, as well as providing diagrams for Partch's book Genesis of a Music.

The goal of Wilson's research with scales was to make them musically accessible to the composer and the listener. "I sculpt in the architecture of the scale. Other people come along and animate it."

== Musicians influenced by Wilson ==
- Warren Burt
- Jim French
- Kraig Grady
- Jose Hales-Garcia
- Catherine Lamb
- Terumi Narushima
- Paul Rapoport
- Emil Richards
- Marcus Satellite
- Greg Schiemer
- Stephen James Taylor
- Daniel James Wolf
