= Prepared guitar =

Musical instrument

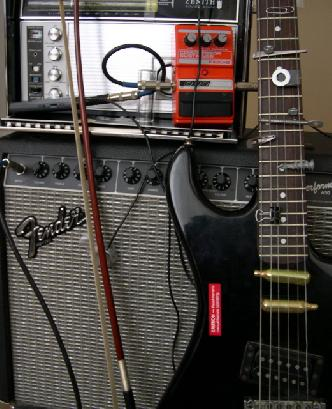
A prepared guitar

A prepared guitar is a guitar that has had its timbre altered by placing various objects on or between the instrument's strings, including other extended techniques. This practice is sometimes called tabletop guitar, because many prepared guitarists do not hold the instrument in the usual manner, but instead place the guitar on a table to manipulate it.

The idea of altering an instrument's timbre through the use of external objects has been applied to other instruments as well, most notably John Cage's prepared piano, which preceded the prepared guitar.

== History ==
With prepared guitars, one of the key goals in preparing the instrument is changing its timbre – the fundamental tone composition of the sound. This is typically achieved by placing objects on or under the strings. The objects can have a tone of their own, like for instance a pen spring, but can also cause strange string resonance effects or behave like a seesaw and create echoing or buzzing effects after being struck and swinging like a balance. Many of the sounds sound more or less like clocks, bells or Non Western musical instruments or even non string percussion instruments.

=== Bjørn Fongaard ===
The history of Norwegian composer and guitar player Bjørn Fongaard (1919–1980) probably marks the first steps into prepared guitar. He started off by constructing a quarter tone guitar with adaption of the fretboard, but very early left this in favour of a diverse set of prepared guitar techniques. His first pieces in this genre came in the mid-1960s.

=== Keith Rowe ===
The method of actually preparing the guitar was developed in the late 1960s by Keith Rowe, in imitation of Jackson Pollock's painting method and John Cage's prepared piano. Rowe developed various prepared guitar techniques: placing the guitar flat on a table and manipulating the strings, body and pickups in unorthodox ways to produce sounds described as dark, brooding, compelling, expansive and alien. He has been known to employ objects such as a library card, rubber eraser, springs, hand-held electric fans, alligator clips, and common office supplies in playing the guitar.

=== Fred Frith ===
Another pioneer was Fred Frith who in 1974 released a solo album called Guitar Solos. The album comprises eight tracks of unaccompanied and improvised music played on prepared guitars by Frith. The album was recorded using a modified 1936 Gibson K-11. Frith added an extra pickup over the strings at the nut, enabling him to amplify sound from both sides of the fretted note. He then split the fretboard in two with a capo, effectively giving him two guitars, each amplified separately, that he could play independently with each hand. To split the sounds further he attached alligator clips at various positions on the strings. The net result was a guitar with multiple sound sources that could be channeled to a mixer and distributed across the stereo soundscape.

=== Other prepared guitarists ===
In the 1980s Glenn Branca, Sonic Youth and other experimental art rockers also utilized prepared guitars. Koka Nikoladze developed a preparation technique, which afterwards was named "Nikoladze" Preparation. In this case an acoustic guitar was prepared with a certain type of a light bulb and produced synthetic - alike sound. The beautiful demonstration of upper mentioned technique is the composition "Starshine ~" for violin, prepared guitar and percussion.

Other contemporary prepared guitar composers/performers include:

- Dani Rabin of Marbin incorporated prepared guitar into the jazz-rock style in a non-avant-garde fashion.
- Duane Denison used prepared guitar with The Jesus Lizard and Legendary Shack Shakers.
- GP Hall (active since the late 1960s) uses a variety of guitars played with implements including psaltery bows, palette knives, electric fans and razors, wind-up toys, velcro and crocodile clips. Some of Hall's techniques are similar to Keith Rowe's methods but are applied to a much more melodic compositional and improvisational style.
- Steve Parry of Hwyl Nofio uses a prepared guitar technique and developed a bowed device based on the violin, utilizing paper clips, nails, a razor, pliers, bow, automata.
- Koka Nikoladze developed a guitar preparation technique with light bulb (2009), and played a standard acoustic guitar as a bowed instrument.
- Martín Irigoyen (of Vernian Process) and Erik Sanko both use electronic devices, hand ventilators, walkie-talkies, paper clips, aluminum foil, credit cards and tweezers.
- Nikita Koshkin uses cork, matches and foam mutes.
- Jacques Palinckx (active from the 1980s) from the Netherlands uses vibrators, radios, toys and knives.
- Cor Fuhler uses multiple vibrators and 3rd bridge on acoustic guitar.
- Micachu uses unorthodox instruments which are sometimes customised or homemade. These included a modified guitar played with a hammer action, called a 'chu'. Other is a short scaled children guitar with an additional third bridge next to the sound hole which shortens the scale length, leading to an alternate microtonal division of the intervals.
- These Are Powers use a bass guitar with a rod placed between the strings and the body to shorten the string length, as well as playing behind that additional bridge like a tailed bridge guitar.
- Michael Chorney plays prepared-guitar
- Shane Parish of Ahleuchatistas places a wire in front of the bridge in some songs.
- Paolo Angeli uses a "Sardinian prepared guitar": an orchestra-instrument with 18 cords, a hybrid between guitar, cello and drums, gifted with hammers, pedals at variable speed.

== Custom made instruments ==
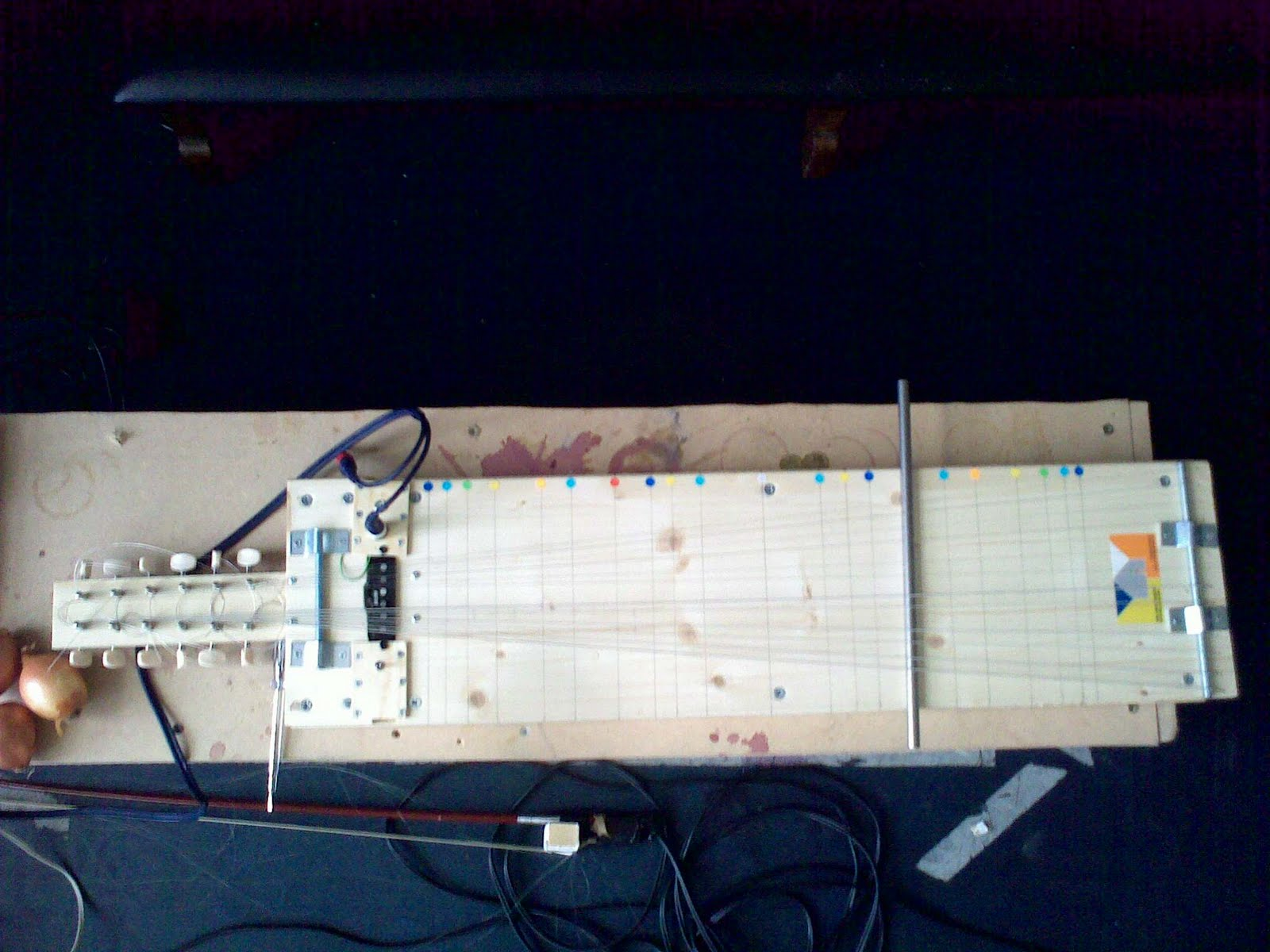
A Home Swinger, 3rd bridge zither

Beginning in the 1970s, guitarist and luthier Hans Reichel made some unusual guitars with third bridge-like qualities.

Yuri Landman derived a just intoned musical scale from an initially considered atonal prepared guitar playing technique based on adding a 3rd bridge under the strings. He constructed an instrument called the Moodswinger with this scale. When this bridge is positioned in the noded positions of the harmonic series the volume of the instrument increases and the overtone becomes clear and has a consonant relation to the complementary opposed string part creating a harmonic multiphonic tone.

== See also ==
- Electroacoustic improvisation
- Experimental luthier
- Experimental musical instrument
- Kotar (instrument)
- Prepared music, a disambiguation page for prepared instruments
- Prepared piano
- String resonance
- Tritare

== Prepared guitar luthiers ==
- Glenn Branca
- Yuri Landman
- Bradford Reed
- Hans Reichel

== Notable prepared guitar players ==
- Derek Bailey
- Glenn Branca
- Scott Fields
- Dominic Frasca
- Fred Frith
- GP Hall
- Koka Nikoladze
- Martín Irigoyen
- Nikita Koshkin
- Yuri Landman
- Thurston Moore
- Steve Parry
- Lee Ranaldo
- Keith Rowe
- Marc Ribot
- David Tronzo
- Reynaldo Young
- Jon Wilson of Meat Beat Manifesto
- Reentko Dirks

== Literature ==
- Prepared Guitar Techniques - Matthew Elgart/Peter Yates (Elgart/Yates Guitar Duo) ISBN 978-0-939297-99-3, California Guitar Archives, 2020.
- Nice Noise - Bart Hopkin & Yuri Landman ISBN 978-0-972-731-36-2, published by Experimental Musical Instruments, 2012.
- The Unorthodox Guitar - ISBN 978-0199381852 Mike Frengel, Oxford University Press, 2017.
