= Electric guitar design =

Electric guitar design is a type of industrial design where the looks and efficiency of the shape as well as the acoustical aspects of the guitar are important factors. In the past many guitars have been designed with various odd shapes as well as very practical and convenient solutions to improve the usability of the object.

== History ==
George Beauchamp is occasionally credited with inventing the electric guitar by designing a lap steel guitar with a pickup, though a lap steel does not have functional frets or a standard guitar-type neck.

The earliest "electrified" fretted guitars were hollow-bodied archtop acoustic guitars to which some form of electromagnetic transducer had been attached. The first commercial electrified guitar was the Electro-Spanish Ken Roberts model produced from 1931 to 1936 by Rickenbacker, with one Beauchamp-designed pickup and an early "Vib-rola" hand vibrato created by Doc Kauffman.

=== Early years ===
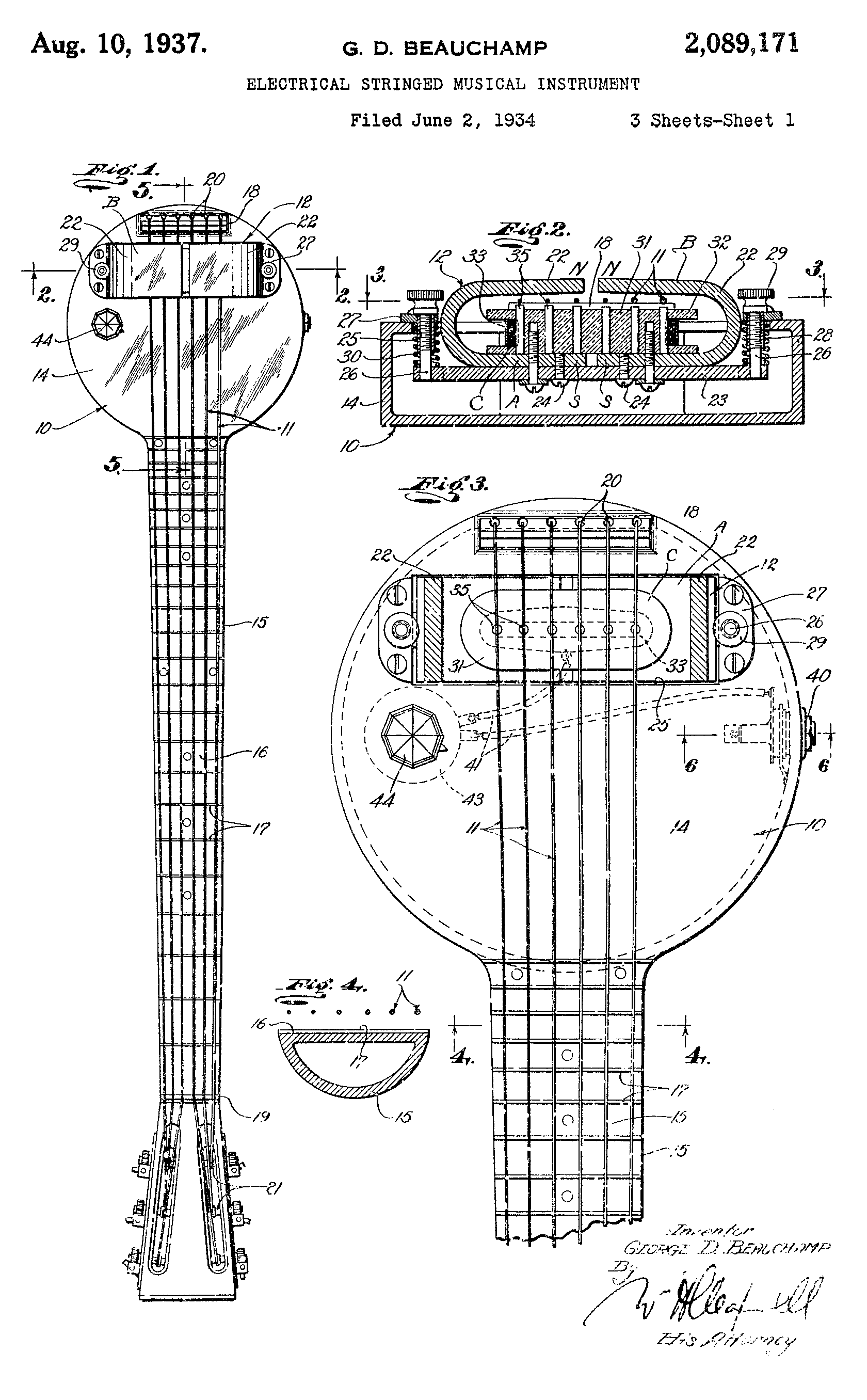
Sketch of Rickenbacker "frying pan" lap steel guitar from 1934 patent application

Paul Tutmarc built and may have offered an electric solid-body guitar as early as 1932, under the brand "Audiovox". Tutmarc is also credited as the co-inventor of the magnetic pickup along with Art Stimpson, and the fretted electric bass guitar.

Bob Wisner worked for Tutmarc, converting tube radio amplifiers into guitar amplifiers (eventually developing his own amplifier circuits) so Tutmarc's instruments could be sold matched up with amplifiers. Paul was unsuccessful at obtaining a patent for his magnetic pickup as it was too similar to the telephone microphone coil sensor device.

Audiovox production was handed over to Paul's son, Bud Tutmarc, who continued building these instruments under the "Bud-Electro" brand until the early 1950s. Bud Tutmarc had been delegated by the senior Tutmarc the task of winding the pickup coils, and he continued producing them for his own guitars. He used horseshoe magnets in a single-coil and later a hum-cancelling dual-coil configuration.

When Wisner was hired by Rickenbacher (later Rickenbacker), he may have passed along Tutmarc's magnetic pickup design, which strongly resembles the pickup on their cast aluminum lap steel guitar, nicknamed The Frying Pan or The Pancake Guitar, released in 1933.

Another early solid-body electric guitar was built by musician and inventor Les Paul in the early 1940s, working after hours in the Epiphone Guitar factory. His log guitar (a wood post with a neck attached to it and two hollow body halves attached to the sides for appearance only) was patented, and is often considered to be the first of its kind, although it shares nothing of design or hardware in common with the solid-body "Les Paul" model later created by Gibson.

=== Fender ===
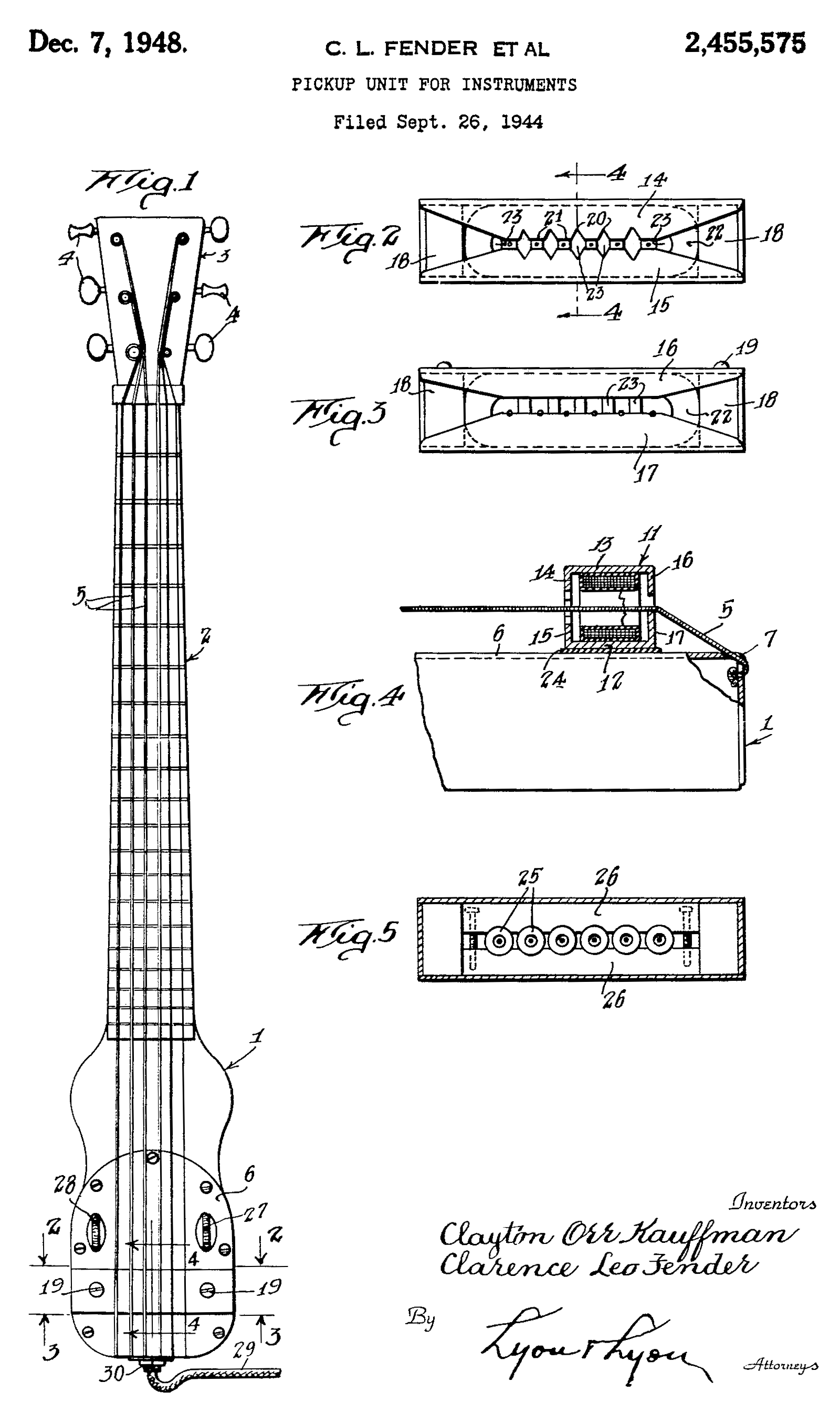
Sketch of Fender lap steel guitar from 1944 patent application.

In 1950 and 1951, amplifier builder Leo Fender designed the first commercially successful solid-body electric guitar with a single magnetic pickup, which was initially named the "Esquire". The later two-pickup version of the Esquire was called the "Broadcaster". The bolt-on neck was consistent with Leo Fender's belief that the instrument design should be modular to allow cost-effective and consistent manufacture and assembly, as well as simplified repair or replacement. The Broadcaster name was changed to Telecaster because of a legal dispute over the name.

In 1954, the Fender Electric Instrument Company introduced the Fender Stratocaster, or "Strat". It was positioned as a deluxe model and offered various product improvements and innovations over the Telecaster, often based upon responses from working musicians. These innovations included an ash or alder double-cutaway body design, with an integrated vibrato mechanism (called a synchronized tremolo by Fender, thus beginning a confusion of the terms that still continues), three single-coil pickups, and "comfort contours" where the body edges are significantly contoured. Leo Fender is also credited with developing the first commercially successful electric bass, the Fender Precision Bass, introduced in 1951.

=== Gibson ===
The more traditionally designed and styled Gibson solid-body instruments were a contrast to Leo Fender's modular designs and heavily contoured "slab" bodies, with the most notable differentiator being the method of neck attachment and the scale of the neck (Gibson-24.75", Fender-25.5").

Gibson, like many guitar manufacturers, had long offered semi-acoustic guitars with pickups, and previously rejected Les Paul and his "log" electric in the 1940s. In apparent response to the Telecaster, Gibson introduced the first Gibson Les Paul solid body guitar in 1952 (Les Paul was brought in only towards the end of the design process for details of the design and for marketing endorsement ). Features of the Les Paul include a solid mahogany body with a carved maple top (much like a violin and earlier Gibson archtop hollow body electric guitars) and contrasting edge binding, two single-coil "soapbar" pickups, a 24¾" scale mahogany neck with a more traditional glued-in "set" neck joint, binding on the edges of the fretboard, and a tilt-back headstock with three machine heads (tuners) to a side. The earliest version had a combination bridge and trapeze-tailpiece design as specified by Les Paul himself, but was largely disliked and discontinued after the first year.

Gibson then developed the Tune-o-matic bridge and separate stop tailpiece, an adjustable non-vibrato design still in wide use. By 1957, Gibson had made the final major change to the Les Paul of today - the humbucking pickup, or humbucker. The pickup, invented by Seth Lover, was a dual-coil pickup which featured two windings connected out-of-phase and reverse-wound, in order to cancel the 60-cycle mains hum that plagued single-coil pickups; as a byproduct, the two-coil design also produces a distinctive, more "mellow" tone which appeals to many guitarists.

=== Vox ===
In 1962 Vox introduced the pentagonal Phantom guitar, originally made in England but soon after made by EKO of Italy. It was followed a year later by the teardrop-shaped Mark VI, the prototype of which was used by Brian Jones of The Rolling Stones. Vox guitars also experimented with onboard effects and electronics. The Teardrop won a prize for its design. In the mid 1960s, as the sound of electric 12 string guitar became popular, Vox introduced the Phantom XII and Mark XII electric 12 string guitars. Vox produced many more traditional 6 and 12 string electric guitars in both England and Italy. It may be noted that the Phantom guitar shape was quite similar to that of first fretted electric bass guitar, the Audiovox "Electric Bass Fiddle" of 1934.

In 1966 Vox introduced the revolutionary but problematic GuitarOrgan, a Phantom VI guitar with internal organ electronics. The instrument's trigger mechanism required a specially-wired plectrum that completed circuit connections to each fret, resulting in a very wide and unwieldy neck. John Lennon was given one in a bid to secure an endorsement, though this never panned out. According to Up-Tight: the Velvet Underground Story, Brian Jones of the Rolling Stones also tried one; when asked by the Velvets if it "worked", his answer was negative. The instrument never became popular, but it was a precursor to the modern guitar synthesizer.

=== Multiscale/Fanned-Fret Guitars ===
In recent years, guitars and basses with multi-scale or fanned-fret fingerboards started to appear. These instruments are supposed to offer an advantage over the classical fixed-scale guitars and basses by providing more freedom in setting the tension of each string at the design and manufacturing phases. This may result in a more uniform tension of the strings, as well as possibly offer timbre and tonal characteristics somewhat different from the usual fixed-scale instruments.

== Variant designs ==
Materials other than wood have been used. Travis Bean and Kramer built guitars with aluminium necks. The Gittler guitar was a "skeleton" design from the late 1970s, largely stainless steel.

In 1979, for the Chicago NAMM trade show, Ibanez built a 76-pound solid-brass guitar, primarily as an attention-getting gimmick but also to demonstrate that while such extreme mass would provide very long note sustain (a characteristic sought by many guitarists), the tonal qualities suffered.

Various plastics and composites have been employed. Some hollow-body Danelectro had Masonite body shells. The Ampeg guitars designed by Dan Armstrong pioneered acrylic as a body material. Fiberglass was used by Valco (called "Res-O-Glas") for some models of hollow-body "Airline" guitars sold through Montgomery Ward. Carbon fiber has been used for necks as well as bodies.

1991 saw the introduction of guitar designer Jol Dantzig's first truly workable acoustic-electric hybrid guitar design. The instrument, called the DuoTone, was conceived while Dantzig was at Hamer Guitars. (Dantzig was also the designer of the first 12 string bass.) Adapted by players like Ty Tabor, Stone Gossard, Elvis Costello and Jeff Tweedy, the DuoTone was a full "duplex" instrument that could switch between acoustic and electric tones. Recently there have been many entries in the hybrid category (capable of both acoustic and electric tones) including the T5 by Taylor, Michael Kelly's "Hybrid," the Parker Fly and the Anderson Crowdster.

In the 90s the band Neptune began building a weird metal guitar with 3rd bridge options incorporated. A predecessor of this type of guitars is the Pencilina. Linda Manzer designed the Pikasso guitar with multiple necks.

== See also ==
- Bolt-on construction
- Set neck construction
- Through-neck construction
- Experimental luthier
- Experimental musical instrument
- Leo Fender
- Doc Kauffman
- Seth Lover
- Paul Bigsby
- Paul Reed Smith
- Ken Parker
- Grover Jackson
- Wayne Charvel
- John D'Angelico
- Jimmy D'Aquisto
- Gary Kramer
- Travis Bean
