= Yuri Landman =

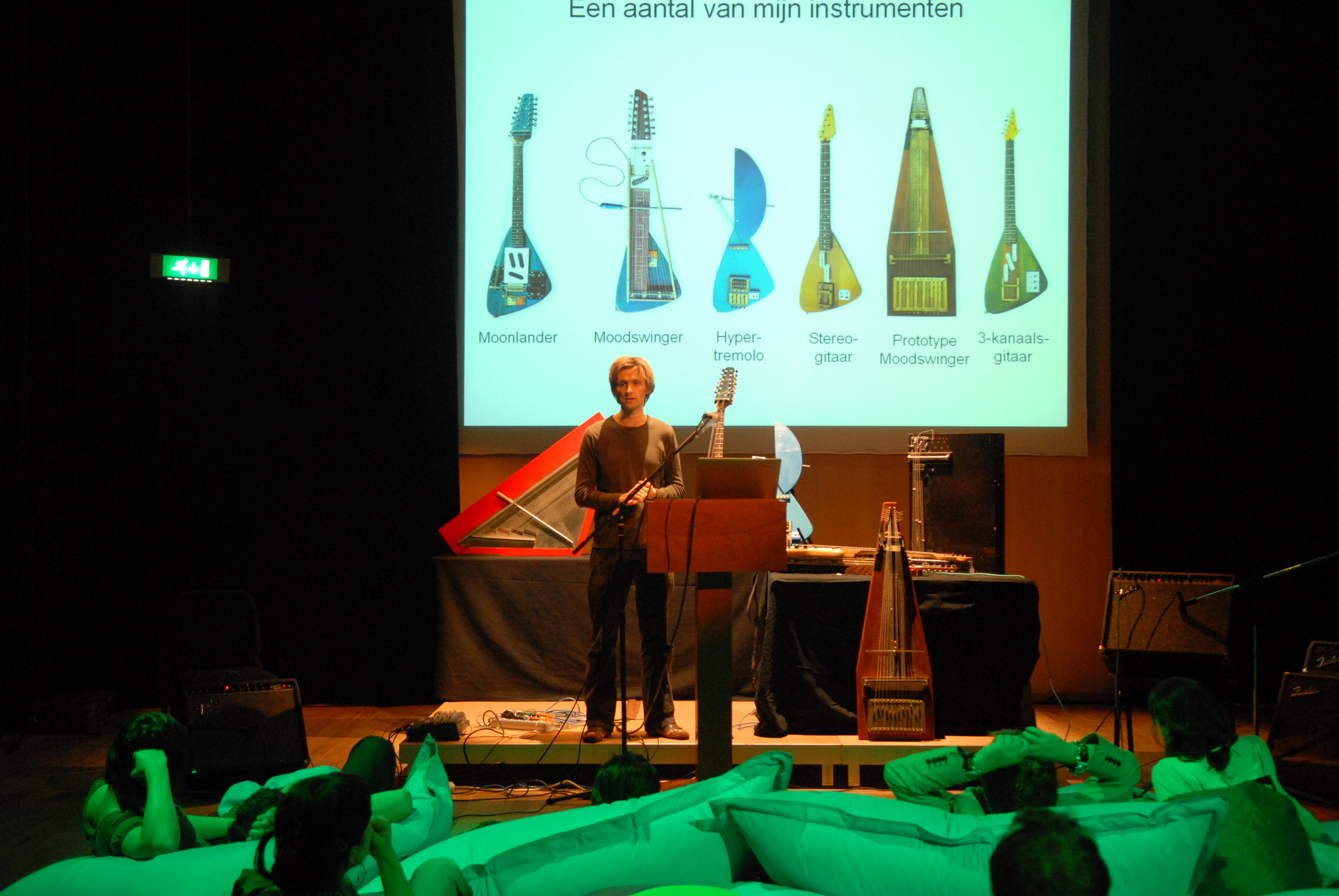
- Yuri Landman @ Output Festival 2007

Background information
- Born: Yuri Landman; 1 February 1973 (age 53); Zwolle
- Origin: The Netherlands
- Occupations: Experimental luthier, musician, comic artist
- Years active: 1996 - present
- Labels: Thick Syrup, Geertruida Records, Siluh Records
- Website: www.hypercustom.nl

Yuri Landman (born 1 February 1973) is a Dutch inventor of musical instruments and musician who has made several experimental electric string instruments for a number of artists including Lee Ranaldo of Sonic Youth, Liars, Jad Fair of Half Japanese, Liam Finn, and Laura-Mary Carter. Besides his musical activities he is also a graphic novel artist.

== Biography ==
Yuri Landman started as a comic book artist and made his debut in the comics field in 1997 with 'Je Mag Alles Met Me Doen' (in Dutch). In the follow-up, released in 1998, 'Het Verdiende Loon', Landman described his negative experiences on a daily job. For the second title he received the 1998 Breda Prize, an award for rising new comic artists in the Netherlands. Since then he has published no other comic books. Soon after the release he took over a local comic book store and started his graphic design studio inside the shop besides the sales of comics.

Together with Cees van Appeldoorn, he formed the lo-fi band Zoppo playing bass and prepared guitar in 1997. After 2 albums and several 7" singles, Landman left the band in 2000. Landman then formed the noise band Avec Aisance (aka Avec-A) with drummer/producer Valentijn Höllander and released a CD, Vivre dans l'aisance in 2004. After quitting Avec-A in 2006, he focused mainly on instrument building. His comic shop closed in 2001 and he was the graphic designer for Oog & Blik from 2001 till 2010, until the instrument business became his full-time activity.

Landman is musically untrained and cannot play chords. Unsatisfied about the limitations of prepared guitars Landman began creating and building several experimental string instruments, including electric zithers, electric Cymbalum, and electric Koto. Many of the designs are focused on string resonance, microtonality and an overtoning spectra based on the no wave aesthetics of Glenn Branca and the microtonal consonant theory developed by Harry Partch.

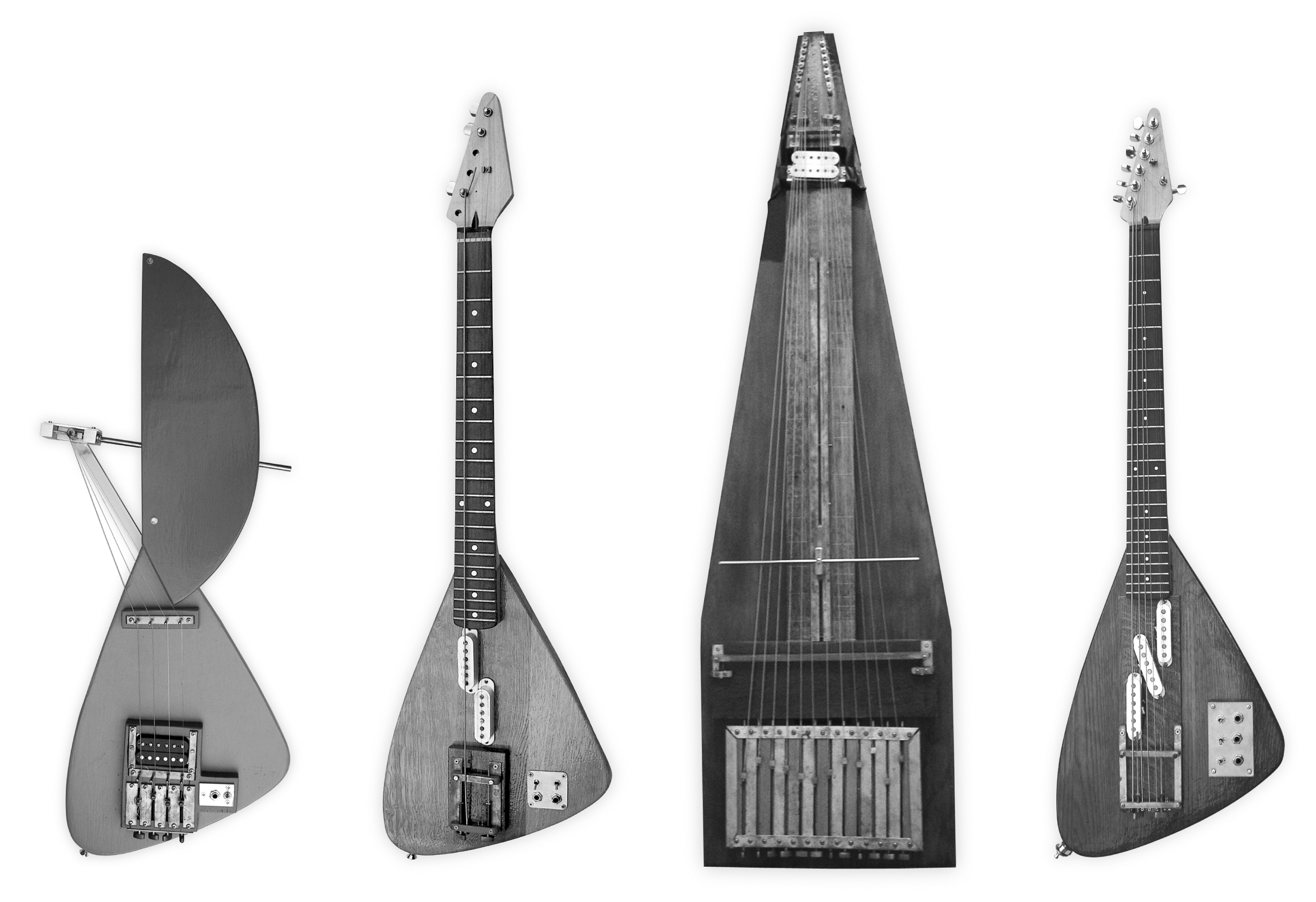
four early prototypes

In the period between 2000 and 2005, Landman created nine prototype instruments. In 2006 he changed his musical focus and stopped to perform and start building for other bands. The Moodswinger was the first instrument Landman made for the band Liars. After the Moodswinger, he started making more instruments for other bands as well.

From November 2006 to January 2007 Landman finished two copies of The Moonlander, a biheaded electric 18-string drone guitar, one for Sonic Youth guitarist Lee Ranaldo and one for himself.

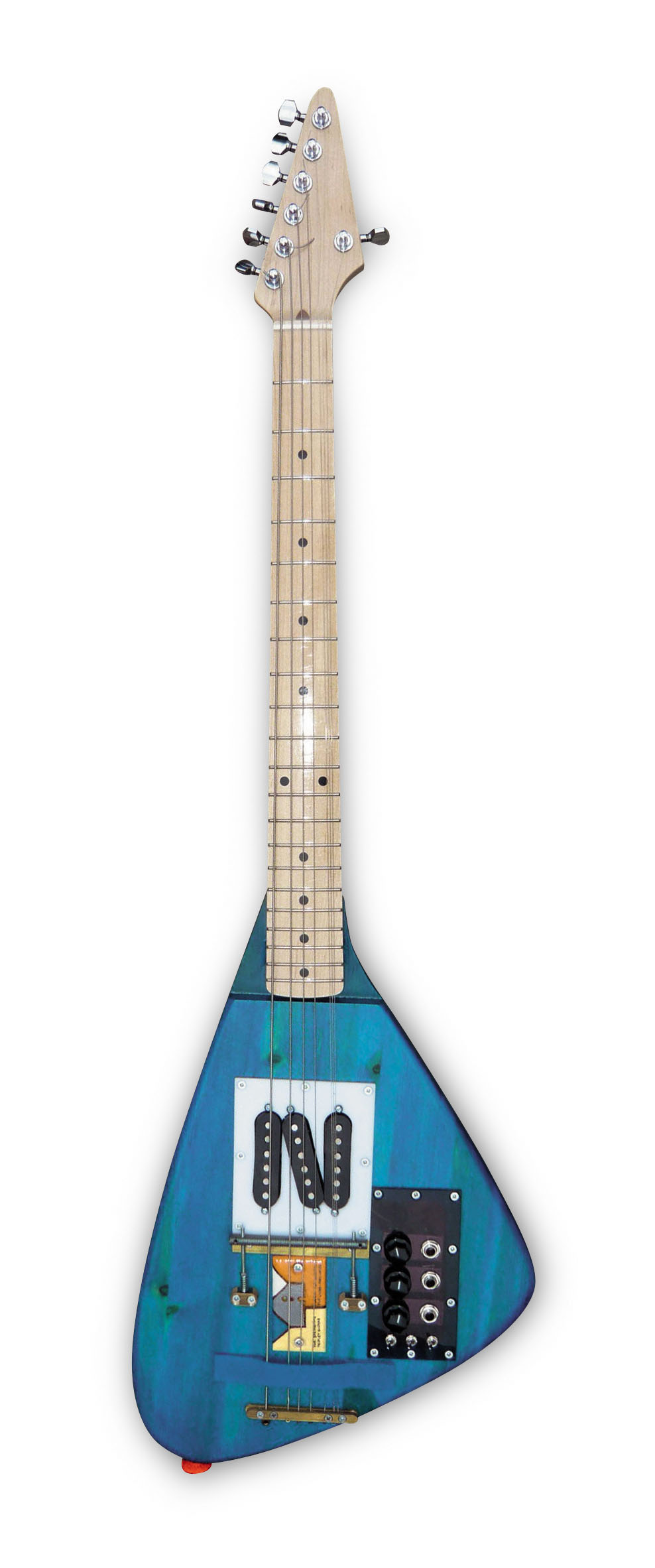
Springtime, 2008

The Springtime is an experimental electric guitar with seven strings and three outputs. The first prototype of this instrument, created in 2008, was made for guitar player Laura-Mary Carter of Blood Red Shoes. Afterwards he also made copies for Lou Barlow and dEUS' Mauro Pawlowski. For John Schmersal of Enon he built the Twister guitar, an alternate version of the Springtime. In 2009 he finished instruments for The Dodos, Liam Finn, HEALTH, Micachu and Finn Andrews of The Veils. For The Dodos and Finn he created electric 24 string drum guitars called the Tafelberg and for Andrews an electric 17-string harp guitar called the Burner guitar. He also started to perform again after a Perpignan Festival hosted by Vincent Moon and Gaspar Claus. Meanwhile, he continued to build instruments for artists such as These Are Powers, Women and Kate Nash. For his own musical career he develops a 25-meter electric long-string instrument, often featured at his performances.

Besides his output as an inventor and noise musician, he starts to focus on music education, and participatory art. At first Landman started giving musicological lectures at venues, festivals and music related educational institutes. Landman published the essay 3rd Bridge Helix - From Experimental Punk to Ancient Chinese Music & the Universal Physical Laws of Consonance in which he clarifies the relation between this prepared guitar technique and the consonant values present in non-Western scales, especially the musical scale used on the Ancient Chinese musical instrument the guqin. He published an extensive 8 chapter guide on how to prepare a guitar, that was later transformed to the book Nice Noise.

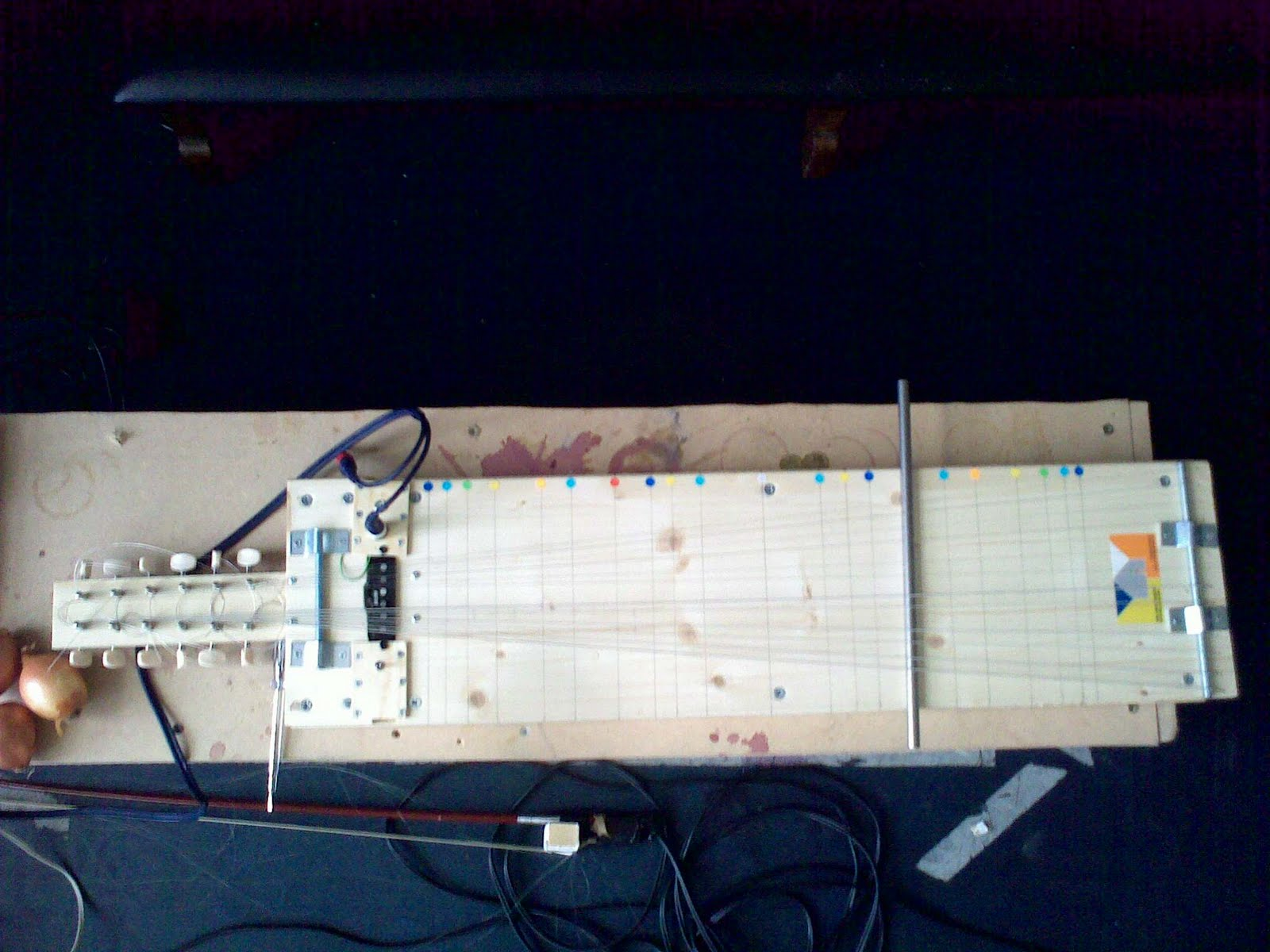
The Home Swinger

His lectures and presentations with his instruments prompted a request in 2009 for a practical building workshop. This gave rise to his Home Swinger project, which allowed people to participate in DIY workshops where they could build their own copy of his newly created instrument the Home Swinger. Often this was followed by a rehearsal and ensemble performance, with multiple copies of the Home Swinger, drums, basses, and guitars, in the style of the Rhys Chatham and Glenn Branca compositions. Events took place throughout all European countries and the US. The Home Swinger was selected as one of the instruments for the second Guthman Musical Instrument Competition at Georgia Tech, Atlanta, in February 2010. Along with the Moodswinger, this instrument is included in the permanent collection of the Musical Instrument Museum in Phoenix, Arizona. Soon after the start of the Home Swinger workshops his job as a teacher/artistbecame a full-time activity with an ongoing tour schedule throughout the whole year. He developed a wide of range of workshops with different kinds of instruments, and created this way thousands of DIY kalimbas, triochords, plates with crossed strings, and mallet guitars.

Due to the ongoing tour schedule with the DIY-instrument projects, he discontinued the production of his high-end products for bands, although he makes exceptions such as developing a 42-stringed instrument for Peter James Taylor; nine instruments for Belgian composer Serge Verstockt; instruments for befriended acts such as Lau Nau, Tomoko Sauvage, Hifi Club, Remko Scha, Ritornel, Katharine Klement, Killed by 9V Batteries and Ex-Easter Island Head; and an instrument for the SONS Museum in 2011. Because of his touring with the workshops he connects more to the experimental music scene, performing with acts such as Jad Fair, Rhys Chatham, Wu Fei, Noël Akchoté, Action Beat, Dustin Wong (ex Ponytail), Camera, and others.

In 2012, he published an album featuring Jad Fair and the French noise artist Philippe Petit. He also started a two-piece band called Bismuth with multi-instrumentalist Arnold van de Velde. In the same year he started his Strat Eraser Project and built a series of instruments for direct sale, along with the workshop exclusive models. In November he gave a TEDx talk. Around this time, he began to depart from building stringed instruments. Inspired by the percussive works of Lou Harrison, John Cage, and the Belgian sound artist George Smits, and the sounds of Indonesian Gamelan instruments, he created a collection of metal percussion instruments and amplified them with guitar pickups. These instruments are used on the recordings of Bismuth and in his live performances. Also, he built a set of motor instruments and invented an instrument made from PET bottles.

The March 2013 edition of Premier Guitar featured a cover story written by Landman about a guitar modification he did on request of the magazine. Later that year the documentary Alles, Tot Dit was published. In April 2014 Bismuth released their debut album. This album was published in a limited deluxe edition as well with a special designed instrument called 'Svikt' mounted to the album cover. In the same year he starts his solo performances and collaborates with the Dutch noise rock act Those Foreign Kids, functioning as his backing band on his European solo tours. Occasionally Landman performs together with Dutch sound artist Wessel Westerveld, who has built a collection of replicas of Luigi Russolos Intonarumori. Stichting De Stilte created a dance production with Landman playing live during the dance performances.

Since 2015, he has built a series of kinetic objects made with motors and pendulums that together operate as a sound installation. He exhibits this project in addition to his on stage performances. 2016 Premier Guitar approached him for the second time for a guitar building request, which resulted in an experimental guitar built for Thurston Moore. Similar to the first project the building process was published as an article in Premier Guitar and he did a 20-minute YouTube interview with Thurston when he handed over the guitar. In the same year he developed a DIY daxophone workshop. In May/June 2017 he was artist-in-residence for one month at iii in The Hague where he developed the motorized sound installation Helicopters. For Lee Ranaldos Lost Ideas Festival in Menen, Belgium he developed a harmonic guitar based on a predecessor, invented by Branca in the early 80s, Ranaldo played in Glenn Brancas orchestra. At the invitation of Harman Kardon he built a 24 string drone sonometer for J.Views during a documentary shoot in the spring of 2018. In October 2018 he published an 8-page musicological essay in Soundest #1 in which he states that the configuration of the musical keyboard is mathematically based, rather than a cultural evolutionairy phenomenon. He shows the pattern in several non-Western scales such as the Indian 22 shruti system, the 19-tone scales on the Iranian tar and the Turkish saz, an out-of-place Coptic artifact and his own tuning system applied on the Moodswinger. This explanation of the origin of the keyboard is in conflict with the Western consensus story that the pattern on the keyboard evolved culturally from originally seven white keys, adding one black key, followed by more into the twelve-tone Halberstadt Keyboard from 1361. In December that same year Musical Instrument Museum put on a large overview exhibition of his invented instruments. In 2019 he build a follow-up series of rhythmic helicopters as a part of Nora Mulder's '7090 Abstraction Parc' that was exhibited at Gaudeamus Music Week, Open NDSM and several other Dutch festivals.

During the Corona crisis his educational work and live performance stopped and he made a graphic novel after a hiatus of 20 years. In December 2020 he started prepublishing this book in six languages as a daily soap on his Instagram. It was published in a Dutch as well as an English edition in Spring 2021. In Feb '22 he pre-published 90 pages of his next graphic novel 'Dissident in '20-'21' in which he explains Mattias Desmet's mass formation theory.

=== Musical Theoretical Diagrams ===
The Moodswinger led to a research on harmonics theory. He published a clarifying 3rd bridge diagram related to this instrument in 2012 (and a more elaborate version of this diagram in 2017). In 2018 he published another microtonal diagram that compares the otonal and utonal scales with the harmonic series and 12TET and also how Partch' tonality diamond is related to the harmonic series when put in a triangular array.

=== Education ===
Landman co-wrote Nice Noise (about prepared guitar techniques and guitar modification) with Bart Hopkin. This book was released in 2012 by Experimental Musical Instruments and came along with 60 sound fragments made with a wide range of guitar preparations.

Around 2014 Landman started spreading out instrument collections among a growing group of non-profit organisations focused on education, sound art, electro-acoustic music, media art and avant garde music. Inspired by pioneering sound labs like the BBC Radiophonic Workshop, Philips' NatLab and Studio for Electronic Music (WDR) these collaborations create an infrastructure of sound labs within Europe for experimental artists and builders.

He is a regular guest teacher and lecturer at several academies and universities in Europe.

In 2020 Bloomsbury Publishing published the book ‘’Sound Art’’ by Holger Schulze and Sanne van Krogt. Landman wrote the chapter Pickups and Strings in this academic publication.

== Instruments ==
In the period 2000-2005 Landman created 9 prototype instruments.

- The black 4-string movable 3rd bridge zither.
- The red capozither, shown on the cover of Vivre dans l'aisance.
- Robocop, a 6 string heavily adjusted guitar with 2 additional bridges and 3 outputs.
- The 12 string overtone zither, the first prototype of Aaron Hemphill's Moodswinger.
- The blonde 3 string stereo-guitar, 1 bass string tuned B, and 2 thin B tuned guitar strings.
- The green 7 string trio-guitar, 1 bass string, DAD tuned guitar string and 3 G♯-strings.
- The Electric Spring
- The electric cymbalom, 72 strings, 12 pickups, one for each tone.
- The blue 4 string supertremolo-guitar, with no fretboard, but an adjustable pitch control for the left hand.

=== Instruments for artists (2006-2009) ===
- Moodswinger, built in 2006 for Aaron Hemphill of Liars
- Moonlander, built in 2007 for Lee Ranaldo of Sonic Youth
- Bachelor QS, built in 2007 for Jad Fair
- Springtime, built in 2008 for Laura-Mary of Blood Red Shoes
- Twister, built for John Schmersal of Enon
- Tafelberg for Liam Finn and The Dodos
- Desu for HEALTH
- Burner Bass for Pat Noecker of These Are Powers
- Burner Harp Guitar for The Veils and Javier Bayon

=== DIY Workshop instruments ===
- Home Swinger
- Quickstep electric kalimba
- Caterpillar Drum guitar
- White Eagle tailed bridge guitar
- Empire State Rocker
- Chorus monochord
- String Plates
- Amped Soda Pop Bottles
- Daxophone

=== For Bismuth and his solo performances ===
- Brooklyn Bridge, 24 string mini instrument
- Whopper, 3 string mini instrument
- Crotales, 2 disk circle saw blade crotales
- Hurdy Yuri
- Steel on Foam
- Landmine, a long string instrument
- Double Swinger, 24 string double Home Swinger
- Reshaped cymbals
- Railtrack Kalimba
- Brrr Kalimba
- Svikt Kalimba (for the deluxe edition of the Bismuth debut album)

== Bibliography ==
- Je Mag Alles Met Me Doen, 1997 (comic book in Dutch)
- Het Verdiende Loon, 1998 (graphic novel in Dutch)
- Nice Noise - Bart Hopkin & Yuri Landman. 72 pgs, Full Color, 2012, Experimental Musical Instruments, ISBN 978 0972 731 36 2
- 1991, 2021(graphic novel, full colour, 104 pgs, Dutch (Sherpa Books and English (Hypercustom Books) edition)

=== Contributions ===
- Sound Art - Holger Schulze & Sanne van Krogt, 2020, Bloomsbury Publishing, ISBN 9781501338809 Pickups and Strings, p460-470

=== Essays ===
- From Rusollo till Present , June 2019. An historic overview about the contemporary evolution of experimental musical instruments.

== Discography ==
- Zoppo - Chi pratica lo impare zoppicare (lp, Drowning Man Records, 1998)
- Zoppo - Nontonnen promo 7" (Blackbean & Placenta, 1998)
- Zoppo - Double the fun splitt 7" (Drowning Man Records, 1999)
- Zoppo - Belgian Style Pop (cd, Drowning Man/Transformed Dreams, 1999)
- Avec Aisance - Vivre dans l'aisance (cd, Drowning Man Records, 2004)
- Yuri Landman Ensemble featuring Jad Fair & Philippe Petit - That's Right, Go Cats (cd March 2012 Thick Syrup Records, lp May 2012 Siluh Records)
- Bismuth - s/t, LP, April 2014 Geertruida Records
- Schoolhouse - Soft Focus, 2014, cassette tape on Tombed Visions #11 w/ PJ Taylor, Harry Taylor (Action Beat) & Ben Duvall (Ex-Easter Island Head)
- Bismuth - I Said No Doctors! (2017, Dymaxion Groove) (Compilation album w/ several artists)

== Documentary ==
- Alles, Tot Dit, 20 min, 2013
