= Bart Hopkin =

Bart Hopkin (born 1952) is an American inventor and builder of experimental musical instruments and a writer and publisher on the subject. Hopkin runs the website www.barthopkin.com (previously windworld.com), which provides resources regarding unusual instruments.

Hopkin published the magazine Experimental Musical Instruments for 15 years and published several books and CDs specialized in a specialisation of certain types of instruments, such as wind chimes, plosive aerophones and marimbas. For these publications, Hopkin regularly asks experts on the subject to co-write the books, such as Carl Dean for the book about how to build and tune marimbas. Getting a Bigger Sound is a book Bart Hopkin wrote with Robert Cain and Jason Lollar about amplification of sound sources with several types of pickups ranging from piezo disc pickups to common pickups often used in electric guitars. Jason Lollar is a known builder of hand-wound electro-magnetic pickups.

Besides writing, he has also built several experimental musical instruments such as wooden saxophones, the Bell Tree, harmonic zithers, the Savart Wheel, the Trillium Harp, the Trillium Cluster, and many other instruments that are difficult to categorize.

In 2012, he published the book Nice Noise, about prepared guitar techniques written by Hopkin and experimental builder Yuri Landman. The book also features contributions by other builders such as Bradford Reed, Sam Dook (guitarist of The Go! Team), Fred Carlson, David Canwright, Dante Rosati and Neil Feather as well as info about John Schneiders microtonal guitars. The book was simultaneously released with 60 sound samples on bandcamp and SoundCloud.

Hopkin is based in San Anselmo, Marin County, in the San Francisco Bay Area of California.

== Publications ==
- Experimental Musical Instruments, magazine, 70 issues appeared as a printed publication between 1985 and 1999, later on re-issued as well on CD-ROM

=== Books ===
- Musical Instrument Design, 1996, See Sharp Press
- Gravikords, Whirlies and Pyrophones. Book & CD, Orange, Connecticut: Ellipsis Arts. #3530, 1998
- Making Musical Instruments with Kids, See Sharp Press
- Slap Tubes and other plosive Aerophones – Bart Hopkin and Philip Dadson, Experimental Musical Instruments
- Getting a Bigger Sound – Bart Hopkin with Robert Cain and Jason Lollar
- Making Marimbas and Other Bar Percussion Instruments – Bart Hopkin and Carl Dean with Christopher Banta
- Wind Chimes, Design and Construction, Experimental Musical Instruments
- Funny Noises for the Connoisseur, Book and audio CD – Bart Hopkin with Ray Brunelle and Vincent Nicastro
- Air Columns and Tone Holes: Principles for Wind, Experimental Musical Instruments
- Nice Noise – Bart Hopkin and Yuri Landman, 72 pgs, Full Color, 2012, Experimental Musical Instruments, ISBN 978 0972 731 36 2

=== CDs ===
- INSTUMENTARIUM HOPKINIS, Bart Hopkin Plays Invented Instruments, 2002
- AFTER SEVEN YEARS, Guitar Music from Bart Hopkin, 2003
- BOSSAS, BALLADS, AND BLUES, Dale Polissar, clarinet, and Bart Hopkin, guitar, 2004
- 21 WAYS OF LOOKING AT THINGS, Sound Instruments Designed by Bart Hopkin, 2007
- MELANGE, Dale Polissar, clarinet, and Bart Hopkin, guitar, 2009

== See also ==
- Harry Partch, American pioneer on experimental lutherie
- Nicolas Collins, another author with a focus on similar topics
