= Output Festival =

Dutch music festival

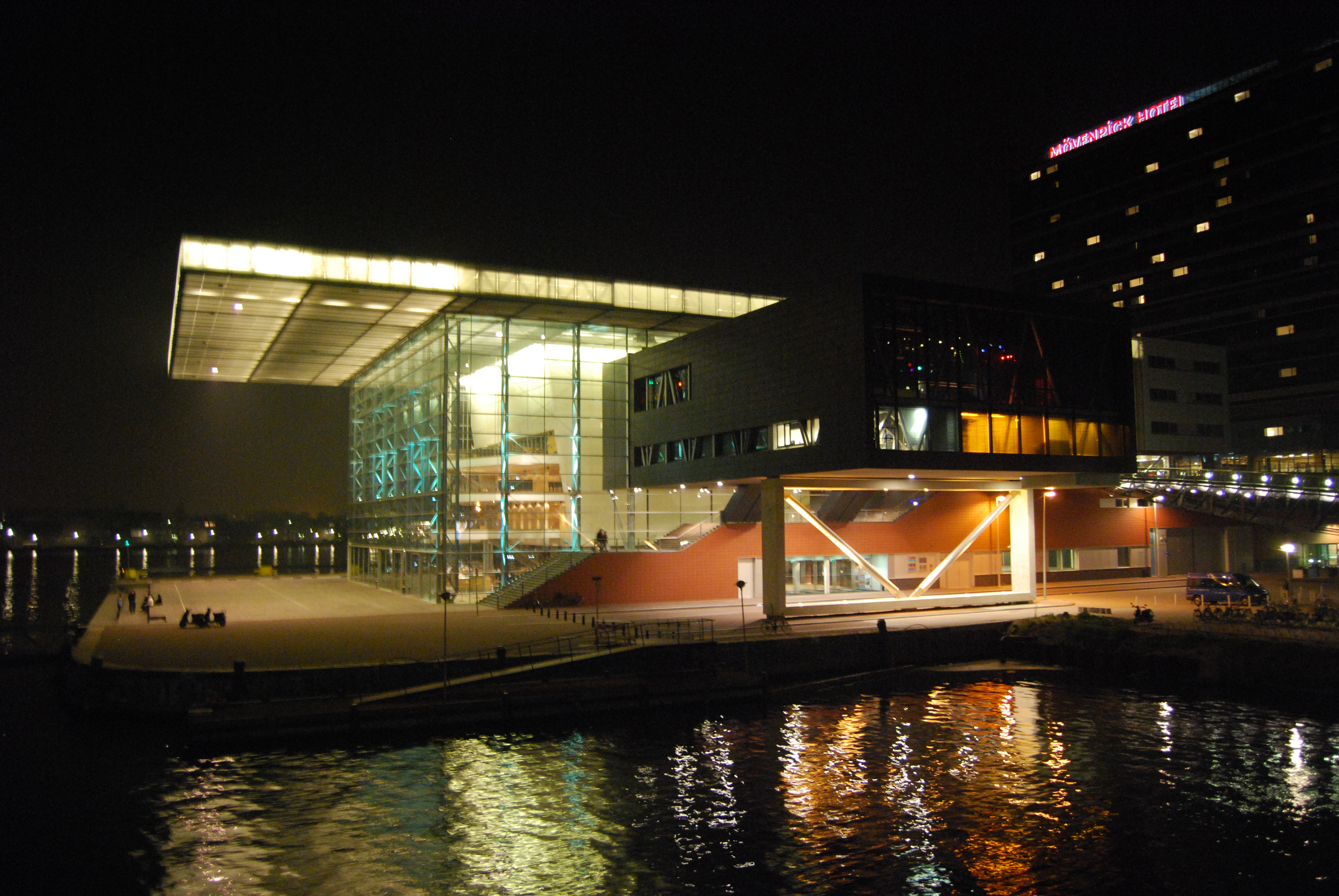
- Muziekgebouw aan 't IJ and the Bimhuis, Amsterdam
- Genre: Electronic music, experimental, contemporary electroacoustic music related to the electric guitar
- Dates: 2004-present
- Locations: Paradiso and De Balie in Amsterdam
- Website: www.outputfestival.com

The Output Festival is Dutch tri-annual music festival which focuses on experimental, contemporary electroacoustic music related to the electric guitar.

== Editions ==
=== First edition ===
The first edition was from Friday 8th until Sunday 10 October 2004, located in the Paradiso and De Balie in Amsterdam. The program consisted of performances by Scott Johnson, Christian Wolff, Peter Adriaansz and Christopher Fox, as well as new performances of the work of Theo Loevendie, Steve Reich, Per Nørgård, Giacinto Scelsi and Frank Martin.

==== Plug 'n Play ====
One part of the festival is Plug 'n Play. On 10 October, 60 guitarists played a piece by composer Gilius van Bergeijk directed by Otto Tausk.

==== Second edition ====
The second edition, with the subtitle soul of the tone, took place between the 28th and 30 September 2007. The locations are Bimhuis and Muziekgebouw aan 't IJ, both in Amsterdam.

Performances:

- The Wave of Chiel Meijering
- 150 amateur guitarists playing with Jan Akkerman
- An improvisation performance by Fred Frith
- A lecture by Yuri Landman

The second edition has NPS Radio 4 as its co-producer. The Festival is partnered by the Gaudeamus Foundation.

==== Third edition ====
The third edition released in 2010.

== See also ==
- List of electronic music festivals
