= Long-string instrument =

Experimental musical instrument

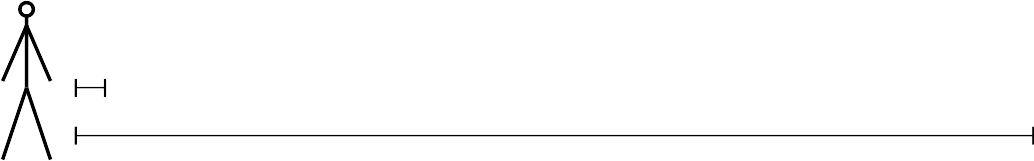
Stick figure of 1.75 meters standing next to a violin string of .33 meters and a long string instrument string of 10 meters.

The long-string instrument is a musical instrument in which the string is of such a length that the fundamental transverse wave is below what a person can hear as a tone (±20 Hz). If the tension and the length result in sounds with such a frequency, the tone becomes a beating frequency that ranges from a short reverb (approx 5–10 meters) to longer echo sounds (longer than 10 meters). Besides the beating frequency, the string also gives higher pitched natural overtones. Since the length is that long, this has an effect on the attack tone. The attack tone shoots through the string in a longitudinal wave and generates the typical science-fiction laser-gun sound as heard in Star Wars. The sound is also similar to that occurring in upper electricity cables for trains.

== History ==
A long string instrument was one of the techniques by which Mersenne tested Galileo's hypothesis, now known under Mersenne's name, by making string vibration speed visible and countable. For example if a string 0.33 meters long, of given mass and tension, produces A440, a string with identical mass and tension but eight times as long, 2.64 meters, produces 55 hertz.

One example of a long-string instrument was invented by the American composer Ellen Fullman. It is tuned in just intonation and played by walking along the length of its approximately 100 90-foot (27 m)-long strings and rubbing them with rosined hands and producing longitudinal vibrations. A C-clamp is used on each string for putting tension on the strings, much like a guitar capo, and a resonator is placed on the end the musician faces. This long-string instrument's range is centered on the octave of middle C and extends above and below this by an octave. The strings of the bass octave extend the instrument's full 90 feet.

Fullman is not the only person who has built long-string instruments. Alvin Lucier employed a monochord of up to 25 meters in his piece Music on a Long Thin Wire (1977). In 1981 Terry Fox also recorded two musical pieces called Berlin Attic Wire, Beating with a long string instrument. Since 1983, in addition to his work on and about the violin, Jon Rose has been bowing and recording the music of fences worldwide. Throughout his career Paul Panhuysen made many large sound installations with groups of long strings. George Smits built long string instruments acoustically amplified with styrofoam.

The experimental luthier and recording artist Yuri Landman built a portable electric long-string instrument. A three-minute solo that he recorded in a garden on this instrument can be heard on YouTube, uploaded in 2011.

Sound lab and research centre Sonoscopia in Porto, Portugal has a permanent electric amplified long-string instrument mounted to the wall in the hall of their building.

== See also ==
- Tromba marina
