= Experimental Musical Instruments =

American magazine (1985–1999)

Experimental Musical Instruments was a periodical edited and published by Bart Hopkin, an instrument builder and writer about 20th century experimental music design and custom made instrument construction. Though no longer in print, back issues are still available. The material and approach of EMI can now be found electronically on their site hosted by Bart Hopkin. This site is, together with www.oddmusic.com, the main source on the internet for experimental musical instrumentalism.

Although only old editions of the magazine are still available and no newer editions appear, the name is still in use as the publisher for many of the books written by Bart Hopkin and co-writers.

== Publications ==
- Experimental Musical Instruments, magazine, 70 issues appeared as a printed publication between 1985 and 1999, later on re-issued as well on CD-ROM. It was first headquartered in Nicasio, California, and then in Point Reyes Station, California.

=== Books ===
- Slap Tubes and other plosive Aerophones - Bart Hopkin and Phil Dadson, Experimental Musical Instruments
- Getting a Bigger Sound - Bart Hopkin with Robert Cain and Jason Lollar
- Making Marimbas and Other Bar Percussion Instruments - Bart Hopkin and Carl Dean with Christopher Banta
- Wind Chimes, Design and Construction, Experimental Musical Instruments
- Funny Noises for the Connoisseur, Book and audio CD - Bart Hopkin with Ray Brunelle and Vincent Nicastro
- Air Columns and Tone Holes: Principles for Wind, Experimental Musical Instruments
- Nice Noise - Bart Hopkin and Yuri Landman, 72 pgs, Full Color, 2012, Experimental Musical Instruments, ISBN 978 0972 731 36 2

=== CDs ===
- INSTUMENTARIUM HOPKINIS, Bart Hopkin Plays Invented Instruments, 2002
- 21 WAYS OF LOOKING AT THINGS, Sound Instruments Designed by Bart Hopkin, 2007
