= Killed by 9V Batteries =

Austrian rock band

- Origin: Austria
- Genres: Indie rock; noise rock; experimental rock; shoegaze
- Years active: 2002–2005, 2005–present
- Labels: Siluh; Universal
- Members: Wolfgang Möstl; Mario Zangl; Mario Loder; Philipp Ludersdorfer
- Past members: Stefan Christandl
- Website: killedby9vbatteries.com

Killed by 9V Batteries is an Austrian indie rock band.

== Biography ==
Founded in Graz in 2002, the members entered a temporary hiatus in 2005. However in the same year, they re-grouped and later signed to the Vienna-based indie label Siluh Records and released three full-length albums there.

Around 2015, the band went on a second hiatus and front singer Wolfgang Möstl worked out his solo act Mile Me Deaf to a three member band. This band is in sound similar to Killed by 9 Volt Batteries, though a bit less noisy. In Mile Me Deaf he is the lead singer and plays guitar and occasionally on a Home Swinger. In 2018 he scaled down this project to a solo act again with a more electronic output with samplers, drum computers and him on guitar and vocals. Möstl also plays guitar in the bands Sex Jams, and the sludge rockband Melt Downer. Möstl also plays guitar in the live band of Clara Luzia.

== Discography ==
- Rascals Kill Wild Wild Rascals (CD, Numavi, 2004)
- Rough (CD, Numavi, 2004)
- Powerchord Desaster (CD, Numavi, 2005)
- Ford Mustang (CD-Single, Numavi, 2005)
- Killed by 9V Batteries (CD, Siluh, 2006)
- Split 7" w/ "Jolly Goods" (7", Louisville/Siluh, 2008)
- Split Cassette w/ "Black Fox Dance" (MC, Wilhelm Show Me The Major Label, 2008)
- Escape Plans Make It Hard To Wait For Success (CD/LP, Siluh, 2008)
- Split LP w/ "Picture Eyes" (LP, Siluh/Numavi, 2009)
- The Crux (LP Siluh, 2011)

=== Albums ===
- Leave a Light on, 2008
- That's the crap we dance to, 2009
- Mile Me Deaf (1st Tape), 2009
- a blast from da past, 2012
- Eat Skull, 2012
- Holography, 2014
- Gold Kid (16 Minute Version), 2014
- Singlestringer, 2014
- Eerie Bits of Future Trips, 2015, album
- The Run, 2016
- Alien Age, 2017

=== EPs and Singles ===
- Sisters of Marcy D'arcy, 2009 EP
- Brando EP, 2013
- Shiver, 2014 single
- Out Of Breath At Ego Death wolf/beat Remix, 2014 single
- All That She Wants (Ace Of Base Cover), Single, 2013
- Bologna English Type / Creepy Lounge Version (Wanda Cover), 2015, single
- Light Ltd. EP, 2015
- She's quite alright, 2015 single
- Dig Deep, 2016 single
- Blowout / Wayout 7", 2016
- Alien Age (Fazo Jellinek Remix), single
- Voyage, 2017 single
- Light Ltd., 2017 single
