= Monochord =

Ancient musical and scientific laboratory instrument

A string, tied at A, is kept in tension by W, a suspended weight, and two bridges, B and the movable bridge C, while D is a freely moving wheel, density may be tested by using different strings

A monochord, also known as sonometer (see below), is an ancient musical and scientific laboratory instrument, involving one (mono-) string (chord). The term monochord is sometimes used as the class-name for any musical stringed instrument having only one string and a stick shaped body, also known as musical bows. According to the Hornbostel–Sachs system, string bows are bar zithers (311.1) while monochords are traditionally board zithers (314). The "harmonical canon", or monochord is, at its least, "merely a string having a board under it of exactly the same length, upon which may be delineated the points at which the string must be stopped to give certain notes," allowing comparison.

A string is fixed at both ends and stretched over a sound box. One or more movable bridges are then manipulated to demonstrate mathematical relationships among the frequencies produced. "With its single string, movable bridge and graduated rule, the monochord (kanōn [Greek: law]) straddled the gap between notes and numbers, intervals and ratios, sense-perception and mathematical reason." However, "music, mathematics, and astronomy were [also] inexorably linked in the monochord." As a pedagogical tool for demonstrating mathematical relationships between intervals, the monochord remained in use throughout the Middle Ages.

== Experimental use ==
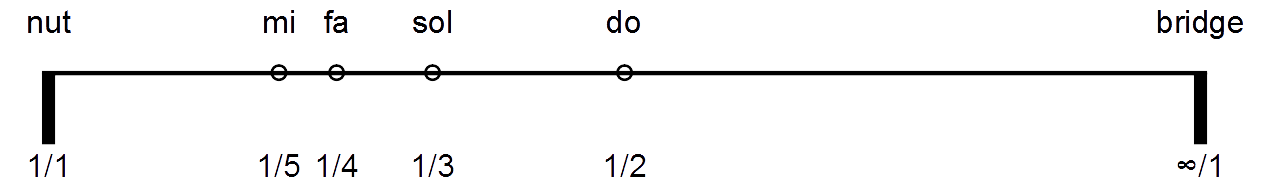
1/1, 5/4, 4/3, 3/2, and 2/1 (in C: C, E, F, G, C')

The monochord can be used to illustrate the mathematical properties of musical pitch and to illustrate Mersenne's laws regarding string length and tension: "essentially a tool for measuring musical intervals". For example, when a monochord's string is open it vibrates at a particular frequency and produces a pitch. When the length of the string is halved, and plucked, it produces a pitch an octave higher and the string vibrates at twice the frequency of the original (2:1). Half of this length will produce a pitch two octaves higher than the original—four times the initial frequency (4:1)—and so on. Standard diatonic Pythagorean tuning (Ptolemy's Diatonic Ditonic) is easily derived starting from superparticular ratios, (n+1)/n, constructed from the first four counting numbers, the tetractys, measured out on a monochord. The mathematics involved include the multiplication table, least common multiples, and prime and composite numbers.

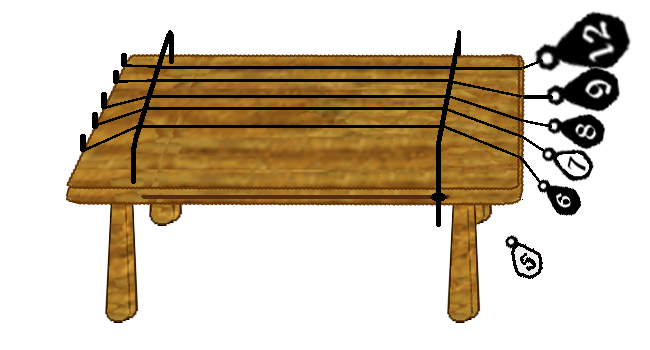
Several monochords, sharing a single resonator table

"As the name implies, only one string is needed to do the experiments; but, since ancient times, several strings were used, all tuned in exact unison, each with a moveable bridge, so that various intervals can be compared to each other [consonance and dissonance]." A "bichord instrument" is one, "having two strings in unison for each note [a course]," such as the mandolin. With two strings one can easily demonstrate how various musical intervals sound. Both open strings are tuned to the same pitch, and then the movable bridge is put in a mathematical position on the second string to demonstrate, for instance, the major third (at 4/5th of the string length) or the minor third (at 5/6th of the string length).

Many contemporary composers focused on microtonality and just intonation such as Harry Partch, Ivor Darreg, Tony Conrad, Glenn Branca, Bart Hopkin, and Yuri Landman constructed multistring variants of sonometers with movable bridges.

== Instruments ==
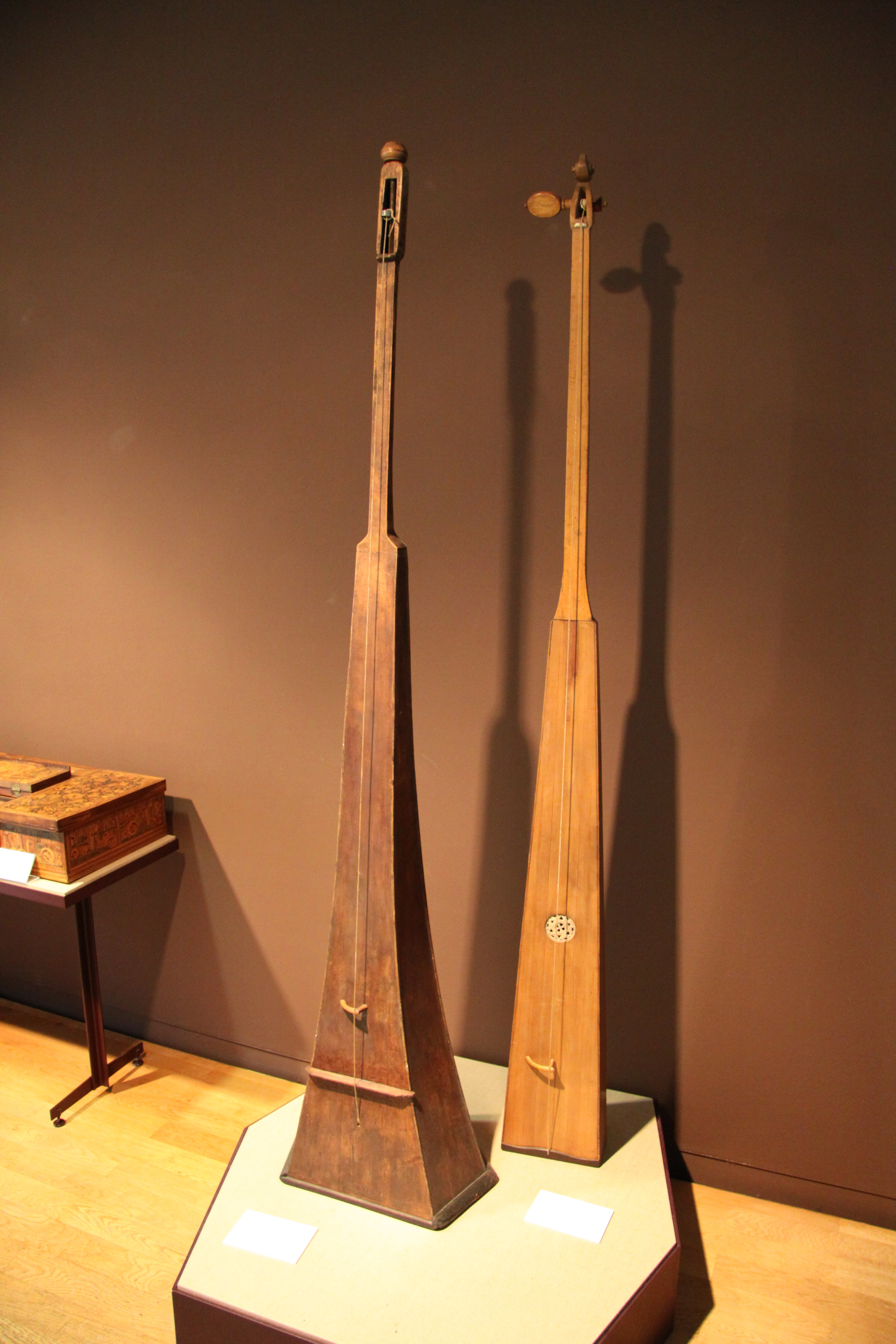
Two monochord instruments (marine trumpets) on display

Parts of a monochord include a tuning peg, nut, string, moveable bridge, fixed bridge, calibration marks, belly or resonating box, and an end pin.

Instruments derived from the monochord (or its moveable bridge) include the guqin, dan bau, koto, vina, hurdy-gurdy, and clavichord ("hence all keyboard instruments"). A monopipe is the wind instrument version of a monochord; a variable open pipe which can produce variable pitches, a sliding cylinder with the numbers of the monochord marked. End correction must be used with this method, to achieve accuracy.

== Monochord practitioners ==
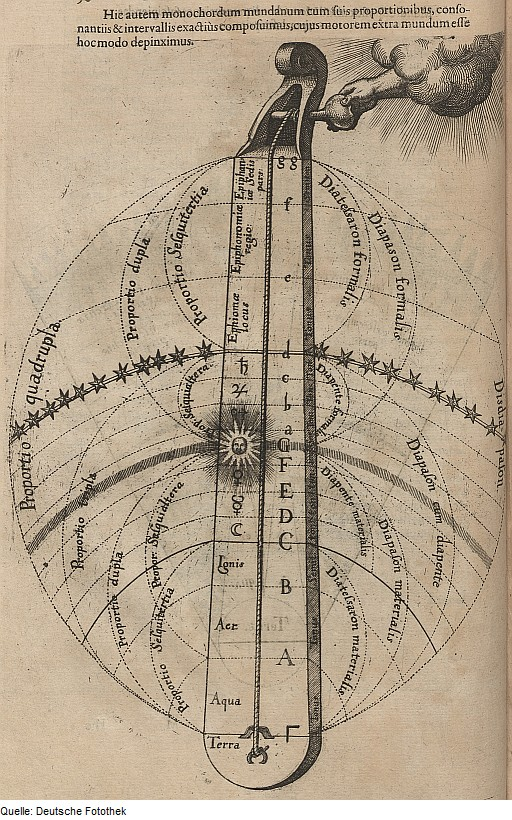
(1617)

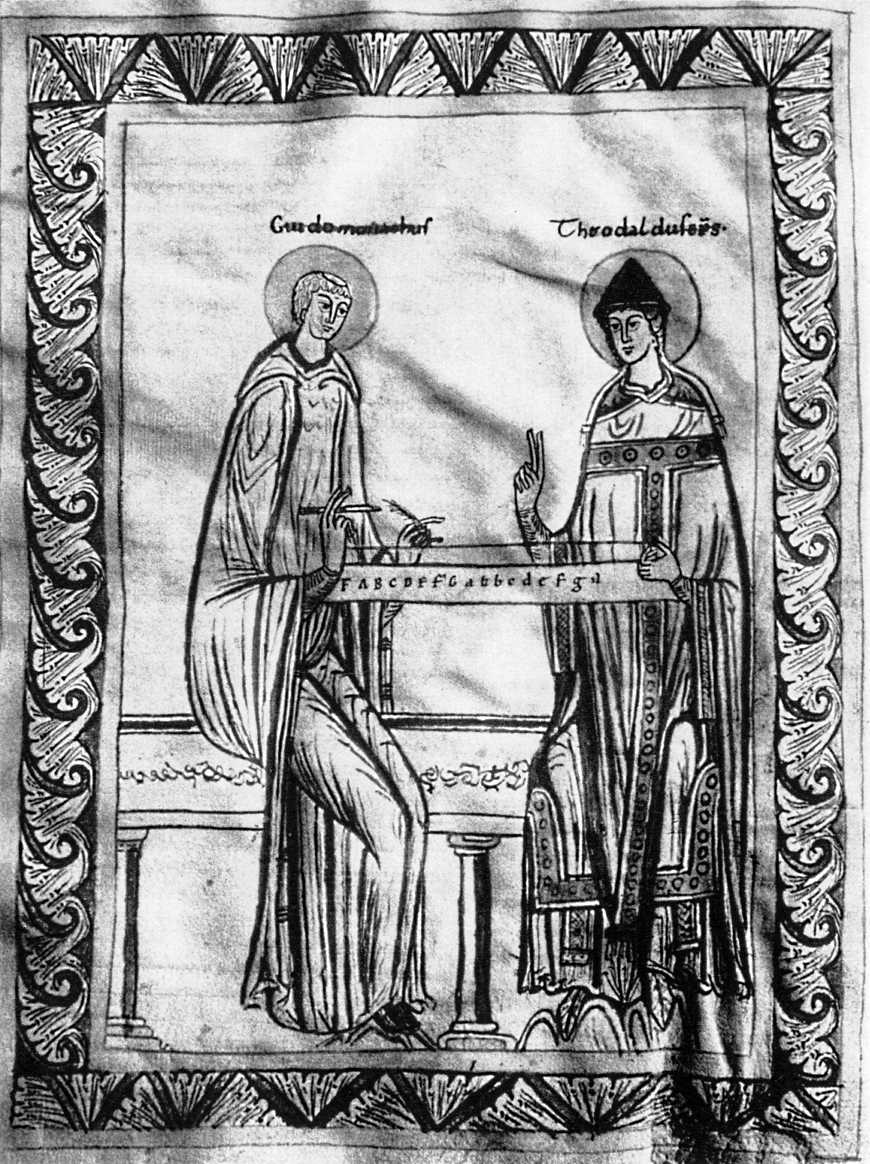
Guido d'Arezzo studying the monochord with Bishop Theodald.

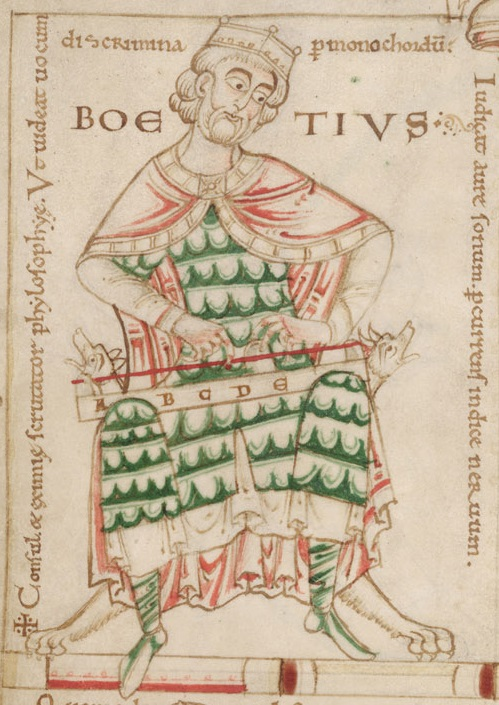
Medieval drawing of the philosopher Boethius

The monochord is mentioned in Sumerian writings, and, according to some, was reinvented by Pythagoras (sixth century BC). Dolge attributes the invention of the moveable bridge to Guido of Arezzo around 1000 AD.

In 1618, Robert Fludd devised a mundane monochord (also celestial or divine monochord) that linked the Ptolemaic universe to musical intervals. "Was it [Mersenne's discoveries through use of the monochord (1637)] physical intuition or a Pythagorean confidence in the importance of small whole numbers? ... It was the latter."

The psalmodicon, a similar instrument but with a chromatic fret board replacing the moveable bridge, was developed in Denmark in the 1820s and became widespread throughout Scandinavia in churches as an alternative to the organ. Scandinavian immigrants also brought it to the United States. It became quite rare by the latter 20th century, but more recently has been revived by folk musicians.

An image of the celestial monochord was used on the 1952 cover of Anthology of American Folk Music by Harry Everett Smith and in the 1977 book The Cosmographical Glass: Renaissance Diagrams of the Universe (p. 133) by S. K. Heninger Jr., ISBN 978-0-87328-208-6. A reproduction of the monochordum mundanum (mundane monochord) illustration from page 90 of Robert Fludd's "Utriusque Cosmi, Maioris scilicet et Minoris, Metaphysica, Physica, Atque Technica Historia" ("Tomus Primus"), 1617, was used as the cover art for Kepler Quartet's 2011 audio CD, Ben Johnston: String Quartets Nos. 1, 5 & 10 (New World Records Cat. No. 80693), which is classical music that uses pitch ratios extended to higher partials beyond the standard Pythagorean tuning system.

A modern playing technique used in experimental rock as well as contemporary classical music is 3rd bridge. This technique shares the same mechanism as used on the monochord, by dividing the string into two sections with an additional bridge.

== Sonometer ==
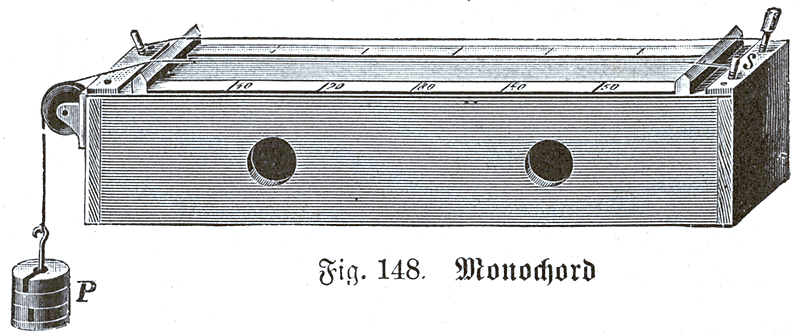
Monochord

A sonometer is a diagnostic instrument used to measure the tension, frequency or density of vibrations. They are used in medical settings to test both hearing and bone density. A sonometer, or audiometer, is used to determine hearing sensitivity, while a clinical bone sonometer measures bone density to help determine such conditions as the risk of osteoporosis.

In audiology, the device is used to test for hearing loss and other disorders of the ear. The audiometer measures the ability to hear sounds at frequencies normally detectable by the human ear. Several test are usually conducted using the audiometer which will then be used to assess hearing ability. Results typically are recorded on a chart known as an audiogram.

A clinical bone sonometer is a device which tests for the risk of bone fractures associated with osteoporosis. This test, called an ultrasound bone densitometry screening, is not typically used for diagnostic purposes; it is generally used as a risk assessment tool. Testing is often recommended for those whose personal history indicates a possible high risk for osteoporosis. Testing is usually conducted by an orthopedist, rheumatologist or neurologist specializing in the treatment of osteoporosis. The patient simply places his or her heel in the sonometer, and it is then scanned using ultrasound to determine bone density. This is a fast and low-cost procedure generally lasting 30 seconds or less. Results typically are available immediately following the procedure. Two score results are possible: a T-score, which compares a patient's scan against that of a young person of the same gender; and a Z-score, which compares the scan against someone of similar age, weight and gender. The T-scores results are used to assess the risk of osteoporosis. A score above -1 indicates a low risk for osteoporosis; below -1 to -2.5 indicates a risk of developing osteoporosis; and a score below -2.5 indicates more intensive testing should be performed and that osteoporosis is likely present. The Z-score reports how much bone the patient has as compared to others his age. If this number is high or low, further testing may be ordered.

== See also ==
- "Monochord" . Encyclopædia Britannica. Vol. 18 (11th ed.). 1911.
- Beat (acoustics)
- Harmonic Canon
- Long-string instrument
