= Springtime (guitar) =

Experimental electric guitar created by Yuri Landman

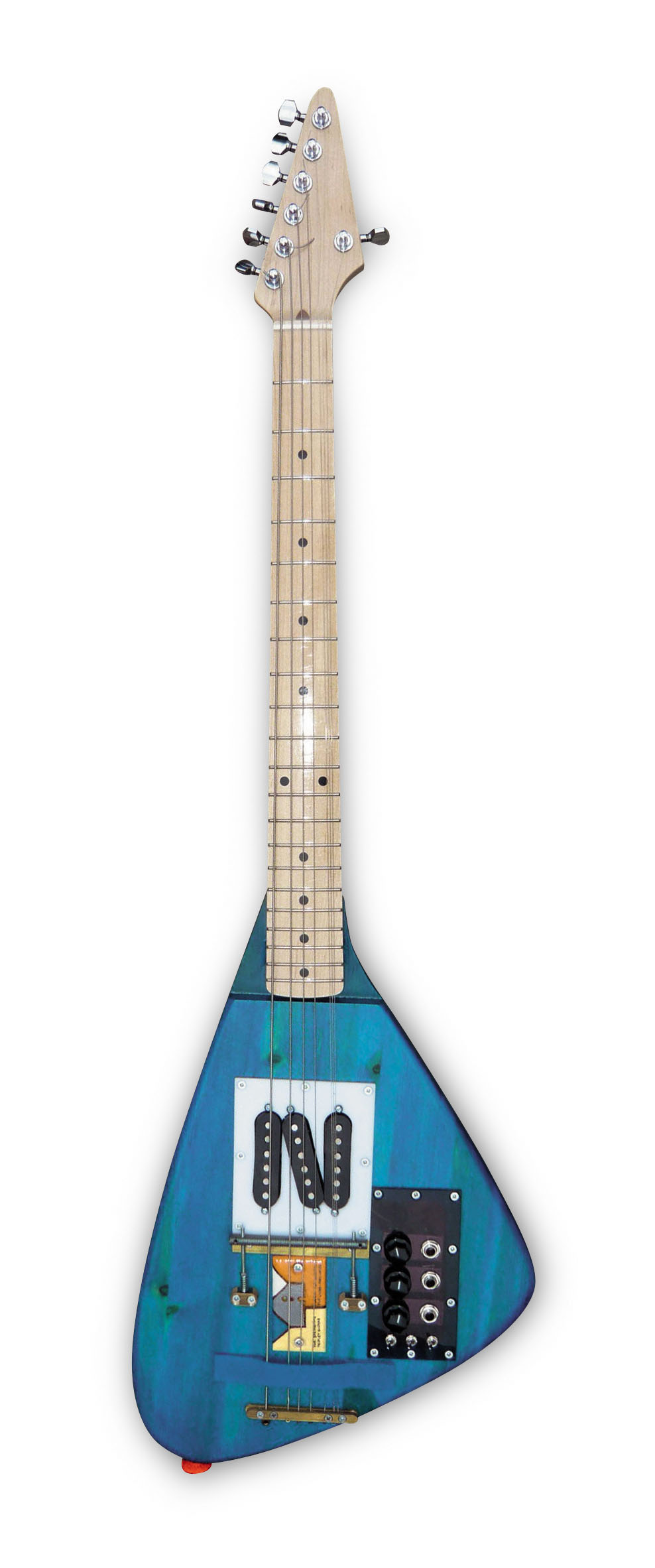
Springtime, Yuri Landman, 2008

The Springtime is an experimental electric guitar with seven strings and three outputs. The instrument was created in 2008 by Dutch luthier Yuri Landman for guitar player Laura-Mary Carter of Blood Red Shoes.

== Technical information ==
The string set up of the guitar is 1 bass string, 3 wound guitar strings for the chords and a cluster of 3 unwound strings tuned off-key unison, causing a rapid vibrating tone. Each group of strings has its own individual output for three amplifiers to preserve tonal interference. The sound simulates three musicians at once; a bass player, a rhythm guitarist and a solo guitarist or a Greek electric bouzouki. The instrument also is fitted with a so-called tailed bridge (as on a Fender Jaguar) to increase overtone possibilities. The electronics contain switches to change the 3-way system to stereo or mono if fewer amplifiers are available.

Landman handed over his prototype to Carter before their sold out gig on May 19, 2008 in the venue Doornroosje in Nijmegen, Holland.

This is the first guitar created by Landman which is put in serial production. The reproductions have a red or blank body.

== Springtime II ==
A few months after the first Springtime, Landman built the Springtime II on specifications made up by Lou Barlow. Barlow's version has eight tuning pegs, two of them unused, but available for an alternative seven or eight string set up. The other six employ the strings for the instruments in four positions similar to a bass guitar, but the upper two positions are double coursed strings. Because of this the instrument remains a six string guitar. Also the pickup configuration is different and four single coils are present instead of three. The lowest positioned pickup is left out and a regular bridge and neck pickup are placed aside of the rotated pickup duo. The velcro tape to mute undesired string resonance from the tailed bridge is also not present on this version.

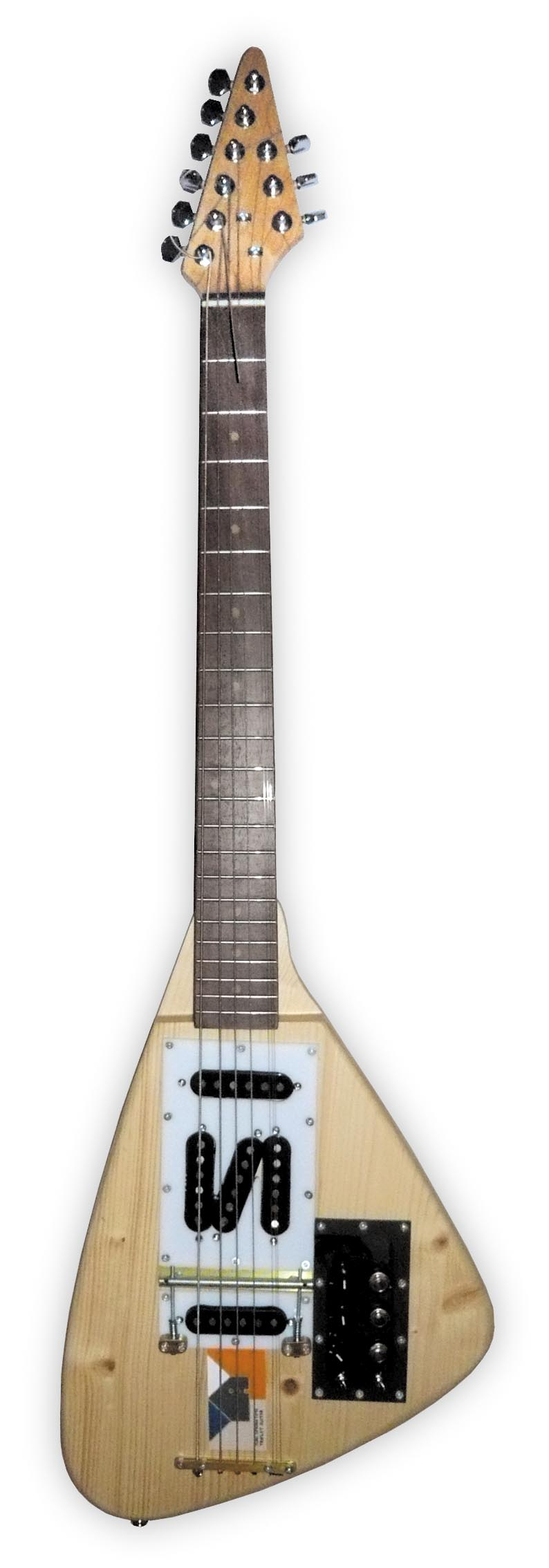
Mauro's Springtime with 5 pickups instead of 3

Also other alternate versions of the Springtime exist. For Mauro Pawlowski of dEUS Landman made an alternate version with nine tuning pegs and an additional pick up in the tail to explore the possibilities of creating third bridge sounds. This pick up has a separate output. Also a fifth pick up was added, similar to the bridge pick up present at Barlow's version. Also a red version for Meric Long of The Dodos is made with an alternate pickup and string configuration.

A red Springtime was used by Placebo frontman Brian Molko in 2008, while he was in the studio for recording Battle for the Sun. On the Battle for the Sun bonus DVD, Molko is seen experimenting with the Springtime and discussing its possible uses with producer David Bottrill.

== Sources ==
=== Additional Dutch sources ===
- Article on myownmusicindustry.nl
- Article on The Dutch Rock & Pop Institute website
- Article on VPRO's 3VOOR12 website
