= Moodswinger =

Twelve-string electric zither

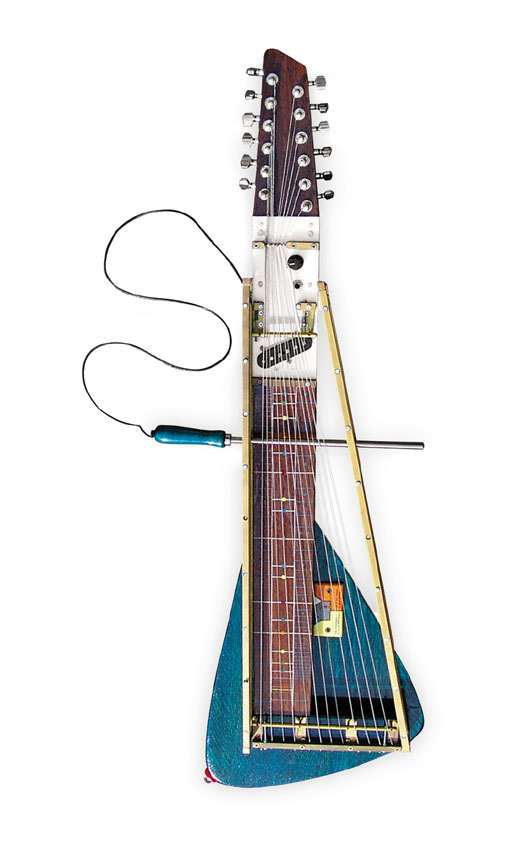
In 2006 luthier Yuri Landman built the Moodswinger, a 12 string overtone zither.

The Moodswinger is a twelve-string electric zither with an additional third bridge designed by Yuri Landman. The rod which functions as the third bridge divides the strings into two sections to cause an overtone multiphonic sound. One of the copies of the instrument is part of the collection of the Musical Instrument Museum in Phoenix, Arizona.

== History ==
In March 2006 Landman was contacted by the noise band Liars to make an instrument for them. After 6 months he finished two copies of The Moodswinger, an electric 12-string 3rd-bridge overtone koto, one for guitarist/drummer Aaron Hemphill and one for himself. Although it closely resembles an electric guitar, it is actually a zither, as it has neither frets nor a proper neck. The pickup and electronics are built into the neck instead of in the body unlike usual electric guitars. In 2008 the Moodswinger II was released as a serial product. Jessie Stein of The Luyas owns a copy.

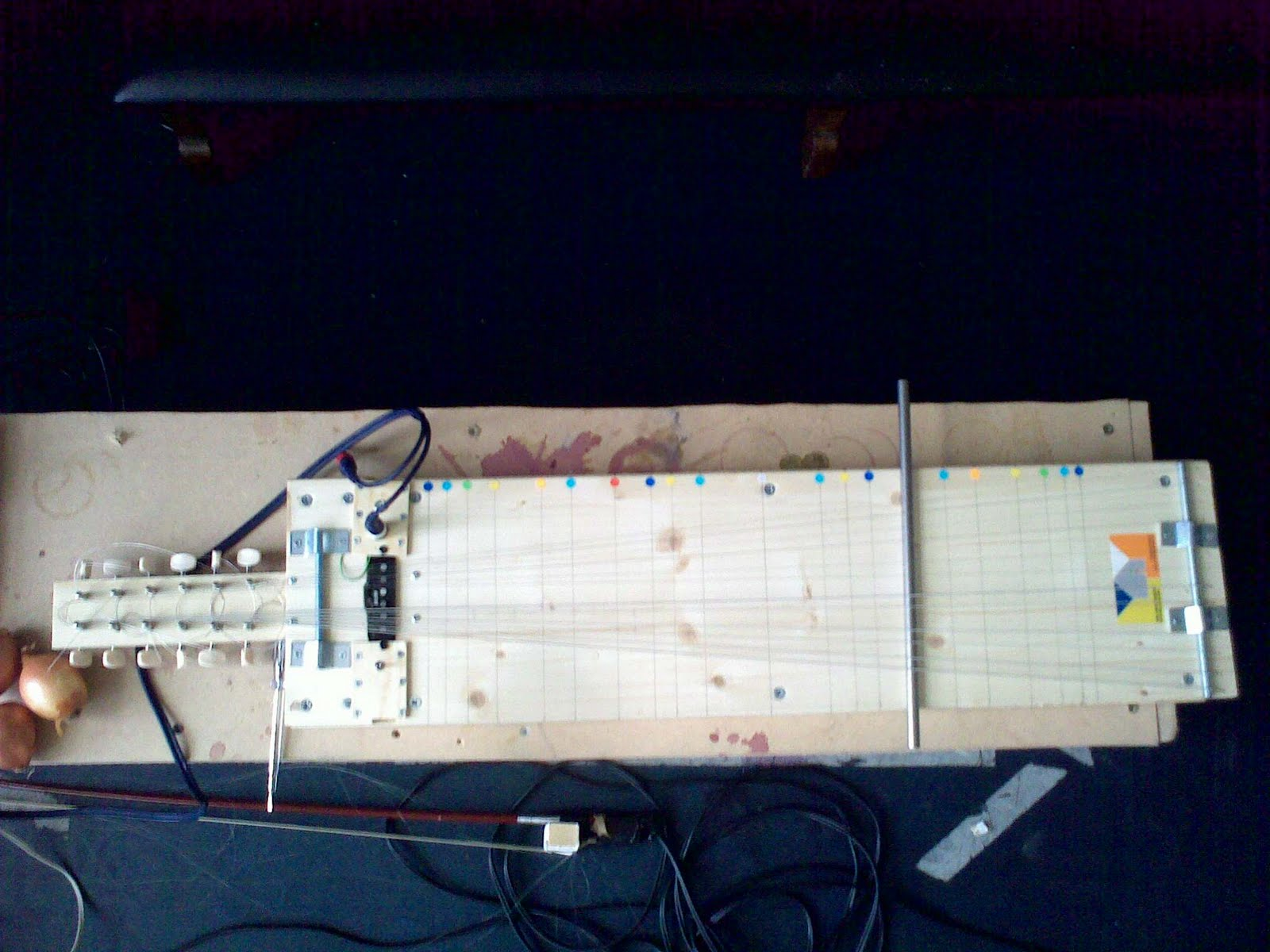
A Home Swinger

In 2009 Landman created a derivative version of the instrument called the Home Swinger, for workshops at festivals, where participants built their own copy within four hours. In 2010 the Musical Instrument Museum in Phoenix included a Moodswinger as well as a Home Swinger in their collection as two of the pieces of the Dutch section of musical instrument inventions.

== Physical background ==
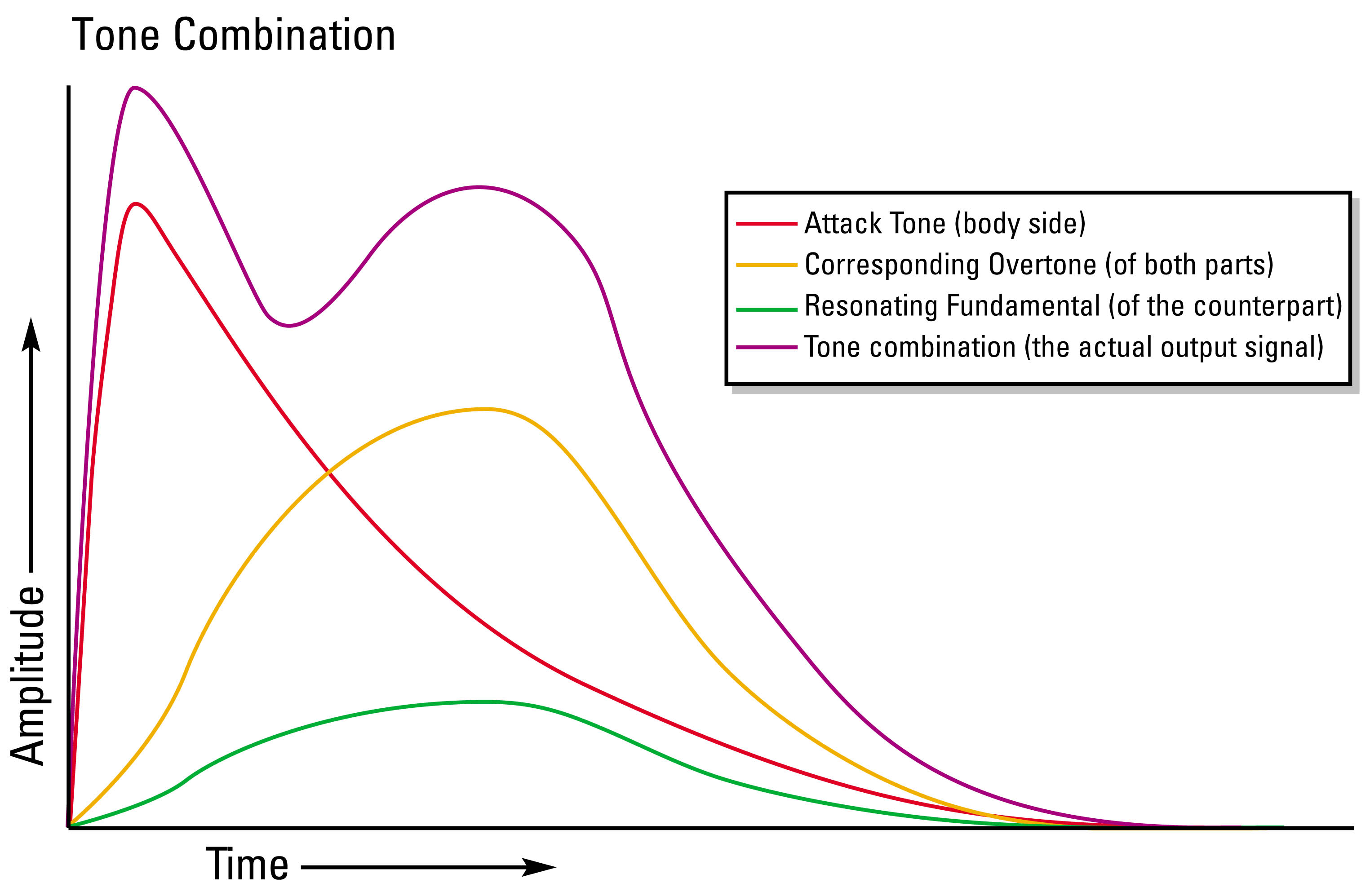
Tone combination

The 3rd bridge divides the strings into two segments with different pitches. Depending on where the string is played, a bell-like harmonic second tone is created. The string resonates more or less when the back side is struck, depending on the position of the 3rd bridge along the string. This can be explained by acoustic resonance and microtonality. At harmonic nodal positions, the string resonates more than at other positions. For instance, dividing the string 1/3 + 2/3 creates a clear overtone, while 24/33 + 9/33 creates an indistinct overtone. The color dotted scale indicates the simple-number ratios up to the 7 limit (on the Moodswinger II to the 8 limit.) On these positions just intoned harmonic dyads occur.

== Tuning and scales ==
The Moodswinger is focused on a non-atonal playing technique. A mathematical scale is added to specify 23 harmonic positions on the strings. Because the instrument has 12 strings, tuned in a circle of fourths, it is always possible to play every note of the equal tempered scale. However some positions have a + or - indication, because the equal tempered scale is not a perfect well-tempered scale.

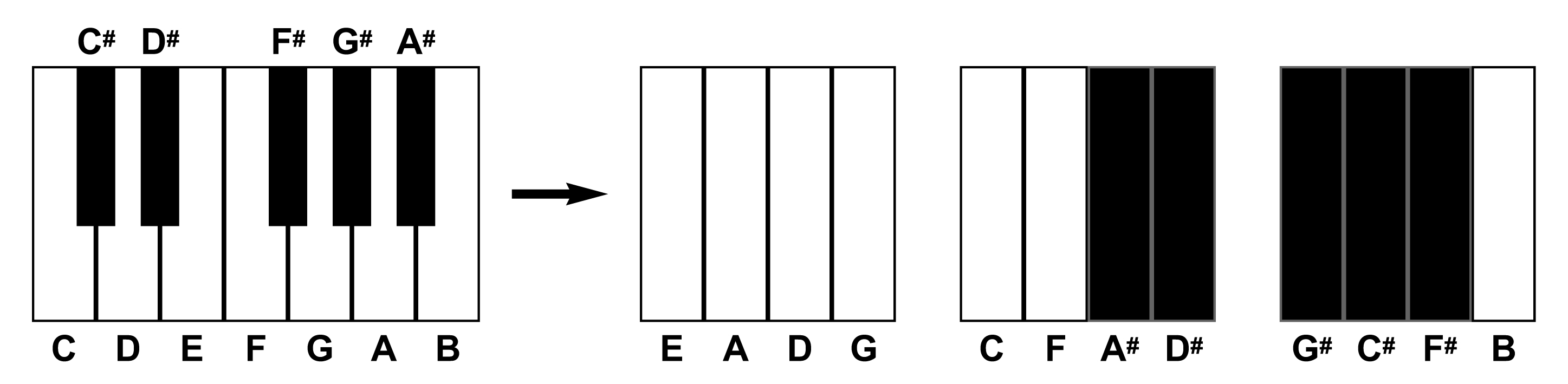
Piano keys translated to Moodswinger tuning

The tuning of this instrument is a circle of fourths: E-A-D-G-C-F-A#-D#-G#-C#-F#-B, arranged in 3 clusters of 4 strings each to make the field of strings better readable.

Because of this tuning all five neighbouring strings form a harmonic pentatonic scale and all seven neighbouring strings form a major scale, available in every key. This allows a very easy fingerpicking technique without picking false notes, if the right key is chosen.

Moodswinger scale, based on overtone positions

The instrument has 3 printed scales, used as guides for positioning the moveable third bridge and reading the played notes:

- The normal guitar (equal-tempered) scale
- An inverse scale (large steps between the frets at the top of the neck, small ones at the body bridge)
- A microtonal scale which shows "logical" string divisions in the following color-coded groups:
  - Grey dot: 1/2
  - Red dot: 1/3+2/3
  - Orange dot: 1/4+3/4
  - Yellow dot: 1/5-4/5
  - Green dot: 1/6+5/6
  - Cyan dot: 1/7-6/7
  - And a smaller subscale for the higher-pitched overtones near the body bridge in colored lines:
    - Grey line: 1/8
    - Red line: 1/9
    - Orange line: 1/10
    - Yellow line: 1/11
    - Green line: 1/12
    - Blue line: 1/16

On the Moodswinger II the 1/8, 3/8, 5/8 and 7/8 are Blue dotted. On the Home Swinger the same color system occurs.

=== Moodswinger overtone diagram ===
The sound of a 3rd-bridged string is a combination of 3 tones. A soft-sounding attack tone of the string part hit at the body side, the corresponding overtone of both sides and a resonating low fundamental tone of the counterpart of the string at the head side. The diagram below shows the tone combinations of the overtone (above) and the low tone of the counterpart (below). The attack tone is in most positions exact the same note as the overtone. Exceptions are 3/4, 3/5, 3/7 and 5/7. In the 3/... positions the overtone is a perfect fifth of the attack tone, in the 5/7 positions the overtone is a major third of the attack tone.

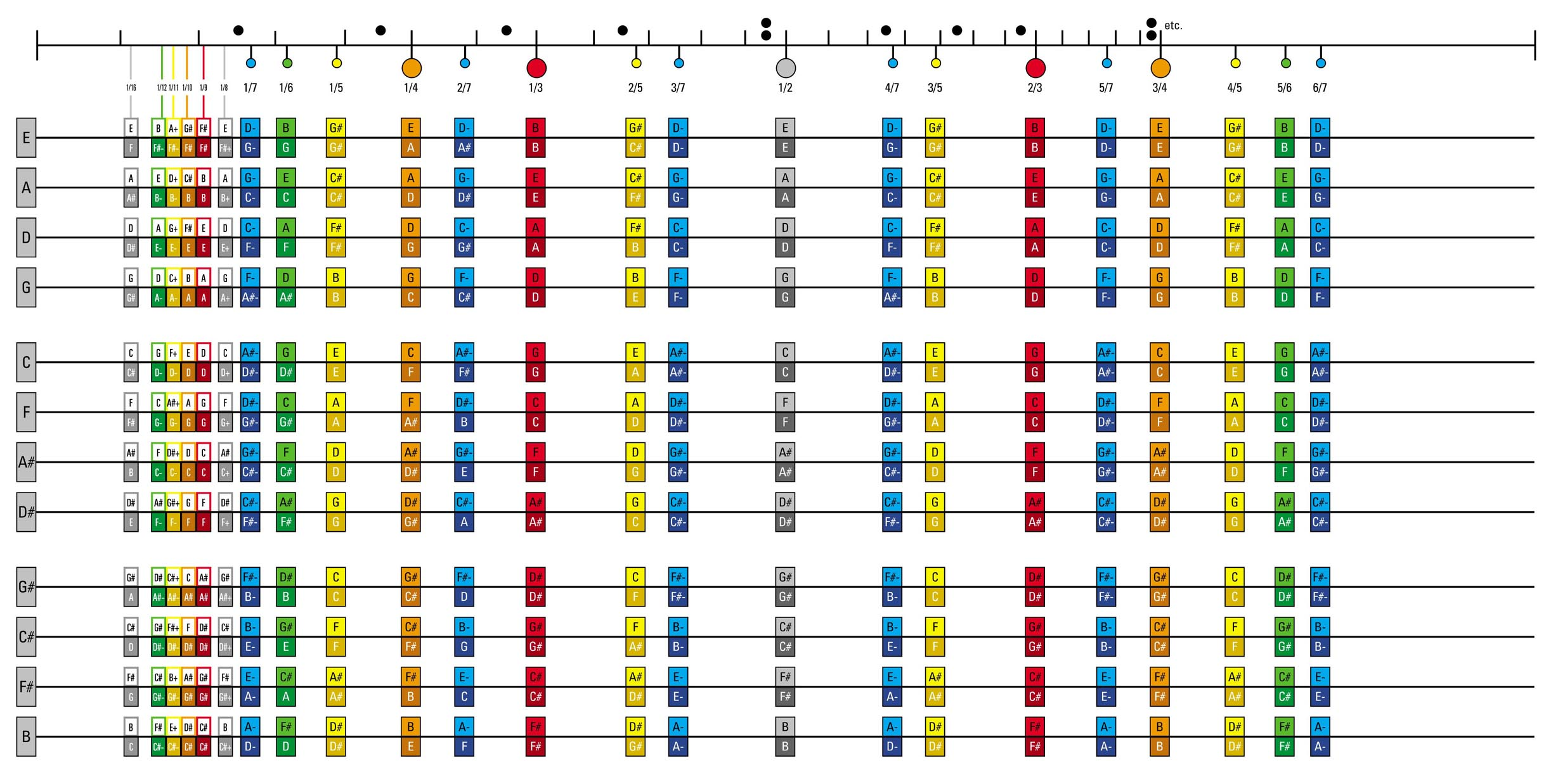
Moodswinger overtone diagram, click for full-size image

Bridge position	Colour codes	Attack tone : open string	Resonating fundamental of the counterpart: open string	Corresponding overtone related : open string	Corresponding overtone : fundamental of the counterpart	Cents of string parts Body : Neck
0		Unison	Unison			
1/16	Grey line	4 octaves	Just minor second (16:15)	4 octaves	Just major seventh (15:8) 22ma	111.73 : 4800.00
1/12	Green line	Just perfect fifth (3:2) 22ma	Lesser undecimal neutral second (12:11)	Just perfect fifth (3:2) 22ma	Lesser undecimal tritone (11:8) 22ma	150.64 : 4302.00
1/11	Yellow line	Lesser undecimal tritone (11:8) 22ma	Greater undecimal neutral second (11:10)	Lesser undecimal tritone (11:8) 22ma	Just major third (5:4) 22ma	165.00 : 4151.30
1/10	Orange line	Just major third (5:4) 22ma	Lesser just major second (10:9)	Just major third (5:4) 22ma	Greater just major second (9:8) 22ma	182.40 : 3986.30
1/9	Red line	Greater just major second (9:8) 22ma	Greater just major second (9:8)	Greater just major second (9:8) 22ma	3 octaves	203.91 : 3803.90
1/8	Grey line	3 octaves	Septimal major second (8:7)	3 octaves	Harmonic seventh (7:4) 15ma	231.17 : 3600.00
1/7	Blue dot	Harmonic seventh (7:4) 15ma	Septimal minor third (7:6)	Harmonic seventh (7:4) 15ma	Just perfect fifth (3:2) 15ma	266.87 : 3368.80
1/6	Green dot	Just perfect fifth (3:2) 15ma	Just minor third (6:5)	Just perfect fifth (3:2) 15ma	Just major third (5:4) 15ma	315.64 : 3102.00
1/5	Yellow dot	Just major third (5:4) 15ma	Just major third (5:4)	Just major third (5:4) 15ma	2 octaves	386.31 : 2786.30
1/4	Orange dot	2 octaves	Just perfect fourth (4:3)	2 octaves	Just perfect fifth (3:2) 8va	498.04 : 2400.00
2/7	Blue dot	Harmonic seventh (7:4) 8va	Lesser septimal tritone (7:5)	Harmonic seventh (7:4) 15ma	Just major third (5:4) 15ma	582.51 : 1782.51
1/3	Red dot	Just perfect fifth (3:2) 8va	Just perfect fifth (3:2)	Just perfect fifth (3:2) 15ma	Octave	701.96 : 1901.96
2/5	Yellow dot	Just major third (5:4) 8va	Just major sixth (5:3)	Just major third (5:4) 15ma	Just perfect fifth (3:2) 8va	884.36 : 1586.31
3/7	Blue dot	Septimal minor third (7:6) 8va	Harmonic seventh (7:4)	Harmonic seventh (7:4) 15ma	2 octaves	968.83 : 1466.87
1/2	Grey dot	Octave	Octave	Octave	Unison	1200.00 : 1200.00
4/7	Blue dot	Harmonic seventh (7:4)	Septimal minor third (7:6) 8va	Harmonic seventh (7:4) 15ma	Just perfect fifth (3:2) 8va	1466.87 : 968.83
3/5	Yellow dot	Just major sixth (5:3)	Just major third (5:4) 8va	Just major third (5:4) 15ma	Octave	1586.31 : 884.36
2/3	Red dot	Just perfect fifth (3:2)	Just perfect fifth (3:2) 8va	Just perfect fifth (3:2) 8va	Unison	1901.96 : 701.96
5/7	Blue dot	Lesser septimal tritone (7:5)	Harmonic seventh (7:4) 8va	Harmonic seventh (7:4) 15ma	Octave	1782.51 : 582.51
3/4	Orange dot	Just perfect fourth (4:3)	2 octaves	2 octaves	Unison	2400.00 : 498.04
4/5	Yellow dot	Just major third (5:4)	Just major third (5:4) 15ma	Just major third (5:4) 15ma	Unison	2786.30 : 386.31
5/6	Green dot	Just minor third (6:5)	Just perfect fifth (3:2) 15ma	Just perfect fifth (3:2) 15ma	Unison	3102.00 : 315.64
6/7	Blue dot	Septimal minor third (7:6)	Harmonic seventh (7:4) 15ma	Harmonic seventh (7:4) 15ma	Unison	3368.80 : 266.87

== See also ==
- Monochord
