= Tritare =

Experimental guitar

A tritare (Note: Pronounced to rhyme with guitar. The prefix tri indicates that each string has 3 branches. The final e is by analogy with the French spelling guitare.) is an experimental guitar invented in 2003 by mathematicians Samuel Gaudet and Claude Gauthier of the Université de Moncton of a family of stringed instruments which use Y-shaped strings, instead of the usual linear strings.

== Instrument sound and reactions ==
Y-shaped strings can produce sounds which are harmonic integer multiples, but also non-harmonic sounds more akin to those produced by percussion instruments.

The model uses 6 strings and was commercially available for a short period. The sound effects achieved with the instrument are similar to the sounds that can be achieved with the 3rd bridge playing technique. When tuned correctly, the Y-shaped strings create Chladni patterns.

Depending on how each note is played, Gaudet explains that non-harmonic ingredients can be included and offer a richer sound than a classical stringed instrument.
