= Lollar Pickups =

American company that makes guitar pickups

- Company type: Private
- Industry: Pickup (music technology)
- Founded: 1987
- Founders: Jason Lollar and Stephanie Lollar
- Headquarters: Tacoma, WA, United States
- Number of employees: 20
- Website: www.lollarguitars.com

Lollar Pickups is a Tacoma, Washington-based company that creates pickups for electric, bass, and steel guitars. The company was founded in 1995 by luthier Jason Lollar.

== Products ==
The company produces a range of electric guitar pickups.
