= 3rd bridge =

Guitar where the bridge extends beyond its usual stop

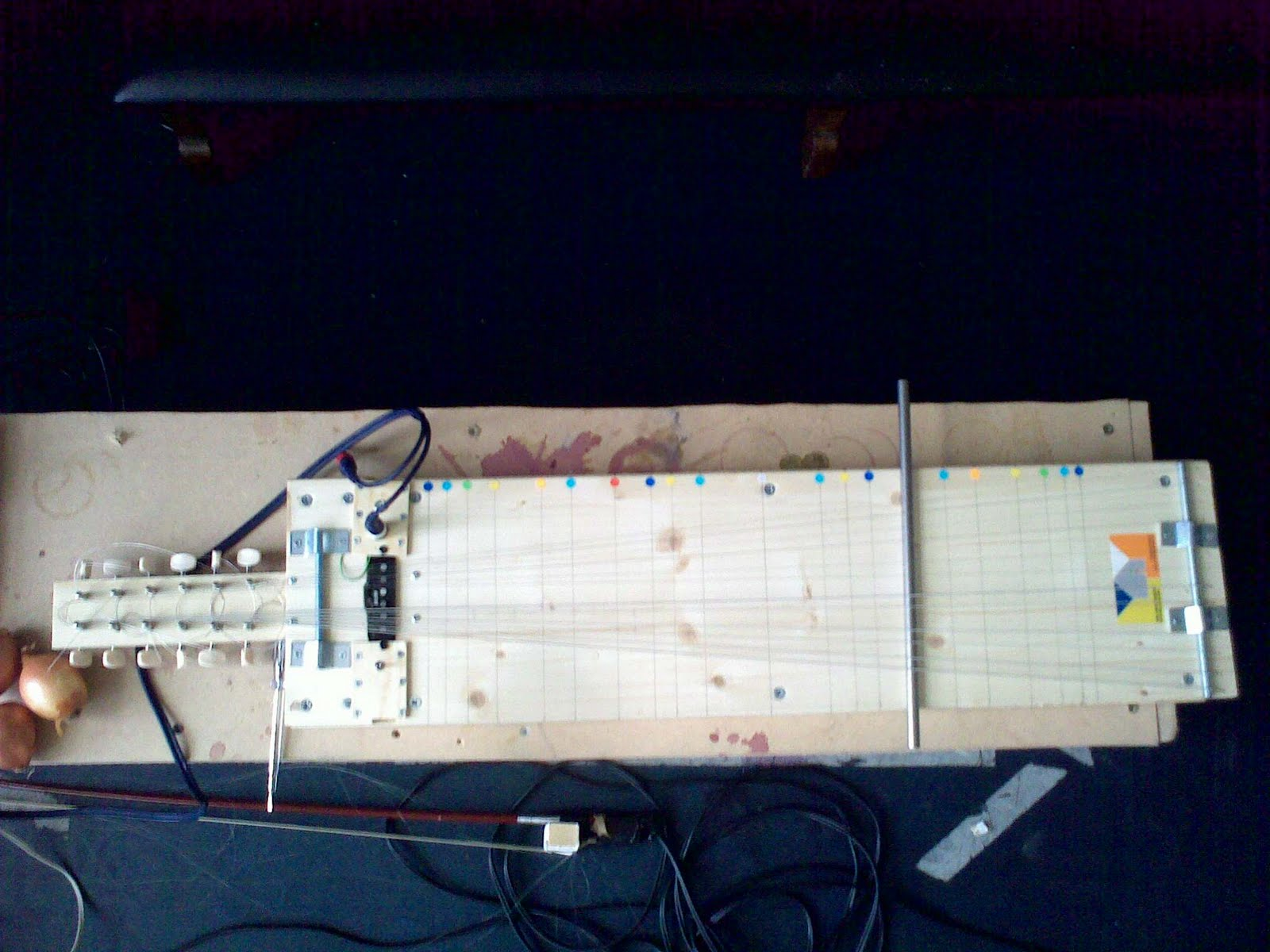
Yuri Landman's Home Swinger, 12 string 3rd bridge zither

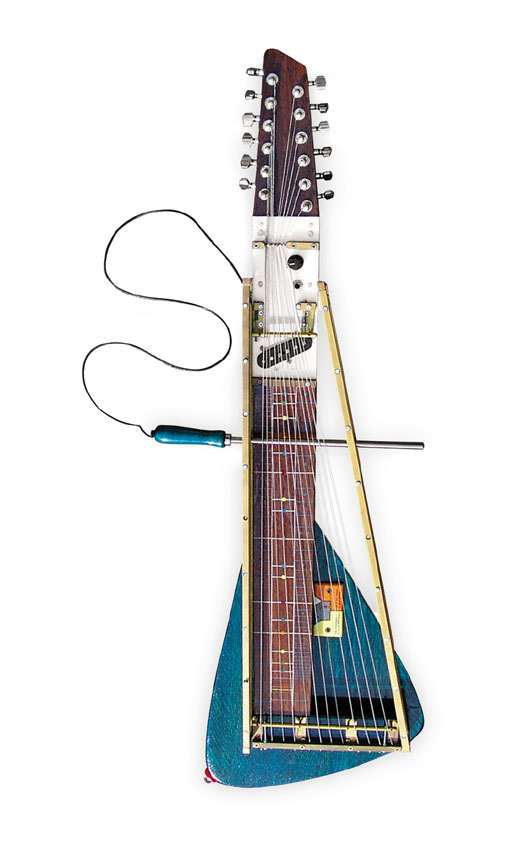
Landman's 2006 Moodswinger, a 12 string overtone zither.

Different possible shapes of a third bridge: "a common six-sided pencil [4mm contact], a round dowel [more focused contact], and an L-shaped bracket [even more fine]." The pencil creates "a damping effect and also prevents energy from transferring across the bridge to the opposing string segment," with the dowel, "resulting in greater sustain and cross-string resonance," and the bracket, "offers even more sustain than a [round] dowel."

The 3rd bridge is an extended playing technique used on the electric guitar and other string instruments that allows a musician to produce distinctive timbres and overtones that are unavailable on a conventional string instrument with two bridges (a nut and a saddle). The timbre created with this technique is close to that of gamelan instruments like the bonang and similar Indonesian types of pitched gongs.

A third bridge can be devised by inserting a rigid preparation object between the strings and the body or neck of the instrument, effectively dividing the string into distinct vibrating segments.

Third-bridge instruments can be custom-made by experimental luthiers (as with guitars designed and played by Hans Reichel); modified from a non-third-bridge instrument (as with conventional guitars modified with a pencil or screwdriver under the strings); or may take advantage of design quirks of factory-built instruments (as with the Fender Jazzmaster, which has strings that continue from the "standard" bridge to the vibrato mechanism).

Perhaps the best-known examples of this technique come from No Wave artists like Glenn Branca and Sonic Youth. The 3rd-bridge technique has a physical connection with Pythagoras' monochord, because both function with the scale of harmonics. Many non-Western musical scales and musical instruments share these consonant just pitch relations.

== Physical explanation ==
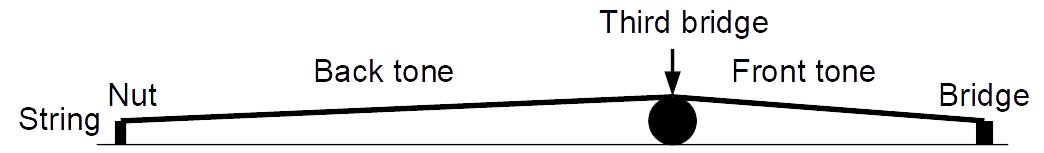
3rd bridge preparation, the front and the back tone are in a reciprocal relationship and known as the bi-tone

On a standard guitar, the string is held above the soundboard by two nodes: the "nut" (near the headstock) and the "bridge" (near the player's right hand on a standard guitar). A player sounding a note on a standard guitar vibrates a single portion of the string (between the nut and the bridge or between their fretting finger and the bridge).

In contrast, a third bridge divides the string into two pieces. When played at one part of a string, the opposed part can resonate in a subharmonic of the struck part, depending on a predictable mathematical ratio of the strings' lengths.

On harmonic positions, the created multiphonic tone is consonant and increases in volume and sustain because of the reciprocal string resonance. The sound is comparable with the sound of bells or clocks:

"yielding bell-like resonant sounds...enabled the guitar to more resemble percussive instruments like bells, gongs, and chimes".

Yuri Landman published a first clarifying 3rd bridge diagram related to this subject in 2012. He published a more elaborate version of this diagram in 2017.

== Examples ==
In the 1930s, Harry Partch experimented with this technique on an instrument he called a Kithara that had movable glass rods. In the late 1960s, Keith Rowe made occasional use of third-bridge guitars, inspiring a slew of experimental guitarists (notably Fred Frith) to use prepared guitars, inspired by John Cage's technique of the prepared piano. Classical guitar duo Elgart & Yates wrote a small book, Prepared Guitar Techniques, in which the technique is described and used in the added written musical piece, although not defined with the term "third bridge" yet. From the 1970s, Hans Reichel's self-made and modified acoustic guitars sometimes featured third bridges.

From the late 1970s, Glenn Branca adopted Partch's theory and used amplified string tables for some of his symphonies. After being trained in the Branca orchestra, Sonic Youth applied their own guitars with screwdrivers, mainly in their early years. On their debut EP and the album Confusion is Sex this technique is often used. Afterwards Bradford Reed developed the Pencilina. Reed plays mainly with drumsticks hitting the strings as well. "Nails" (2004) by Kaki King uses a third bridge set over the 16th fret, and the technique has also been used by Fred Frith and Keith Rowe in addition to Branca, Moore, and Ranaldo.

== Without the 3rd bridge ==
The sound effect can be achieved without an additional 3rd bridge or extended tail piece. If the player presses on a fret (not behind it, as with standard fretting) and strums the string at the head side, the resonance comes through. Again, on harmonic positions the result is much louder and clearer than on the inharmonic fret positions. The 5th, 7th, 12th, and 19th frets generate low-frequency humming overtones with the complementary tone, which is usually played in the regular way. This playing technique causes a smooth, round, multiphonic sound. By muting the resonating part and letting it go after the pluck, it sounds like an inverse recorded sound. On all other positions, the tone is more undefined and comes with higher-pitched, lower-volume overtones. With heavy distortion, these tones can become more clear.

== Bowing behind the bridge ==
The technique is widely used in many modern classical works on bowing instruments. The extended technique involves bowing the instrument on the afterlength, the short length of string behind the bridge. The tone is very high and squeaky. By playing the instrument at a string part behind the bridge, the opposed part starts to resonate. The tone is louder at harmonic relations of the bridge string length. On violins, the tone can be very high, even above the range of human hearing. Depending on the instrument, the pitch of the tones may or may not be perceived (cellos and double basses are more likely to produce recognizable pitches because of their longer strings). This technique is used extensively in Krzysztof Penderecki's Threnody to the Victims of Hiroshima. Another example is found in Ferde Grofé’s Grand Canyon Suite, where bowing behind the bridge in a violin cadenza represents a donkey's braying.

== Guitars commonly used for this effect ==
- Fender Jazzmaster
- Fender Jaguar
- SX SJM
- Teisco guitars with tailed bridges
- New Complexity Australian-made 3rd bridge guitars
