= Home Swinger =

Musical instrument

Home swinger
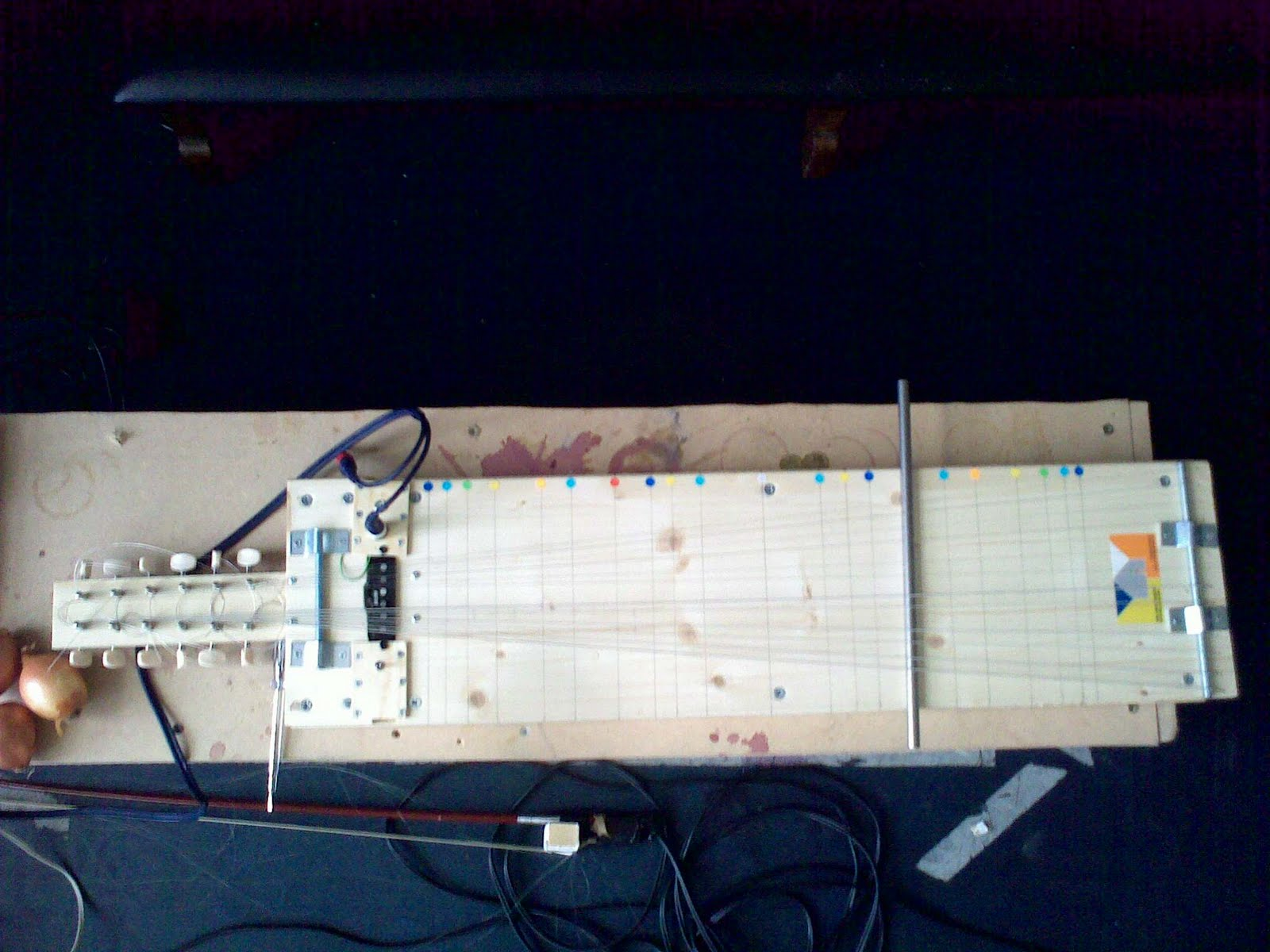

String instrument
- Hornbostel–Sachs classification: 314.11 (True board zither without resonator)
- Inventor: Yuri Landman

A Home Swinger is a musical instrument created by Yuri Landman. The instrument has 12 strings, an electronic pickup and a movable rod to alter the pitch of the instrument.

Landman created the instrument for workshops at European festivals and venues, where participants built their own copy within four hours. The instrument was also featured in the United States in a 2010 workshop at the Knitting Factory. At those events, Landman performed with the participants.

The Home Swinger is derived from his Moodswinger and a DIY-version of this instrument. When played at one part of a string, the opposed part starts to resonate, depending on a predictable mathematical ratio of the strings' lengths divided by the rod.

The instrument was nominated as one of the instruments for the second Guthman Musical Instrument Competition 2010 at the Georgia Institute of Technology, Atlanta. In 2010 the Musical Instrument Museum in Phoenix, Arizona, included a Home Swinger as well as a Moodswinger in their collection as two pieces of the Dutch section of musical instrument inventions. The Rotterdam based art space and music venue WORM owns a Home Swinger together with a series of other instruments made by Landman, in their music studio for their artist-in-residence program.
