= Aeolian harp =

Type of musical instrument

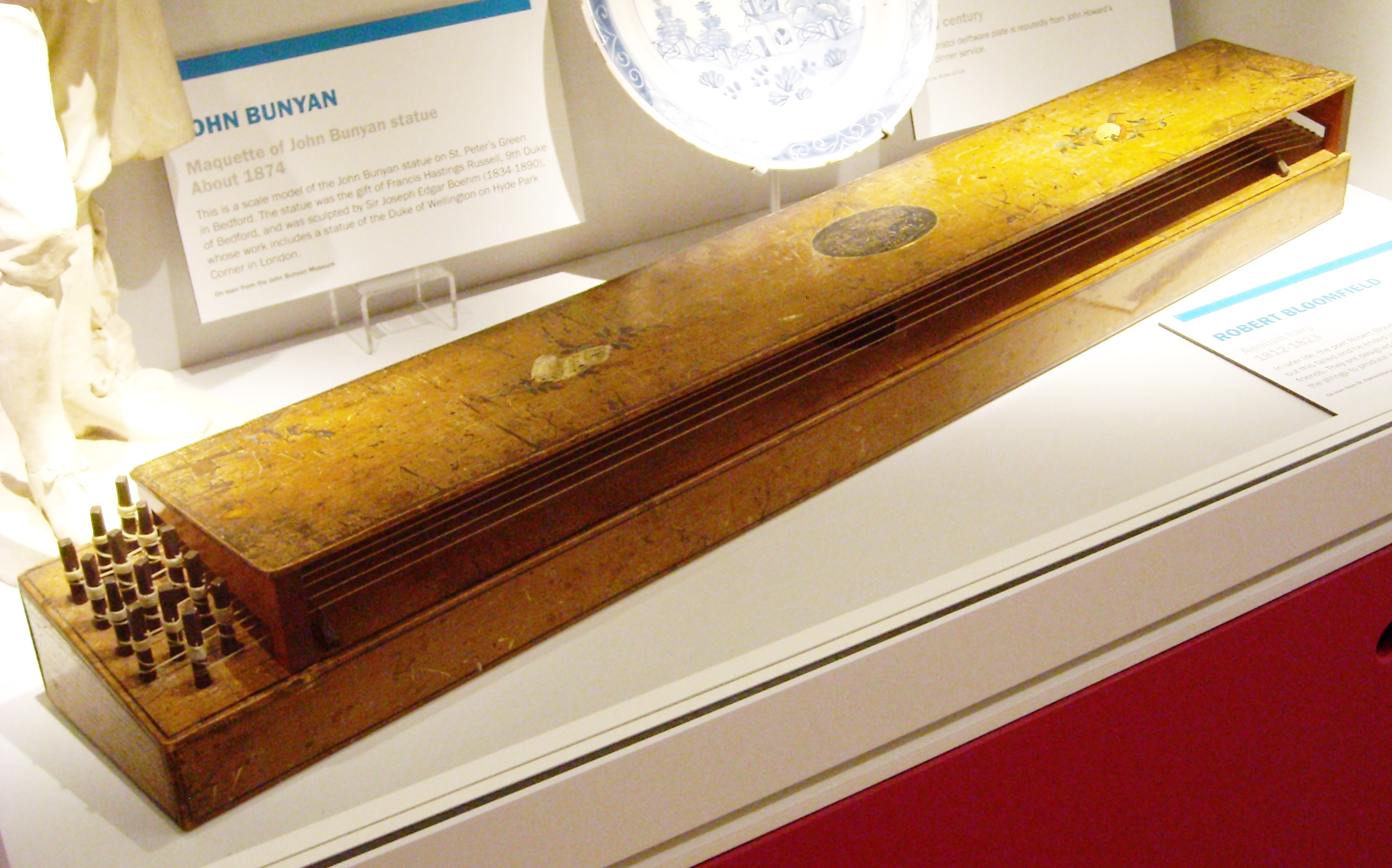
Aeolian harp made by Robert Bloomfield

An Aeolian harp (also wind harp) is a musical instrument that is played by the wind. Named after Aeolus, the ancient Greek god of the wind, the traditional Aeolian harp is essentially a wooden box including a sounding board, with strings stretched lengthwise across two bridges. It is often placed in a slightly opened window where the wind can blow across the strings to produce sounds. The strings can be made of different materials (or thicknesses) and all be tuned to the same pitch, or identical strings can be tuned to different pitches. Besides being the only string instrument played solely by the wind, the Aeolian harp is also the only string instrument that plays solely harmonic frequencies. They are recognizable by the sound which is a result of this property, which has been described as eerie and ethereal.

The Aeolian harp – already known in the ancient world – was first described by Athanasius Kircher (1602–1680) in his books Musurgia Universalis (1650) and Phonurgia Nova (1673). It became popular as a household instrument during the Romantic era, and Aeolian harps are still hand-crafted today. Some are now made in the form of monumental metal sound sculptures located on the roofs of buildings and windy hilltops.

The quality of sound depends on many factors, including the lengths, gauges, and types of strings, the character of the wind, and the material of the resonating body. Metal-framed instruments with no sound board produce a music very different from that produced by wind harps with wooden sound boxes and sound boards. There is no percussive aspect to the sound like that produced by a wind chime; rather crescendos and decrescendos of harmonic frequencies are played in rhythm to the winds. As Aeolian harps are played without human intervention, the sounds they produce are an example of aleatoric music.

Aside from varying in material, Aeolian harps come in many different shapes. Some resemble standard harps, others box zithers, others lyres, and, in one monument, a fiddle. More modern Aeolian harps can more closely resemble lawn ornaments than any traditional string instrument. The unifying characteristic between all Aeolian harps, regardless of appearance, is their source of sound, the strings, and the fact they are played by the wind. This distinguishes Aeolian harps from other instruments played by the wind, such as wind chimes.

== Operation ==
von Kármán vortex street

The harp is driven by the von Kármán vortex street effect. The motion of the wind across a string causes periodic vortices downstream, and this alternating vortex causes the string to vibrate. Lord Rayleigh first solved the mystery of the Aeolian harp in a paper published in the Philosophical Magazine in 1915. The effect can sometimes be observed in overhead utility lines, fast enough to be heard or slow enough to be seen. Similar taut wires like non-telescoping radio antennae, ships' anchor lines, and stiff rods also exhibit this phenomenon.

The effect results in Aeolian harps only producing overtones. Were the strings plucked, they would produce the fundamental frequency in addition to several overtones. When the string oscillates due to the wind, though, it always does so in fractions such as halves, thirds, quarters, fifths, and so on. This naturally produces overtones, most commonly the third, octave, and twelfth, without resulting in the fundamental frequency being played.

== Construction ==
An Aeolian harp can, in concept, be constructed from as little as a single taut string. Most household Aeolian harps are made of wood, featuring a sound board and sound hole to improve how the instrument resonates. In terms of size, they are usually about one metre by 13 centimetres by 8 centimetres, with ten to twelve gut strings stretched over two bridges. On some Aeolian harps, all the strings are tuned to the same frequency, as the wind will already influence the pitch by yielding different overtones depending on its intensity. Other Aeolian harps have differently tuned strings, which enable them to produce chords. Aeolian harps lend themselves to being tuned to a major or minor pentatonic scale and octaves of the notes within, as all intervals in these scales are at least moderately consonant. This way, no matter how the wind strikes the strings, the resulting music will be euphonious.

There are more challenges with designing a larger Aeolian harp. For one, a sound chamber at such sizes takes much more material to make. Instead of making a large sound chamber, designers of Aeolian harps approaching seven meters in height use different mechanisms to increase the volume of their instruments. At these heights, they usually prefer upright designs, which allow the instrument to catch more wind for a louder sound. To this same end, Aeolian harps can be placed in the way of natural wind tunnels or have wind scoops to direct more airflow over the strings. In one case, large metal dishes have even been used as amplification devices. For a building material, metal is generally preferred to wood at this scale due to how metal can withstand the environment for longer, needs less maintenance, and is stabler and stronger than wood.

== History ==
The ability of the wind to play string instruments has been known and referenced since ancient times. Aeolian harps have been found in China, Ethiopia, Greece, India, Indonesia, and Melanesia.

== Prevalence ==
Aside from famous Aeolian harp monuments, many can be found along isolated expanses of the European coast in countries such as Denmark, Germany, and Sweden, where they are played by strong ocean winds. Recently, they have become more popular as lawn and window ornaments.

== In literature and music ==
=== Literature ===
The Aeolian harp has a long history of being associated with the numinous, perhaps for its vibrant timbres that produce an ethereal sound. Homer relates that Hermes invented the lyre from dried sinews stretched over a tortoise shell. It was able to be played by the wind. The same is said of the lyre of King David, which was played by a wind sent from God.

Aeolian harps have been featured and mentioned in a number of poems. These include at least four Romantic-era poems: "The Eolian Harp" and "Dejection, an Ode", both by Samuel Taylor Coleridge, and "Mutability" and "Ode to the West Wind" by Percy Bysshe Shelley. The former of these two appears alongside his essay "A Defence of Poetry". Henry David Thoreau also wrote a poem called "Rumors from an Aeolian Harp", which he included in the "Monday" chapter of his first book, A Week on the Concord and Merrimack Rivers.

Aeolian harps have also been mentioned in several novels. These include Herman Melville's White-Jacket (1850), George Eliot's Middlemarch (1871–72), Thomas Hardy's The Trumpet-Major (1880) and The Mayor of Casterbridge (1886), and Vladimir Nabokov's Lolita (1955). James Joyce had a short section "O, Harp Eolian!" in the Aeolus chapter of Ulysses (1922). More recently, an Aeolian harp was also featured in Ian Fleming's 1964 children's novel Chitty-Chitty-Bang-Bang to make a cave seem haunted. In William Heinesen's novel The Lost Musicians (1950), set in Tórshavn, character Kornelius Isaksen takes his three sons to a little church where, in the tower, they sit listening to the "capriciously varying sounds of an Aeolian harp", which leads the boys into a lifelong passion for music. El arpa eólica (The Aeolian Harp) is an alternate history novelette written by Óscar Esquivias. It was originally published in 2011 by Fábulas de Albión. The novelette depicts the life of Berlioz as a young student in Paris.

=== Music ===
Imitations of the Aeolian harp have been present in classical music since at least the early nineteenth century. Builders of pipe organs have included stops intended to imitate the sound and timbre of the Aeolian harp. German builders were the first to include such a stop from the 1820s. The organ stop labeled "aeolian harp" is not a harp – it does not use a vibrating string – it is simply a rank of low-air-pressure pipes, voiced to imitate the sound of the real aeolian harp. It is, therefore, classified as a string stop. The "aeolian" stops are among the softest found on pipe organs.

Thomas Ward McCain building an Aeolian harp in Burlington, Vermont

A number of classical pieces have been compared to the sounds of the Aeolian harp. One of the oldest has to be the Étude in A-flat major Op. 25, No. 1 for piano (1836) by Frédéric Chopin, which is sometimes called the "Aeolian Harp etude". This nickname was not Chopin's own, being given to it by Robert Schumann. The piece features a delicate, tender, and flowing melody in the fifth finger of the pianist's right hand, over a background of rapid pedaled arpeggios as the free resonances of the pedal-lifted strings flow air-like. A piece written to imitate the instrument's sounds is Sergei Lyapunov's 12 études d'exécution transcendante, Op. 11, No. 9, written between 1897 and 1905, which is named by the author harpes éoliennes (Aeolian harps). In this virtuoso piece, the tremolo accompaniment seems to imitate the sound of the instrument. In classical harp repertoire, an example of such imitation (mostly employing glissandi and arpeggios) is "La harpe éolienne" by Félix Godefroid. Later, Henry Cowell's Aeolian Harp (1923) was one of the first piano pieces to feature extended techniques on the piano that included plucking and sweeping the pianist's hands directly across the strings of the piano.

The Aeolian harp's sounds have also been sought after in more recent music. In 1972, Chuck Hancock and Harry Bee recorded a giant 30-foot-tall (9.1 m) Aeolian harp designed and built by 22-year-old Thomas Ward McCain on a hilltop in Chelsea, Vermont. United released their double LP titled The Wind Harp: Song from the Hill. An excerpt of this recording appears in the movie The Exorcist. The harp was destroyed in a hurricane, but it was rebuilt and now resides in Hopkinton, New Hampshire.

Australian artist, composer and sound sculptor Alan Lamb has created and recorded several very large-scale Aeolian harps, and Roger Winfield's album Windsongs was "created using an orchestra of eight aeolian harps played entirely by the wind." (Discogs) In the spirit of this, in 2003 an Aeolian harp was constructed at the Burning Man festival.

The Aeolian harp is especially common in modern music being sampled as a backing track for its eerie, exotic, and unique sound. On his album Dis (1976), jazz saxophonist Jan Garbarek used as a background sound recordings of an Aeolian harp, designed and built by Sverre Larssen (1916–1983), that was situated at a Norwegian fjord. British producer Bonobo also sampled an Aeolian harp on his album Black Sands (2010). Subsequently, the English minimalist ensemble Ex-Easter Island Head incorporated the sound of a DIY wind harp on their album Norther (2024), citing the works of Max Eastley as an influence.

== Monumental Aeolian harps ==
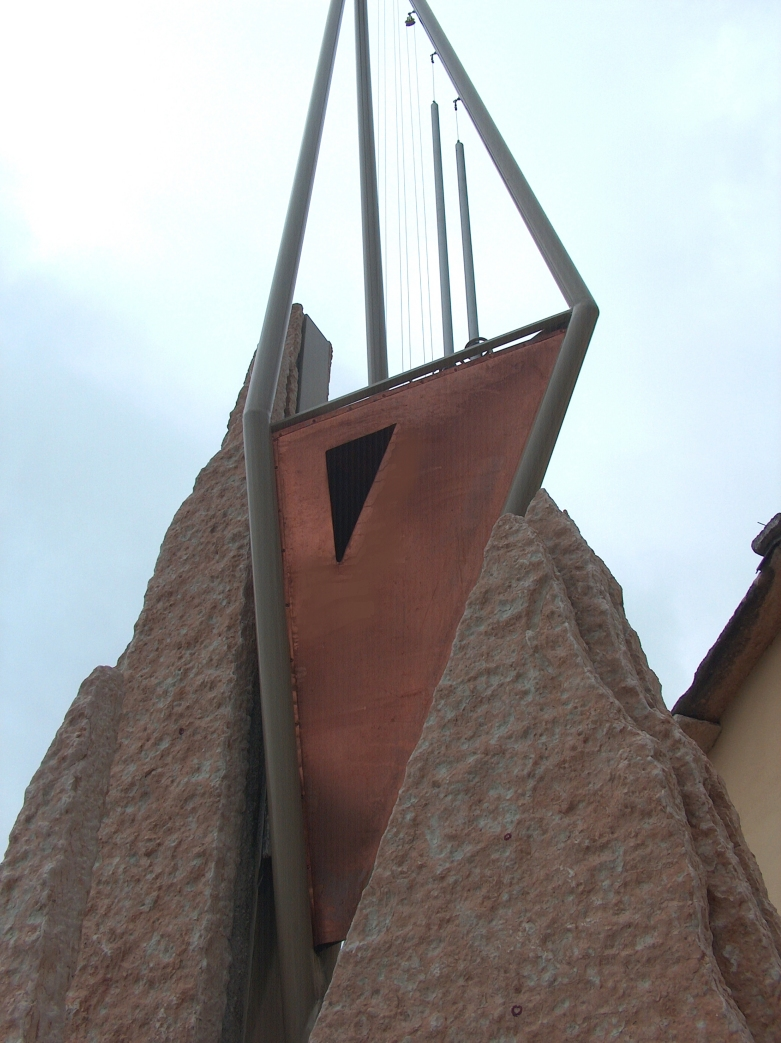
Aeolian harp of Mazzano

In recent history, a number of Aeolian harps exceeding six metres in height have been constructed. Aeolian harps of this size are normally made from metal.

In Negrar, in the province of Verona (Italy), is a modern monument Aeolian harp more than six metres high. It is a sound monument designed by the Italian architect Giuseppe Ferlenga which was inaugurated in November 2015 from the Sports and Cultural Group of Mazzano. The acoustic part of this tool is composed of a frame that contains a copper harmonic case. The Aeolian Harp of Negrar has six strings of different lengths and materials. If there is wind, this monumental harp produces audible sounds up to a distance of about four metres.

There are many more Aeolian harps of this size and larger in North America. In the Mimbres Valley of New Mexico, there is an Aeolian harp, titled Tempest Song, exceeding seven metres in height. Tempest Song is similar in appearance to a standard harp with 45 strings tuned to the C minor pentatonic scale and a central bearing originally from a semi-truck. It was built by Bob Griesing and Bill Neely in June and July 2000, and at the time was mistakenly declared the "World's Largest Aeolian Harp".

An even larger Aeolian harp, measuring eight metres tall, can be found at the Exploratorium, a museum in San Francisco. This harp was built in 1976 by Douglas Hollis, a local artist. Its volume is amplified by two metal disks placed on one side of it. In addition, a natural wind tunnel ensures that enough wind passes over the harp's seven high-pitched strings.

In Sydney, Nova Scotia, on Cape Breton is an even larger 18-metre-tall, 10 ton steel Aeolian harp which doubles as the world's largest fiddle. It was erected to honour the fiddling traditions and folk music of the region's Celtic population. This fiddle, unveiled in 2005, is titled Fidhael Mhor a' Ceilidh, or, in English, "Big Fiddle of the Ceilidh", "Ceilidh" roughly translating from Gaelic into "visit." This fiddle is so large it can be seen by ships coming into harbour on the island.

The largest Aeolian harp in the world is the Lucia and Aristides Demetrios Wind Harp in South San Francisco, which stands at 28 metres tall. This Aeolian harp is located a little over 74 metres above sea level, which means it always receives a suitable breeze and that it comes with a panoramic view of South San Francisco and some of the Bay. The instrument, which resembles a set of steel beams connected by curved grates, is visible throughout much of the city.
