= Norther =

Norther is a strong north wind, a wind blowing from the north.

Norther may refer to:

- Norther (band), a Finnish heavy metal band
- Norther (album), an album by the English minimalist band Ex-Easter Island Head
- Norther Offshore Wind Farm, an electrical generation facility near Belgium
- Blue Norther (weather), a North American weather phenomenon

== See also ==
- Northern (disambiguation)
