= Lucas Debes =

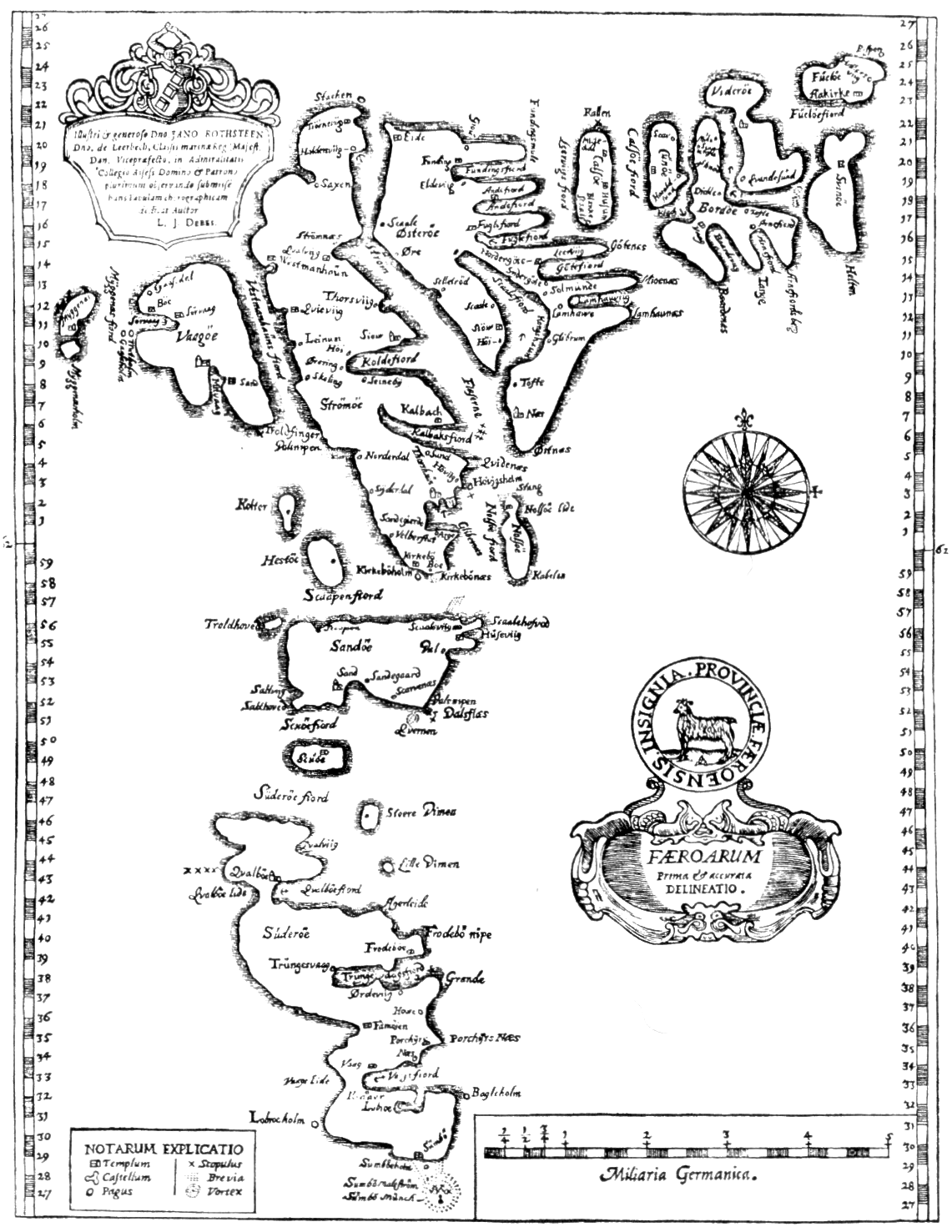
The first map of the Faroe Islands: FÆROARUM - Prima & accurata delineatio by Lucas Debes 1673

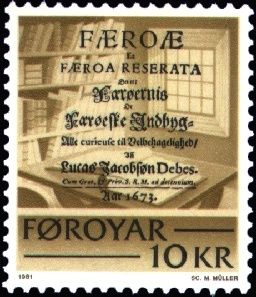
Debes, Lucas Jacobsøn: Færoæ et Færoa Reserata, Denmark 1673 Stamp FR 63 of the Faroe Islands Engraver: Max Müller Issued: 19 October 1981

Lucas Jacobsøn Debes (1623 in Stubbekøbing – 28 September 1675) was a Danish priest, topographer and celebrated writer about the Faroe Islands. He wrote the first book about the Faroes, which was printed (and translated into English and German) and drew the first detailed map of the Islands.

== Biography ==
Debes was born at Stubbekøbing of the island of Falster in Denmark. He graduated from school at Slagelse in 1647. He came to the Faroe Islands in 1652 as a curate. The next year he became a parish vicar in Suðurstreymoy and later he became the new head of the Latin school in Tórshavn. He was both well-educated and hard-working, and the school improved considerately during his time there. After he settled in Tórshavn he married Anne Rasmusdatter, widow of his predecessor, in accordance with local Faroese tradition. However, since his predecessor had left behind him not only a widow but also nine children, it meant that money was very scarce and therefore he was often in debt. This in turn meant that he owed money to the local trading monopoly.

In 1658 Debes went on a journey to Copenhagen. The reason was a dispute between Debes and the bailiff Johannes Heidemann. Although an official war manifesto was never declared, Denmark and Sweden were at war. Therefore, in mid-journey the ship was taken over by the Swedes. Debes now became a prisoner in Gothenburg. Luckily, through his fine knowledge and preaching, Debes managed to win the trust of the commandant. This meant that Debes was released the following year. After his release he successfully reached Copenhagen according with his original plans. After his returned to the Faroe Islands, he was made a deputy rural dean.

When King Frederick III of Denmark endowed the Faroe Islands to his favourite statesman Kristoffer Gabel (1617–1673), Debes entered a bitter feud with his administration who suppressed the islanders in various ways. There came considerable complaints from the islands' inhabitants of unjust treatment by the civil administration in Tórshavn. This included the persons in charge of the monopoly trade, the bailiff and others. Debes is chiefly known for standing up for islanders mistreated by those who abused their power. He tried several times to inform the central administration in Denmark of the wrongdoings, but was stopped every time by the bailiff. Eventually in 1673 he managed to get away from the islands to carry out his plan and this consequently improved the situation of the Faroes. During his stay in Copenhagen, Debes acquire his master's degree in 1673. After his return to the Faroe Islands, Debes died in 1675.

== Historical contribution ==
Debes has become best known for his book about the Faroe Islands, Færoæ et Færoa reserata, first published in Danish in 1673. It is one of the earliest books ever written about the Faroe Islands. It is an historical and scientific according, which also includes the first map of the Faroe Islands.

== Legacy ==
In the novel The Good Hope by noted Faroese author William Heinesen, the main character the Rev. Peder Børresen is based on Lucas Debes. Heinesen received the Nordic Council's Literature Prize in 1964 for the novel. In the story Heinesen had the difficult task of reproducing seventeenth-century Danish. He succeeded so well that he won the prize. It is considered by many to be his best work.

== Works and translations ==
- Færoæ & Færoa reserata: Det er Færøernis oc færøeske Indbyggeris beskrifvelse, udi hvilcken føris til liuset adskillige naturens hemeligheder, oc nogle antiqviteter, som her til dags udi mørcket hafve været indelugt, oc nu her opladis / alle curieuse til velbehagelighed, sammenskrefven oc forklaret aff Lucas Jacobsøn Debes. Copenhagen: 1673
  - Færoæ & Færoa reserata, Einars Prent og Forlag, Tórshavn 1963 (reprint)
- Færoæ, & Færoa reserata: That is a description of the islands & inhabitants of Foeroe: being seventeen islands subject to the King of Denmark, printed by F. L. for William Iles, London 1676 (408 p.)
- Natürliche und Politische Historie der Inseln Färöe, worinnen die Luft, Grund und Boden, Gewässer, Thiere, Vögel, Fische, usw. das Naturel, die Gewohnheiten, Lebensart der Einwohner dieser Inseln und ihre Verfassung beschrieben werden F.C. Pelt, Kopenhagen und Leipzig 1757 (German translation)
  - Natürliche und Politische Historie der Inseln Färöe. Aus dem Dänischen übersetzt von C. G. Mengel, Kopenhagen / Leipzig 1757. Neu herausgegeben, kommentiert und mit einem Nachwort versehen von Norbert B. Vogt. Mülheim a. d. Ruhr: 2005 (annotated reprint)
