= Mallet Guitars One =

EP by Ex-Easter Island Head
- Released: 6 December 2010
- Recorded: 11 August 2010
- Studio: What Studio (Liverpool, UK)
- Genre: Minimalism; drone
- Length: 13:03
- Label: Low Point

Ex-Easter Island Head chronology
Mallet Guitars One (2010)	Mallet Guitars Two / Music for Moai Hava (2012)

Mallet Guitars One is a debut record by English minimalist ensemble Ex-Easter Island Head, based in Liverpool. It was released by Low Point on 6 December 2010. Although technically an EP, it is often regarded as a mini-album within the collective's discography. This record is the first part of the Mallet Guitars trilogy, followed by second and third instalments in 2012 and 2013, respectively.

The music was composed and performed by Benjamin D. Duvall and George Maund, and introduced the ensemble's core instrumentation: three tabletop electric guitars played with percussion mallets. This setup would go on to define Ex-Easter Island Head's later work.

This debut received positive reviews and was included in The Wire's best avant rock releases of 2011.

== Background and recording ==
The ensemble began as a duo comprising Aigburth-based multi-instrumentalist Benjamin Duvall and George Maund, who was then a music student at the University of Liverpool. The project developed following Duvall's departure from playing in conventional bands. Reflecting on its origins, he noted, "One of the things that allowed this project to happen was having lots of cheap guitars, because you're not as precious about them... I had three guitars that I'd paid a total of £200 for and had stopped playing in regular bands shortly before, so my equipment was freed up for experimentation."

The group's distinctive use of tabletop guitars was partly inspired by performances in Liverpool's noise scene. Duvall cited a project called Avian Flu, involving George Maund and Sean Wárs, which used guitars laid flat to create feedback-driven sonic textures. This prompted him to explore how a similar setup might be adapted for more structured or harmonic music: "I really liked that, just the visual aesthetic of that, and then thinking, 'How can tonal music come out of that?'"

Drawing on the guitar-based works of Rhys Chatham and Glenn Branca, but "downplaying the rock element to create a mixture of the band dynamic and a chamber ensemble," Duvall began experimenting with the idea of composing music entirely through striking electric guitars with mallets. Such self-imposed limitations became a defining principle for the ensemble.

This experimentation led to the recording of Mallet Guitars One, which featured three guitars tuned to three sympathetic chords and played by striking their bodies with percussion mallets, allowing the strings to resonate. It was recorded live on 11th August 2010 at St Bride's Church, Liverpool, which also houses What Studio, where the recording and mixing were finalised.

== Release ==
The record was released on 6 December 2010 on Nottingham-based label Low Point, which specialises in ambient, drone, and experimental music. In an interview with LeftLion, label owner Gareth Hardwick said he became aware of Ex-Easter Island Head through Chris Summerlin of the band Kogumaza, who had seen one of the group's early performances.

The original 2010 release was limited to 200 hand-stamped and numbered copies. It was later reissued as part of the self-released compilation album Mallet Guitars One – Three in 2021.

== Reception ==
In a review for The Wire, Nick Southgate described the record as "precise and pulsing rhythmic minimalism," writing that its three compositions "turn the pure punk three-chord mission statement into an austere neoclassical manifesto." He compared the sound, created by striking open-tuned electric guitars with mallets, to being rougher than Steve Reich's marimba works but warmer and gentler than Arnold Dreyblatt's nodal excitation pieces, and highlighted the recording's freshness and vitality.

Hannis Brown of Tokafi described the record as a short but immersive work built around minimalist rhythmic patterns and shifting overtones. He highlighted the use of mallets on solid-body electric guitars, which produces a tone likened to a vibraphone paired with a percussive click. Across its three tracks, the album explores subtle changes in texture and harmony using only three chords, with variations in rhythm and dynamics giving each movement a distinct character. Recorded live in a church, the natural resonance plays a central role in shaping the sound, which evolves without the use of electronic effects or overdubs. Brown compared the music to percussion-based minimalism in the tradition of Steve Reich, Sō Percussion and Tortoise, noting that despite its limited materials, the album achieves a surprisingly rich and varied sonic result.

In a review for ATTN:Magazine, Jack Chuter praised Ex-Easter Island Head for going beyond the apparent simplicity of their concept, which involves striking horizontal electric guitars with mallets. He noted that the music sometimes feels as if it "could have been created by a different method entirely," and highlighted a "gorgeous moment" in the second movement where repetition creates a perceptual split between the percussive attack and the sustained drone. However, Chuter also felt that much of the rhythmic material was "too easy" and criticised parts of the album for sounding too much like "placing a guitar down heavy-handedly," arguing that the group missed an opportunity to explore more complex and disorienting territory.

== Track listing ==
All tracks are written by Benjamin D. Duvall and George Maund.

No.	Title	Length
1.	"1st Movement"	3:30
2.	"2nd Movement"	4:48
3.	"3rd Movement"	4:44
Total length:		13:03

== Personnel ==
Ex-Easter Island Head

- Benjamin D. Duvall – tabletop guitars
- George Maund – tabletop guitars

Technical

- Stephen Cole – recording, mixing
