= Norther (album) =

2024 album by Ex-Easter Island Head

Studio album by Ex-Easter Island Head
- Released: 17 May 2024
- Studio: The Consulate (Liverpool, UK)
- Genre: Minimalism; ambient; experimental
- Length: 37:38
- Label: Rocket Recordings
- Producer: Andrew PM Hunt

Ex-Easter Island Head chronology
Twenty-Two Strings (2016)	Norther (2024)

Singles from Norther
- 1. "Norther" Released: 20 February 2024; 2. "Magnetic Language" Released: 9 April 2024

Norther is the sixth (Note: The album is designated as the band's sixth release based on their own classification, as they have referred to their 2016 album, Twenty-Two Strings, as their fifth album on its Bandcamp page.) album by the English band Ex-Easter Island Head, released on 17 May 2024. It is the band's first studio album in eight years, following Twenty-Two Strings (2016). The album marks the first appearance of Andrew PM Hunt as a permanent member, who also served as its producer and mixing engineer, alongside Benjamin Duvall, Benjamin Fair, and Jonathan Hering. The album was recorded at the band's home studio The Consulate in Liverpool and released by Rocket Recordings.

The album takes its title from the meteorological term norther, which refers to a cold wind from the north. It explores themes of nature, "controlled randomness," and the interaction between technologies. Musically, the band has cited influences from Rhys Chatham and Glenn Branca, known for their experimental guitar compositions, as well as minimalism and extended instrumental forms. They describe the album as incorporating both structured composition and freeform elements, drawing comparisons to the evolving dynamics of The Necks and the rhythmic precision of artists on Kompakt.

Hunt described the band's creative direction, emphasising their desire to make music that is engaging and enjoyable: "It's important to us that it's accessible and fun, that it's not too cerebral." While acknowledging their influences from academic minimalism and late 20th-century avant-garde, he characterised their style as "experimental music presented as entertainment," paraphrasing Stewart Lee's description of the band. (Note: Stewart Lee originally described the band as "minimalist noise art but come on like entertainment.")

Norther received positive reviews from critics and appeared in several year-end album rankings, topping The Quietus' list and placing fourth in Loud and Quiet's. Some critics described it as the band’s strongest work to date.

== Recording ==
On Norther, the band further refined their distinctive method, continuing to use prepared tabletop guitars as percussion instruments and introducing new elements such as haptic motors, an aeolian harp, and sampled voices. While earlier albums took a "documentary approach," aiming to faithfully capture their live performances with minimal studio intervention, Norther was "played, written, and made" in the studio first, with live adaptations coming later. This shift marked a move towards creating "an album listening experience" rather than directly documenting their stage sound. This approach shaped the album’s compositions, with each track incorporating distinct techniques and conceptual elements.

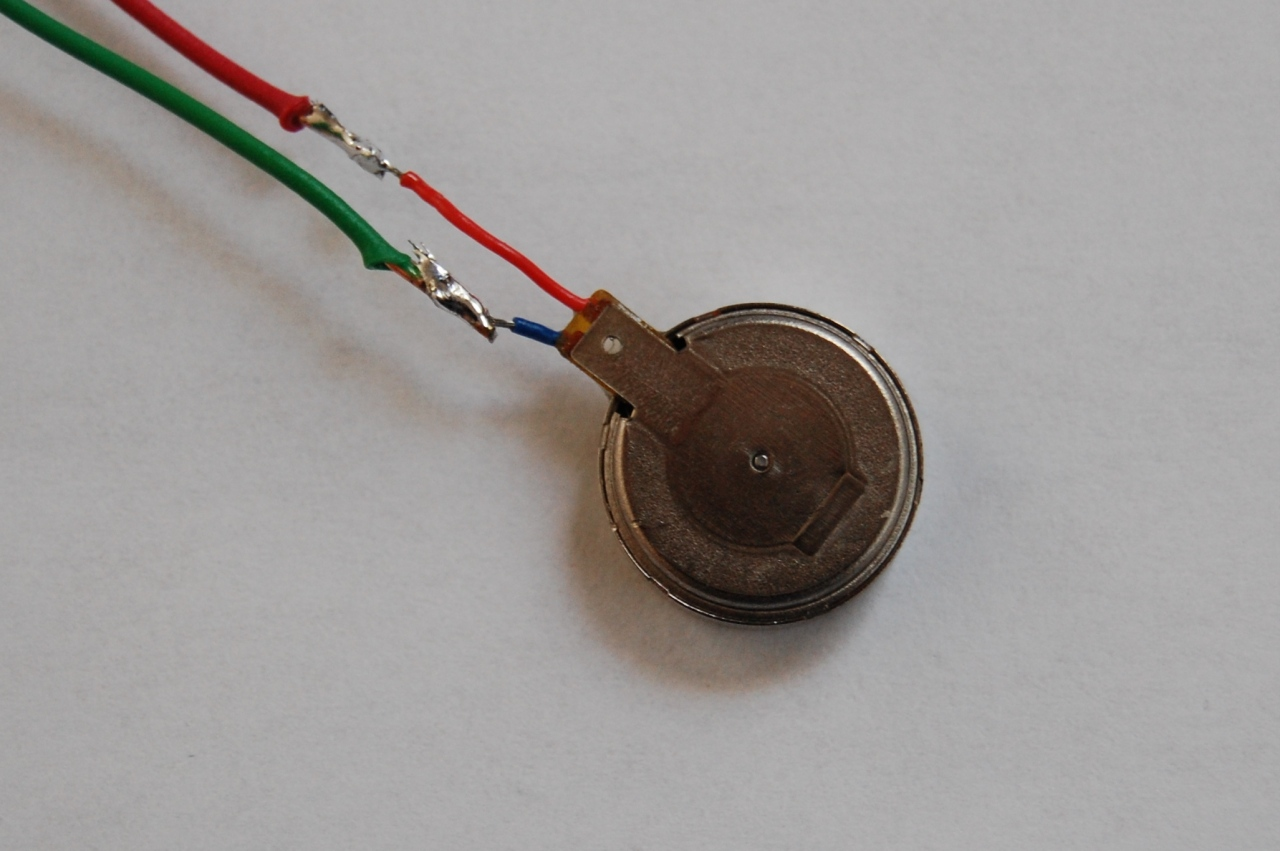
Haptic motors salvaged from mobile phones were used on 'Weather,' generating rain-like sound effects through their vibrations

The opening track, 'Weather', was conceptualised as a "weather system... in the way... [how] the sounds are brought out." To achieve the unpredictable quality of pitter-patter rain, the band used small battery-powered haptic motors extracted from mobile phones running over the guitar strings, a technique introduced to them by Vitalija Glovackyte of the experimental pop duo Hyperdawn.

"Norther"
A sample from the closing section of 'Norther', highlighting the sound of the aeolian harp.

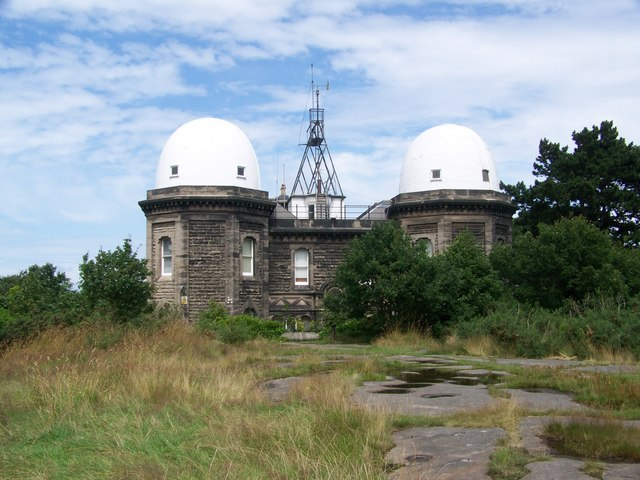
Former observatory on Bidston Hill, one of the highest points on the Wirral, where Duvall recorded an actual norther

The title track, 'Norther', incorporates recordings of an actual norther, captured using an aeolian harp—an instrument played by the wind. The concept was inspired by the work of artist Max Eastley, who has been Duvall’s long-term mentor. Duvall built the harp atop a former observatory on Bidston Hill on the Wirral Peninsula, across the River Mersey from the band's hometown of Liverpool. It was a tall wooden structure resembling a telegraph pole, featuring two small silver mixing bowls as resonators and three vertically stretched strands of fishing line as strings. Duvall described the instrument's character, saying, "When you think of a harp, you obviously start thinking about angelic, but it actually sounds closer to a sine wave or guitar feedback." The Quietus described the harp's sound as "a cool, high, feedback-like hum that sails above the song, and lingers after it." Musically, the track was described in the label's press release as existing "somewhere between Arnold Dreyblatt's Orchestra of Excited Strings and the shimmering minimalism of Kompakt records."

The fourth piece, 'Magnetic Language', features recordings of musicians' voices amplified through guitar pickups, which typically consist of magnets wrapped in copper wire and used to capture string vibrations. The voices were originally intended to be recorded and played back using cassette dictaphones, but the band opted for smartphones instead. The recordings were then played through the pickups, with the resulting output forming part of the track.

The title of the penultimate piece, 'Golden Bridges', refers to the brass rods placed beneath the strings of fretless guitars, acting as a third bridge to alter their harmonics. According to the band, the track was influenced by the noise experiments of the German industrial group Einstürzende Neubauten.

== Release and promotion ==
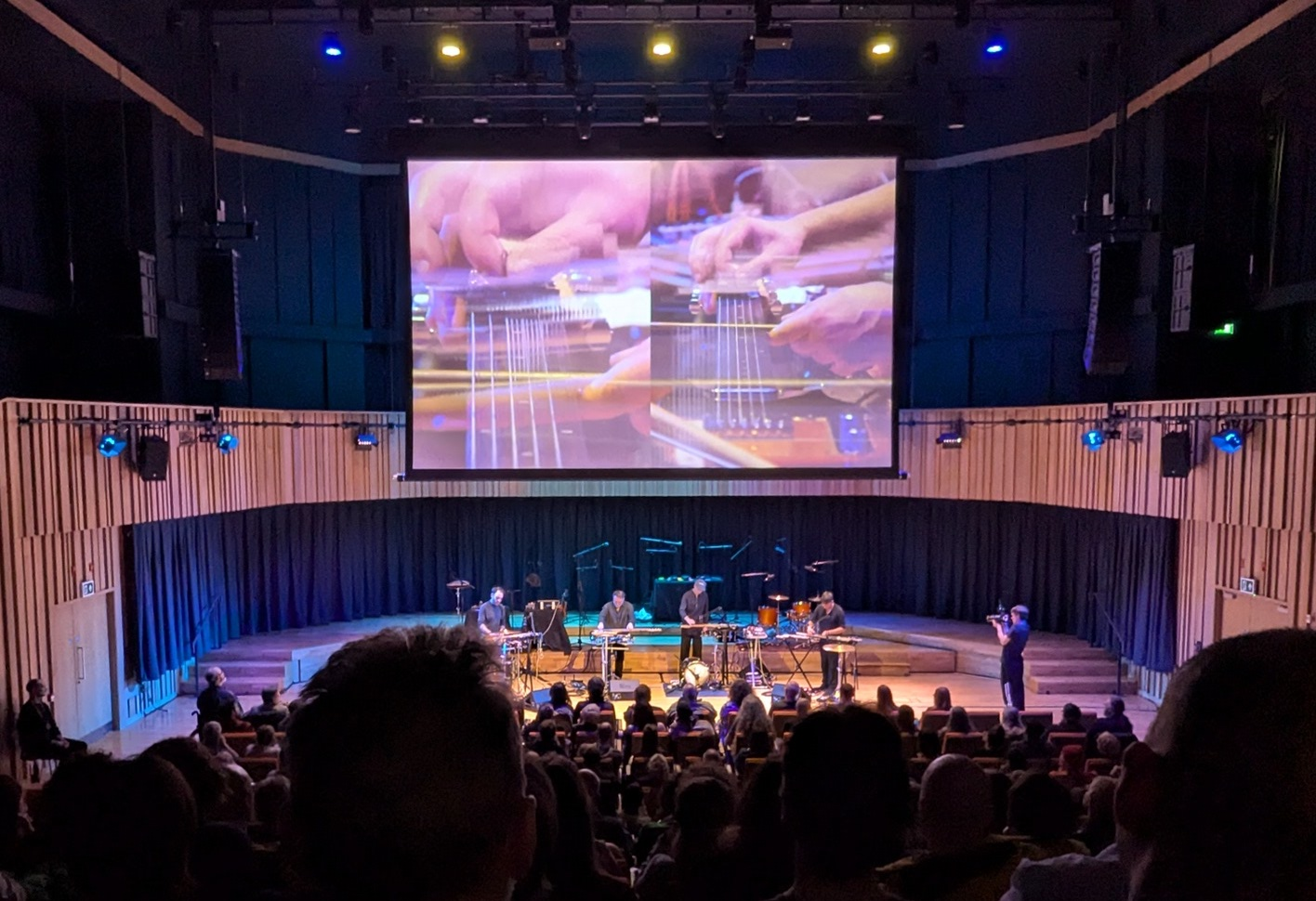
Ex-Easter Island Head performing a home show in Liverpool, accompanied by live-edited visuals projected above the stage

The album was announced on 20 February 2024 alongside the release of the single Norther. In total, two singles–Norther and Magnetic Language–were released, each accompanied by a music video. The album, released on 17 May 2024, was followed by a UK tour and festival appearances, including performances at the Acid Horse festival, End of the Road Festival, Sonic City Festival in Kortrijk, Belgium, and Le Guess Who? in Utrecht, Netherlands. Later in the year, the band performed a hometown show at Liverpool's Tung Auditorium, with support from sound artist Lola de la Mata and drummer Charles Hayward.

In May 2024, the title track was featured on the compilation released alongside the Dutch-language magazine Gonzo (circus). Writing for the magazine, Katrien Schuermans described it as: "The music... immediately pulls you in, with guitars and a rumbling bass in a repetitive piece that sounds more minimal than you might expect from that description... On the hypnotic Norther, the north wind hums along with passionate intensity."

At the end of 2024, an unreleased live version of the album, recorded at the Acid Horse festival was selected as The Quietus' Download of the Year for its subscribers.

The album received airplay on BBC Radio 3, with the track 'Easter' appearing on Late Junction and Unclassified. The band also appeared live in session on BBC Radio 6 Music with Marc Riley and Gideon Coe.

== Critical reception ==
=== Reviews ===
Professional ratings
Review scores
Source	Rating
Loud and Quiet	8/10
NARC.	5/5 stars
Ondarock	8/10
Uncut	8/10

Norther received positive reviews. In a five-star review for the independent music magazine NARC. magazine, Lee Fisher described the album as the band's "masterpiece" and "a rich and rewarding listen," praising their "playful approach to their instruments" and the sense of joy and possibility in their music.

Loud and Quiet's Theo Gorst gave the album 8 out of 10, likening the record to "a gamelan of shifting musical moods; glittering kosmische, drone and ambience all cohabit, and often in the same song." He noted how the title track "allows bombast to sidle up to experimentation" in a way reminiscent of Anna Meredith, while 'Magnetic Language,' with its serene, meditative opening, evokes Laraaji before introducing vocal samples that "flutter and swoop ricocheting back and forth."

Uncut magazine awarded the album 8/10, with Daniel Dylan Wray describing it as “deeply elemental, textural and tactile, blowing with all the force and quiet grace of the wind.” He highlighted the hypnotic energy of the title track and the layered vocal harmonies of 'Magnetic Language' as examples of the band's breadth and depth.

In another 8 out of 10 review by an Italian music blog Ondarock, Marco Sgrignoli described the album as "hypnotising from the first note", suggesting that it "might resonate with many listeners" without requiring "deep dive into... [the band's] decade-long career or the experimental/no-wave/post-minimalist landscape they inhabit."

In his unscored review for Ptolemaic Terrascope, Ian Fraser praised Norther for its meticulous yet experimental approach, drawing comparisons to A Winged Victory for the Sullen, Talking Heads, and Laurie Anderson. Jared Dix of Echoes and Dust described Norther as Ex-Easter Island Head’s most immediate and immersive album, noting the band's increased dynamism and drawing comparisons to both academic precision and the raw, flowing energy of natural forces. Writing for Sleeping Shaman, Domenico Caccamo described Norther as "the album intended to bring to life diverse, timeless and magnificent atmospheres that transport you to landscapes of enlightened, stratospheric beauty," and brought up comparisons to the works of Vini Reilly of The Durutti Column and Charles Hayward of This Heat.

=== Accolades ===
Norther appeared on several year-end lists in 2024. The Quietus ranked it as their Album of the Year 2024, with Jakub Knera describing it as "attaining exceptional levels of sensitivity combined with fractious arrangement in order to showcase emotional beauty in a post-minimalist way." The publication highlighted the band's use of "single and simple patterns repeated ad infinitum" to create "highly developed suites," as well as their approach to the electric guitar that "demonstrates the incredible beauty and possibilities of the instrument stripped of its rock ethos."

Loud and Quiet ranked the album fourth in its annual list, with Jake Crossland describing it as "a perfect suite of spells" and noting its ability to "find a delicate and emotive beauty amongst [its] minimalist compositions."

Musician Kevin Martin ranked the album 7th in his year-end list for Boomkat.com. The sound project Cities and Memory listed it at number 19 in their Albums of the Year rankings, while Liverpool-based site Sun 13 placed it at number 41.

The album was also listed among the best experimental and avant-garde releases of the year by Far Out and Treble. Far Out described it as "a record that can only accurately be compared to itself," while Treble stated that it "defies categorization not by embracing dissonance but harmony—a work that feels warm and unexpectedly beautiful, open to limitless possibilities."

Canada's Met Radio included it in their selection of "Top 10 Albums You May Have Missed in 2024", with Kyle Sikorski noting its unique approach to guitar instrumentation and minimalist composition.

Accolades for Norther
Publication	Accolade	Rank	Ref.
Boomkat.com	Kevin Martin 2024	7	
Cities and Memory	Albums of the Year 2024	19	
Far Out	The 10 best avant-garde albums from 2024	N/A	
Loud and Quiet	Albums of the Year 2024	4	
Met Radio	Kyle's Top 10 Albums You May Have Missed in 2024	N/A	
Prog	Critics' lists 2024: Jeremy Allen (Writer)	2	
The Quietus	Albums of the Year 2024	1	
Sun 13	Top 50 Albums of 2024	41	
Treble	The 20 Best Experimental Albums of 2024	N/A	

The title track, 'Norther', was featured among The Sampler's favourite singles of 2024 on Radio New Zealand. The closing track, 'Lodestone', was included in The Freak Zone's best of 2024 by BBC Radio 6's Stuart Maconie.

== Track listing ==
All tracks are written by Ex-Easter Island Head.

No.	Title	Length
1.	"Weather"	9:45
2.	"Norther"	6:38
3.	"Easter"	3:44
4.	"Magnetic Language"	5:33
5.	"Golden Bridges"	4:50
6.	"Lodestone"	7:08
Total length:		37:38

== Personnel ==
The credits are sourced from the press release, vinyl cover, and the band's profile in Prog magazine.

Ex-Easter Island Head

- Benjamin D. Duvall – guitars, percussion, synths, gadgets
- Benjamin Fair – guitars, percussion, synths, gadgets
- Andrew PM Hunt – guitars, percussion, synths, gadgets, production, mixing
- Jonathan Hering – guitars, percussion, synths, gadgets

Technical

- Stephan Mathieu – mastering
- Chris Reeder – sleeve design
