= Large Electric Ensemble =

Studio album by Ex-Easter Island Head
- Released: 20 January 2014
- Recorded: March 2013
- Studio: Paper Stone (Nottingham, UK)
- Genre: Minimalism; no wave
- Length: 34:13
- Label: Low Point
- Producer: James Rand (additional production)

Ex-Easter Island Head chronology
| Mallet Guitars Three (2013) | Large Electric Ensemble (2014) | Twenty-Two Strings (2016) |

Large Electric Ensemble is a studio album by English minimalist ensemble Ex-Easter Island Head, based in Liverpool. Following a trio of Mallet Guitars records that explored using tabletop guitars as percussive instruments, this album marks the group's first composition for massed electric guitars and drums, and is written by core members Benjamin D. Duvall, George Maund, and Jacob Chabeaux. Originally commissioned for the inaugural World Event Young Artists (WEYA) festival, held in Nottingham, UK, in September 2012, the piece was executed in collaboration with an ensemble of Nottingham-based guitarists. Following its premiere at WEYA, the work was further refined and recorded live in March 2013 at Paper Stone Studios in Nottingham. The album was released by Low Point on 20 January 2014.

Departing from the group's earlier use of tabletop guitars, the work features prepared guitars played in a conventional position, as depicted on the album cover. It employs extended techniques such as third-bridge preparation—where metal rods are inserted beneath the strings—and a variety of alternate tunings across the ensemble. A full drum kit, performed exclusively by Jacob Chabeaux, further anchors the instrumentation. Reflecting on the shift in scale and approach, Duvall described the project as "a totally different, maximal kind of approach to how we normally work."

While Ex-Easter Island Head have not returned to the massed ensemble format on later releases, their work in that context led to the formation of the Salford Large Electric Ensemble in 2017 and the Odense Large Ensemble in 2019—live-only offshoots featuring different line-ups and instrumental arrangements. As with the original Nottingham ensemble in 2014, the Salford ensemble performed at Supersonic Festival in 2017.

== Reception ==
Professional ratings
Review scores
| Source | Rating |
|---|---|
| Norman Records | 4.5/5 stars |

Large Electric Ensemble received positive reviews. Music critic Ben Ratliff, writing for The New York Times, noted that the group's sound was grounded in rhythm and rich in microtonal detail, adding that it made sense for such music to grow in scale. He also said: "It's got clear roots in the churning pulses, alternate tunings and dense harmonic worlds of Glenn Branca's symphonies, but in other parts, it’s also got some of Slint's dynamic, splintered riffs, and in the second movement, slow and steady cymbal washes and an immersion in the subtle, chiming, quiet mass: all the strings being heard at once."

Nick Southgate of The Wire described the album as an "essential release for both group and label." Commenting on the first two movements, he wrote: "The first of four movements opens the sound out and gives a more conventional role to rhythm than their previous work, recalling Glenn Branca for the first time. In contrast, the second seeps up from a shimmer of agitated strings to a glistening mass of accidental arpeggios." On the final two movements, he noted a return to the group's more familiar style: "The third has precise, pulsing guitar parts undercut by contrapuntal chords. The fourth is a ticking skitter of jangling harmonics created by adding a third bridge to the instruments. This is funnelled into a spellbinding crescendo to the whole piece."

Norman Records awarded the album 9/10, calling it a "superb record" and praising its "patient and methodical" compositions built on "hypnotic repetition". Noting the group’s shift from prepared mallet guitar works to a large ensemble format, the review placed Large Electric Ensemble in the tradition of large-scale guitar ensembles, stating: "This isn't grandiose like Chatham or antisocial like Branca or ecstatic like [Peter James] Taylor, though." Instead, it was described as "swirling otherworldly multi-guitar stuff", with early movements that are "dreamy and hypnotic", and a final passage in which "the thrum of guitars becomes ever more intense".

Paul Klotschkow, music editor at Nottingham's LeftLion, praised Large Electric Ensemble as a "superbly realised piece of music that doesn't forsake experimentation for enjoyability". Having first experienced the album live, he noted that the recording captures the energy of the live performance and described it as a collaboration with "eleven of Nottingham's finest guitarists".

Liverpool music magazine Bido Lito! described the album as "the climax to a Shakespearean battle scene," calling it "spontaneous and weighty yet euphoric and dark," with layers of strings and drums creating a dramatic and immersive sound.

Michael Holland of Ears For Eyes described the album as "lushly realised and rich in reverberating overtones," comparing the ensemble's approach to Sonic Youth, "Glenn Branca at his least bilious," and "Steve Reich at his most entrancing." He noted contrasts between ambient and rhythmically driven movements, highlighting the "intricate adrenal rush" of communal music-making. Jordan Volz of Fragile or Possibly Extinct called it a "highly textured and dense sonic experience," structured across four movements encompassing "chaotic drone, hypnotic chords, and time-bending compositions." He drew comparisons to Rhys Chatham, Steve Reich, the more restrained output of Kayo Dot, and artists associated with the Thrill Jockey label. Finally, Dave Fleet of Darkfloor observed that the album's expanded instrumentation brought "a much richer texture" and likened its restrained, repetition-based approach to krautrock.

Large Electric Ensemble was shortlisted for the Neptune Prize in 2014—Drowned in Sound's alternative to the Mercury Prize, created to recognise British albums they felt had been overlooked by mainstream awards. That year's prize went to indie pop band Woman's Hour. Describing the album, Drowned in Sound wrote: "this not-quite-ambient, not-quite-drone, not-really-classed-as-modern-classical record... has had a lot of love from our forum members. It's gorgeous." The album was also placed 41st on Norman Records' year-end list and earned the group a second nomination for Liverpool's GIT Award, which ultimately went to experimental dub producer Forest Swords.

== Track listing ==
All tracks are written by Jacob Chabeaux, Benjamin D. Duvall, and George Maund.

| No. | Title | Length |
|---|---|---|
| 1. | "First Movement" | 5:06 |
| 2. | "Second Movement" | 13:05 |
| 3. | "Third Movement" | 5:29 |
| 4. | "Fourth Movement" | 10:32 |
| Total length: | | 34:13 |

== Personnel ==
Large Electric Ensemble

- Ex-Easter Island Head:
  - Jacob Chabeaux – drums
  - Benjamin D. Duvall – prepared guitar
  - George Maund – prepared guitar
- Additional guitarists:
  - Sarah Baily
  - Katharine Eira Brown
  - James Finlay
  - Matthew Fleetwood
  - Gareth Hardwick
  - Jonathan Hering
  - Neil Johnson
  - Graham Langley
  - Dan Layton
  - Mark Lowman
  - David Stockwell
  - Chris Summerlin

Technical

- James Rand – mixing, additional production
- Chris Summerlin – cover design
