= Étude Op. 25, No. 1 (Chopin) =

Composition for piano by Frédéric Chopin

Étude Op. 25, No. 1 in A♭ major is a solo piano work composed by Frédéric Chopin in 1836, and published in 1837. The work consists entirely of rapid arpeggios and harmonic modulations based on A♭ major.

Robert Schumann praised this work in a dissertation on the Études; calling it "a poem rather than a study", he coined for it the alternate name "Aeolian Harp". It is also sometimes known as "The Shepherd Boy," following an unsupported tale by Kleczyński that Chopin advised a pupil to picture a shepherd boy taking refuge in a grotto to avoid a storm playing the melody on his flute.

== Structure ==
First measures of Chopin's Étude Op. 25, No. 1. (Urtext edition).

This étude comprises a right-hand melody and supportive bass line, the accompaniment consisting of broken chords, provided by the inner voices of both hands, usually in semiquaver-tuplets. The left hand introduces polyrhythms from time to time. The principal melody is presented by the right hand on the first note of each group of sextuplets, with occasional counter-melodies provided by the inner voices.

The distinctive theme is presented in A♭ major. Through metamorphic modulations to closely related keys, it eventually arrives at a brief episode in the remote key of A major, but culminates with an intense climax in the home key, and a momentary reference to the original thematic material, which flows easily into the coda.

== Technique ==
Étude Op. 25, No. 1
Martha Goldstein playing on an Erard (1851) - 2574KB

Étude Op. 25, No. 1
Performed by Donald Betts

Technically, the piece requires dexterity to play the sextuplets fast enough, and to be able to move the hand across intervals as large as a 13th in the middle. The inner voice figures consist of repeated figures of arpeggiated chords. Schumann commented on Chopin's subtle emphasis on certain melodies throughout this piece. One difficulty the étude presents is the voicing of the inner counter-melodies. The three annotated studies by Leopold Godowsky on this etude exploit this aspect of this piece and also introduce the student to further possibilities in the Chopin original.
