= Twenty-Two Strings =

2016 album by Ex-Easter Island Head

Studio album by Ex-Easter Island Head
- Released: 5 August 2016
- Studio: Parr Street Studio 2 (Liverpool, UK)
- Genre: Minimalism; gamelan; process music
- Length: 36:21
- Label: Low Point
- Producer: James Rand

Ex-Easter Island Head chronology
Large Electric Ensemble (2014)	Twenty-Two Strings (2016)	Norther (2024)

Twenty-Two Strings is the fifth studio album by English minimalist ensemble Ex-Easter Island Head, released on 12 August 2016 by Low Point. It was recorded at Parr Street Studio 2 in Liverpool and features the group as a trio of Benjamin Duvall, Jonathan Hering, and Benjamin Fair, who joined the group during the period leading up to the recording.

According to Duvall, the album "is taking everything [the group] ha[s] done so far and putting it in one place." The album title, Twenty-Two Strings, refers to the total number of strings across four electric guitars and one bass guitar, as depicted on the album cover. Track titles draw attention to the different preparations and instruments used across the record.

The album received positive critical reviews and gained endorsement from Stewart Lee and James Holden, who, as festival curators, invited the ensemble to perform at All Tomorrow's Parties in 2016 and Le Guess Who? in 2017, respectively.

== Background and recording ==
The album draws on seven years of compositional development, incorporating approaches from Mallet Guitars, Large Electric Ensemble, and the group's tape-based work. It reflects a deliberate balance between drone and rhythm, with a conscious effort to separate what the group describes as "the fundamentals of our sound," which are often intertwined in their earlier use of prepared tabletop guitars as percussion instruments.

As in previous works, the group draws influence from Indonesian gamelan ensembles, particularly the idea that instruments within each ensemble are tuned to one another sympathetically and cannot be interchanged with those from other ensembles. This concept informs their approach to creating what they describe as "a sound world of our own." Although this method may reduce emphasis on melody, it contributes to a cohesive structural identity, with instruments such as guitars, drums, cowbells, and bells tuned in relation to one another. The band's full setup, including tabletop guitars arranged across two tables and a full drum kit, was featured on the cover of the Liverpool music magazine Bido Lito!.

The first section of the album, up to 'Twenty-Two Strings', consists of pieces that run concurrently into each other and present some of the most compositional density in the group's discography to date. This contrasts with the "slow accessibility" pursued by the group on previous recordings.

Within this section, the rhythmic structure of 'Sixteen Snares' is based on the cowbell pattern from 'Ten Bells', redistributed across the ensemble and played at a different tempo. The piece functions as both a form of process music and a composed development, restating and transforming a theme introduced earlier in the work.

'Twenty-Two Strings' presents a moment of release following the preceding compositional density. According to the group, "It's certainly the most patient thing we've done." This piece allows the recording to "really open up and loosen rhythmically."

'Six Sticks' is a re-arrangement of 'Fourth Movement' from Large Electric Ensemble (2014), intended to conclude the album with renewed momentum. As one of the album's simplest sections, it brings the record to an emotionally charged closing piece.

== Release and promotion ==
The album was announced on 17 July 2016 via the group's website. It was officially released on 5 August 2016, followed by launch performances at Liverpool's Philharmonic Music Rooms and London's Iklectik Art Lab. Music videos for 'Six Sticks', 'Twenty-Two Strings', and 'Sixteen Snares' were gradually released following the album's release.

Tracks from Twenty-Two Strings received airplay on WNYC and BBC Radio, including on BBC Radio 3's Exposure and Night Tracks, and BBC Radio 6 Music's Freak Zone.

=== All Tomorrow's Parties 2016 ===
Prior to release, Ex-Easter Island Head were invited to perform at the 2016 edition of All Tomorrow's Parties in Prestatyn, North East Wales, as part of a section curated by comedian and free jazz fan Stewart Lee. Introducing his curatorial vision in The Guardian, Lee described his preparations as "undress[ing], lay[ing] on the floor, and attempt[ing] to visualise the whole history of human sound to a rhythm only [he] could hear."

"Curating" myself into a visionary state, I saw the Prestatyn event as a pyramid-shaped sonic universe with new acts like Shopping, Trash Kit and Ex-Easter Island Head orbiting its tip, unfamiliar free jazz and folk artists floating in random gyratories, and the whole thing balanced on the back of a huge four-legged turtle, the legs representing musicians whose works are supporting pillars of postwar contemporary music; John Cale; (Note: John Cale's performance was subsequently cancelled.) The 13th Floor Elevators; Sun Ra Arkestra; and Giant Sand, wellspring of alt-country. A mysterious fifth vestigial leg is in the form of the proto-alternative comedian Ted Chippington, though its exact function is uncertain. This, my friends, is what "curating" means.

— Stewart Lee on curating the program at All Tomorrow's Parties 2016

The group's performance at All Tomorrow's Parties on 17 June 2016 was well received. Daniel Dylan Wray of The Independent described it as "a rousing early highlight," noting that "their neo-classical take on Glenn Branca-esque minimalism crept from contained ambience to euphoric expulsions." Writing for The Guardian, JR Moores characterised the group's sound as "crashing Sonic Youth-meets-Liars no-wave instrumentals," and observed that their "supposedly niche" music was met with enthusiastic audience reception. Paul Gigham, writing for Getintothis, noted that, in addition to a "triumphant, packed-out and rapturously received impromptu performance on Friday evening," the group also gave a guerrilla performance "on the balcony outside their chalet [in the holiday park]" on Sunday lunchtime. As word spread, a growing crowd gathered, creating what Gigham described as "a welcome moment of genuine magic," reminiscent of the spontaneous performances that characterised earlier editions of All Tomorrow’s Parties.

=== Church of Sound ===
On 23 October 2016, Ex-Easter Island Head performed at an event curated by Church of Sound at St James the Great Church in Clapton, London. Initially organised following an invitation to host the LSO's Community Gamelan Group, the event was billed as "an evening of shimmering counterpoints, panethnical polyrythms and esoteric visions" with the addition of James Holden and Ex-Easter Island Head to the programme. Holden, alongside percussionist Camilo Tirado, performed Outdoor Museum of Fractals, a minimalist piece commissioned by The Barbican and Muziekgebouw to commemorate the 80th birthday of Terry Riley.

The sold out event was filmed and broadcast live by NTS Radio. World music website Rhythm Passport referred to the group as "masters of experimentation... creating rhythmic, minimalist, melodic suites beyond imagination", and celebrated their "highly choreographic and perfectly synchronised" performance.

=== Le Guess Who? 2017 ===
After sharing the stage at Church of Sound, James Holden invited Ex-Easter Island Head to perform at the 2017 edition of the Le Guess Who? festival in Utrecht, the Netherlands, as part of his curated programme. Describing his approach, Holden said, "the whole idea of the curation was trance music that isn't trance," bringing together diverse artists known for their immersive, hypnotic sounds, often rooted in spiritual and folk traditions. The program featured James Holden and the Animal Spirits, Jerusalem in My Heart, Shabaka and the Ancestors, Maâlem Mahmoud Guinia & Band, and Mario Batkovic. On selecting Ex-Easter Island Head, he described them as "making their own folk culture," suggesting they were forging a distinctive, self-contained musical language.

On 11 November 2017, Ex-Easter Island Head performed at TivoliVredenburg's Hertz hall alongside Colin Benders & Maarten Vos (Note: They stepped in for Lichens, who was unable to perform due to a cancelled flight.) and XAM Duo. Reviewing the group's performance, Red Bull Turkey's Zülâl Kalkandelen remarked that she was "carried away by the rhythmic harmony [the group] created." Similarly, Tallah Brash of The Skinny praised the group's finale, describing it as "sounded bloody great."

== Reception ==
Professional ratings
Review scores
Source	Rating
NARC.	5/5 stars
Record Collector	4/5 stars
The Skinny	4/5 stars

Twenty-Two Strings received positive reviews. In a five-star review for the independent music magazine NARC. magazine, Lee Fisher described Twenty-Two Strings as a distinctive and immersive listen, noting that the group have "developed a sound which is genuinely distinctive and essential." He characterised the album as "more focused and intimate but no less affecting" compared to its predecessor, Large Electric Ensemble, highlighting the group's progression over several years and multiple releases.

Writing for Record Collector, Mike Goldsmith gave the album four out of five stars. He described 'Four Guitars' as a "two-minute redux" of the group's early Mallet Guitars releases, delivering "all portentous ringing and pretty much what you'd expect." From there, however, the album explores "new sonic territory" with a "brighter" sound. 'Ten Bells' is a "new age rhythmic delight," shifting from "hypnotic Laraaji patterns" to a "full-on 250BPM banger." 'Two Coins' offers a "shimmering" ambient gamelan feel before leading into 'Sixteen Snares,' where a "melancholy undertow" hints at post-rock without fully embracing it. The album stays "relatively mellow" until 'Six Sticks' delivers a "propulsive motorik groove" reminiscent of early Battles, with an unexpectedly "funky" energy. More "accessible, joyous, and fun" than past work, Twenty-Two Strings remains "no less experimental or complex," marking an evolution of the group's sound.

In another four-out-of-five review, Gary Kaill of The Skinny described Twenty-Two Strings as an album that, despite the group's "tiny toolbox," showcases "vast ambition" through minimalist yet intricate compositions. 'Four Guitars' sets an "austere tone" with "ringing chords, a stark rim shot keeping time, [and] a four-note motif with the fourth played on the off-beat," creating something "unsettling, mesmerising" and "very beautiful." 'Two Coins' "jitters and twitches" before slipping "almost unnoticed into 'Sixteen Snares': a heart-stopping segue." The "near-formless, epic" title track offers "blessed relief amidst the tumult" before 'Six Sticks' builds to a "heady, euphoric climax." With "seven tracks and a million and one ideas," Twenty-Two Strings is praised for balancing "textural and narrative invention," making it "anything but a by-the-numbers exercise."

Anecdotally, the album attracted attention beyond traditional music criticism. On 31 August 2019, comic book writer Warren Ellis shared a recording of 'Ten Bells' on his website, writing, "I’ve had the record TWENTY-TWO STRINGS in my queue forever, and just got around to having a listen. This track is giving me life today. So you can have life too."

In November 2021, comedian and writer Bridget Christie featured Twenty-Two Strings in her cultural highlights for The Guardian, saying she loves running to 'Six Sticks': "I play it on my last lap of the park. It gives me that final push I need." Reflecting on the group's Edinburgh Fringe show, she highlighted their choreographed precision, likening it to "watching a penguin carry its egg: everything they do is so deliberate and measured, from the slowly raising and lowering of a hand, to the precise, delicate ring of a bell."

== Track listing ==
All tracks are written by Ex-Easter Island Head..

No.	Title	Length
1.	"Four Guitars"	2:24
2.	"Ten Bells"	3:40
3.	"Two Coins"	3:00
4.	"Sixteen Snares"	5:21
5.	"Twenty-Two Strings"	9:34
6.	"Eight Bridges"	6:48
7.	"Six Sticks"	5:31
Total length:		36:21

== Personnel ==
Ex-Easter Island Head

- Benjamin D. Duvall – guitars, percussion
- Benjamin Fair – guitars, percussion
- Jonathan Hering – guitars, percussion

Technical

- Taylor Deupree – mastering
- James Rand – producer, mixing engineer
- Chris Taylor – recording
- Benedict Morgan – artwork design
