= Lucille Wallenrod =

American painter

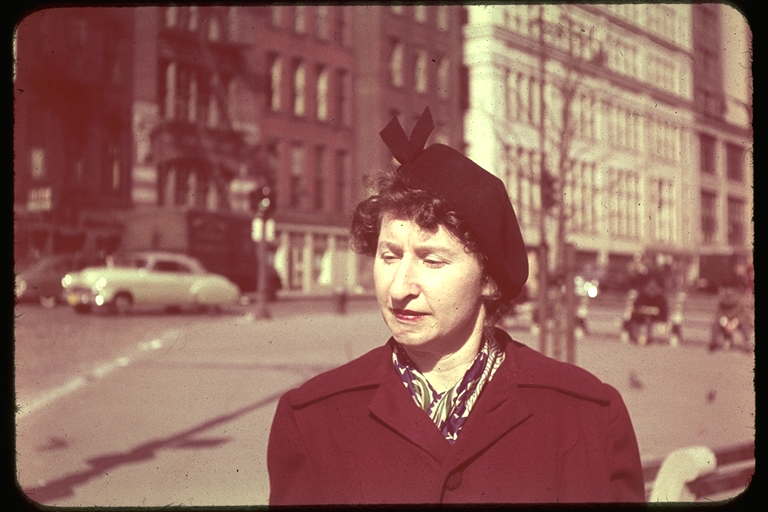
- Lucille Wallenrod in New York City, early 1950s
- Born: October 4, 1918; Brooklyn, New York, U.S.
- Died: October 5, 1998; Ridge, New York
- Other names: Lucille Wallenrod-Dreyblatt, Lucille W. Dreyblatt
- Occupation: Artist
- Spouse: Gerald Dreyblatt
- Children: Arnold Dreyblatt

Lucille Wallenrod, also known as Lucille Wallenrod-Dreyblatt, (October 4, 1918 – October 5, 1998) was an American artist. She was active in Long Island, New York from 1939 until the 1990s.

== Early life and education ==
Lucille Wallenrod was born in Brooklyn, New York, and grew up in Freeport, Long Island, New York, the daughter of Philip Wallenrod and Anna Kaplan Wallenrod. Her parents were immigrants from Russia. Wallenrod was born with cerebral palsy.

She studied at the W.P.A. Art Class (1939), Nassau Art League (1940), the American Artists School (1942), and at the Art Students League of New York (1943). She had studied with painter Sol Wilson at Art Students League of New York.

== Career ==
Because Wallenrod had cerebral palsy, she painted with a special arm brace of her own design. She painted dramatic expressionist seascapes with broad strokes and deep, vivid colors, as well as still lifes and portraits. Wallenrod had her first solo exhibition at the Roko Gallery (1946) and then belonged for many years to the Charles Barzansky Gallery, both in New York City. She also participated in numerous group exhibitions in the late forties until the early nineteen sixties.

She won a number of competitions, most notably the first prize in the National Art Contest sponsored by President Eisenhower's Committee on the Handicapped in 1956, for her "Ships at Bay". Judges for this competition were Isabel Bishop, Frank J. Reilly, and Andrew Wyeth. The prize was $1000, and her painting was exhibited with other finalists across the United States. Her work was often reviewed in New York and Long Island newspapers.

== Personal life ==
Wallenrod married Gerald Dreyblatt in 1947. They had a son, composer Arnold Dreyblatt. Due to a long terminal illness, Lucille Wallenrod's output waned in her later years, yet her interest and sensitivity for the arts never faltered. She died in Ridge, New York in 1998, the day after her 80th birthday. Her husband, Gerald Dreyblatt, died in Florida in 2008.

== Gallery ==
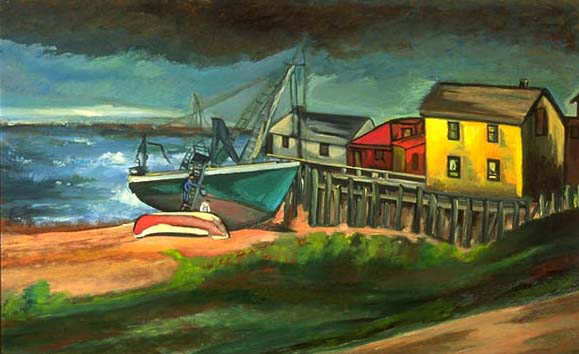
"Preparing for Sea", by Lucille Wallenrod, Oil

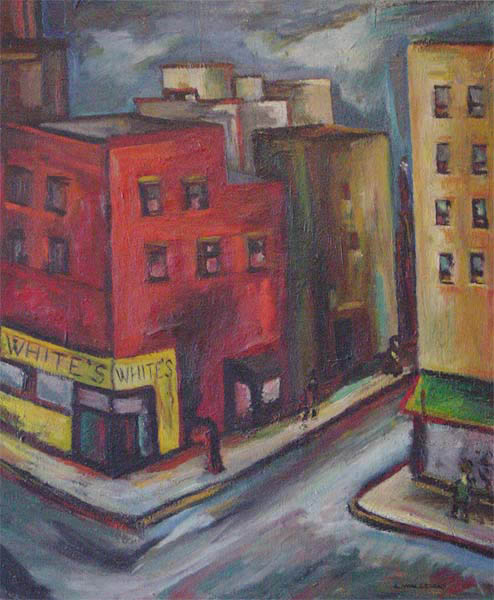
"Hillside Avenue", by Lucille Wallenrod, Oil

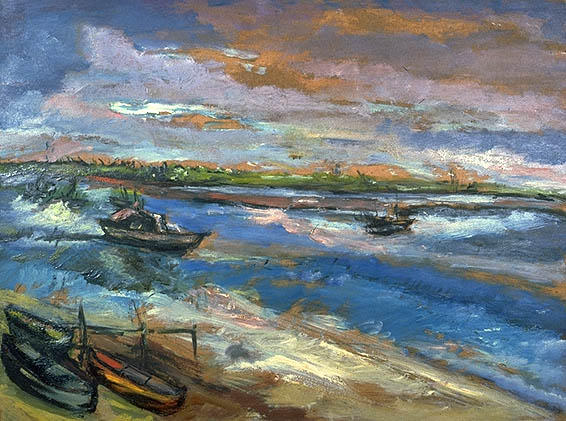
"At the Shore", by Lucille Wallenrod, Oil

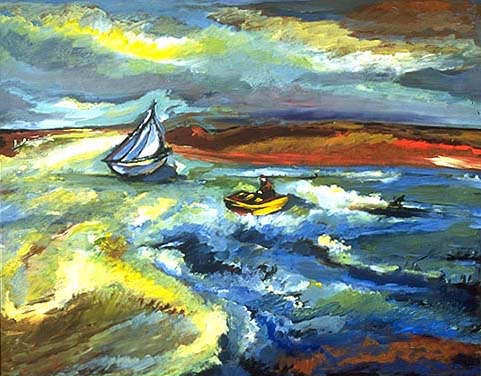
"Raging Sea", by Lucille Wallenrod, Oil

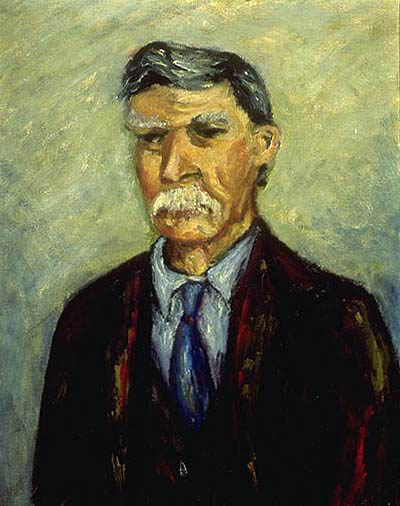
"Portrait of An Old Man", by Lucille Wallenrod, Oil

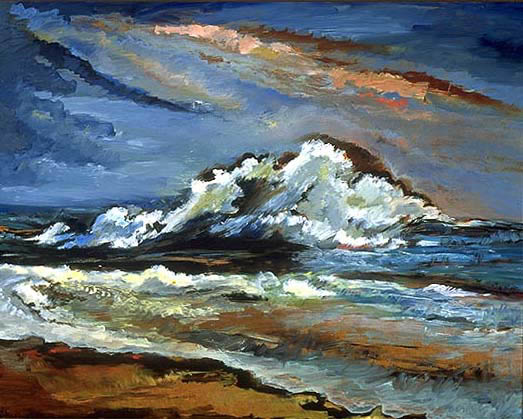
"Stormy Sea', by Lucille Wallenrod, Oil

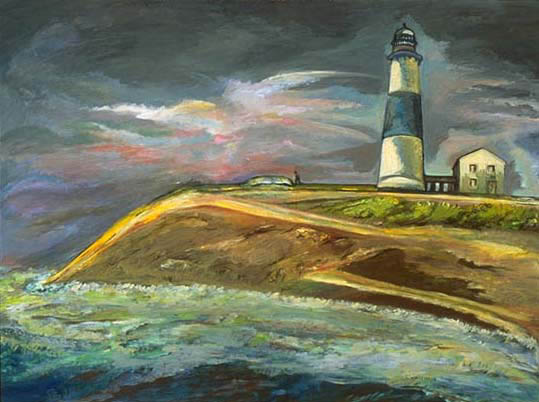
"Montauk Light", by Lucille Wallenrod, Oil

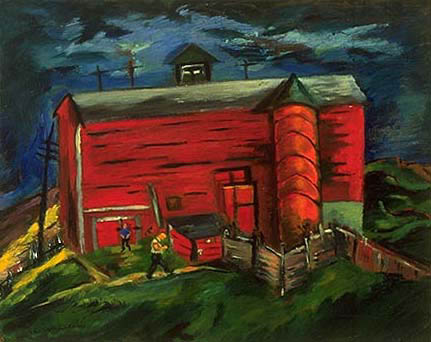
"The Red Barn", by Lucille Wallenrod, Oil

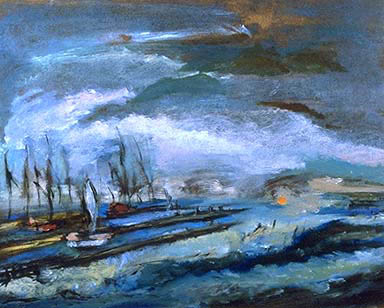
"Turbulent Waters", by Lucille Wallenrod, Oil

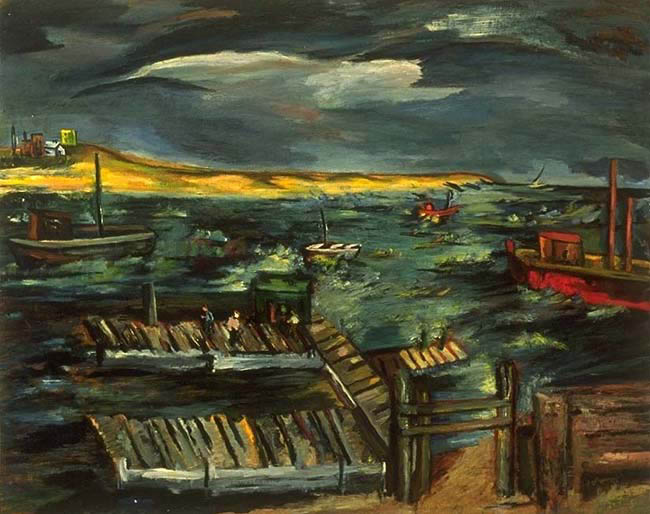
"Ships At Bay", by Lucille Wallenrod, Oil

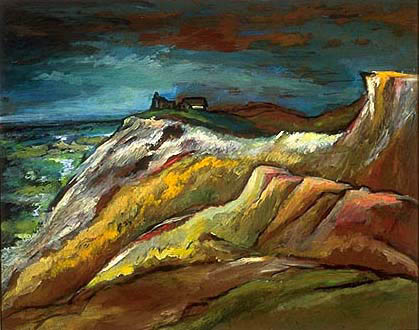
"Gay Head", by Lucille Wallenrod, Oil

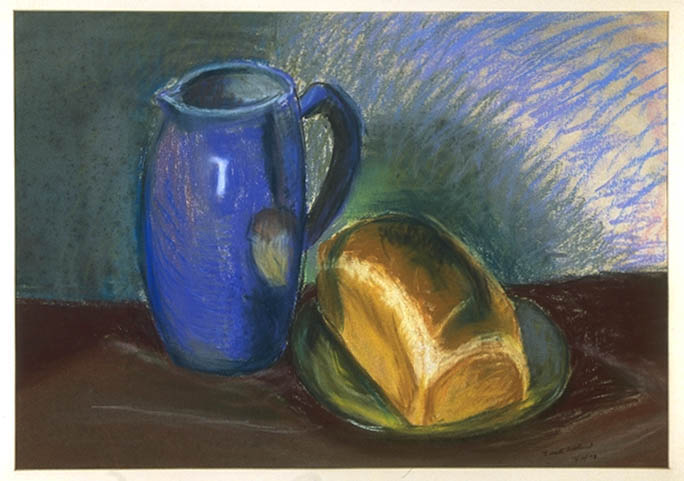
"Bread and Pitcher", by Lucille Wallenrod, Pastel

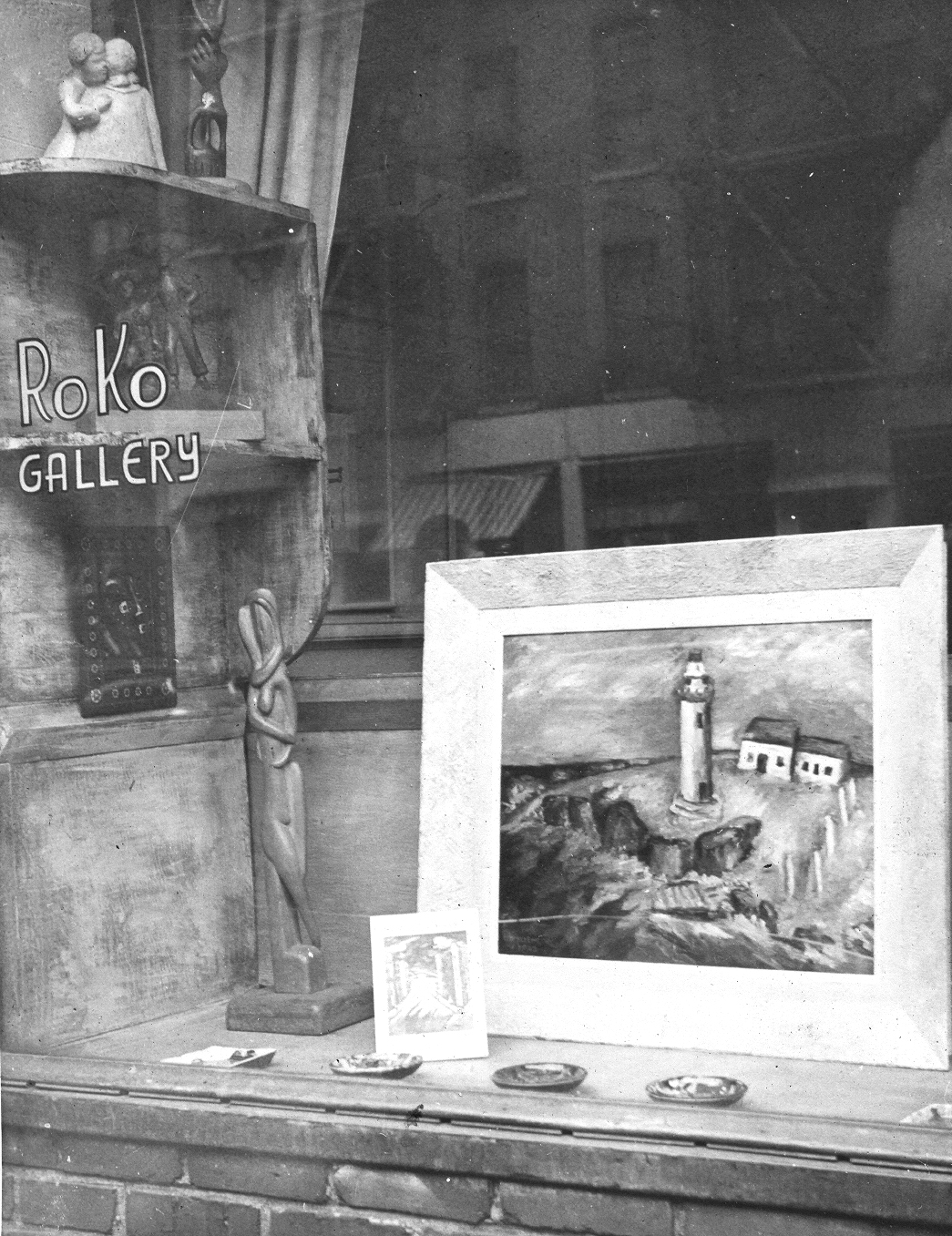
Exhibition by Lucille Wallenrod, Roko Gallery, New York, 1946

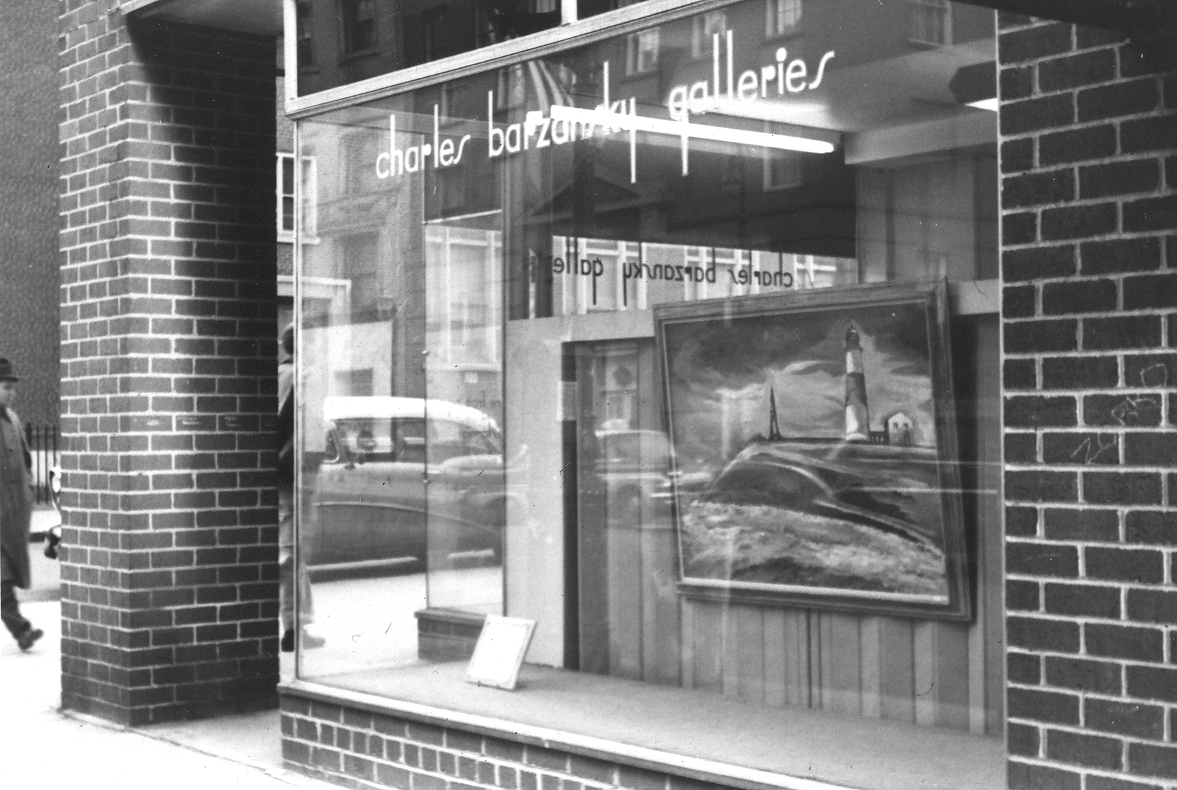
Exhibition by Lucille Wallenrod, Barzansky Gallery, New York, 1957

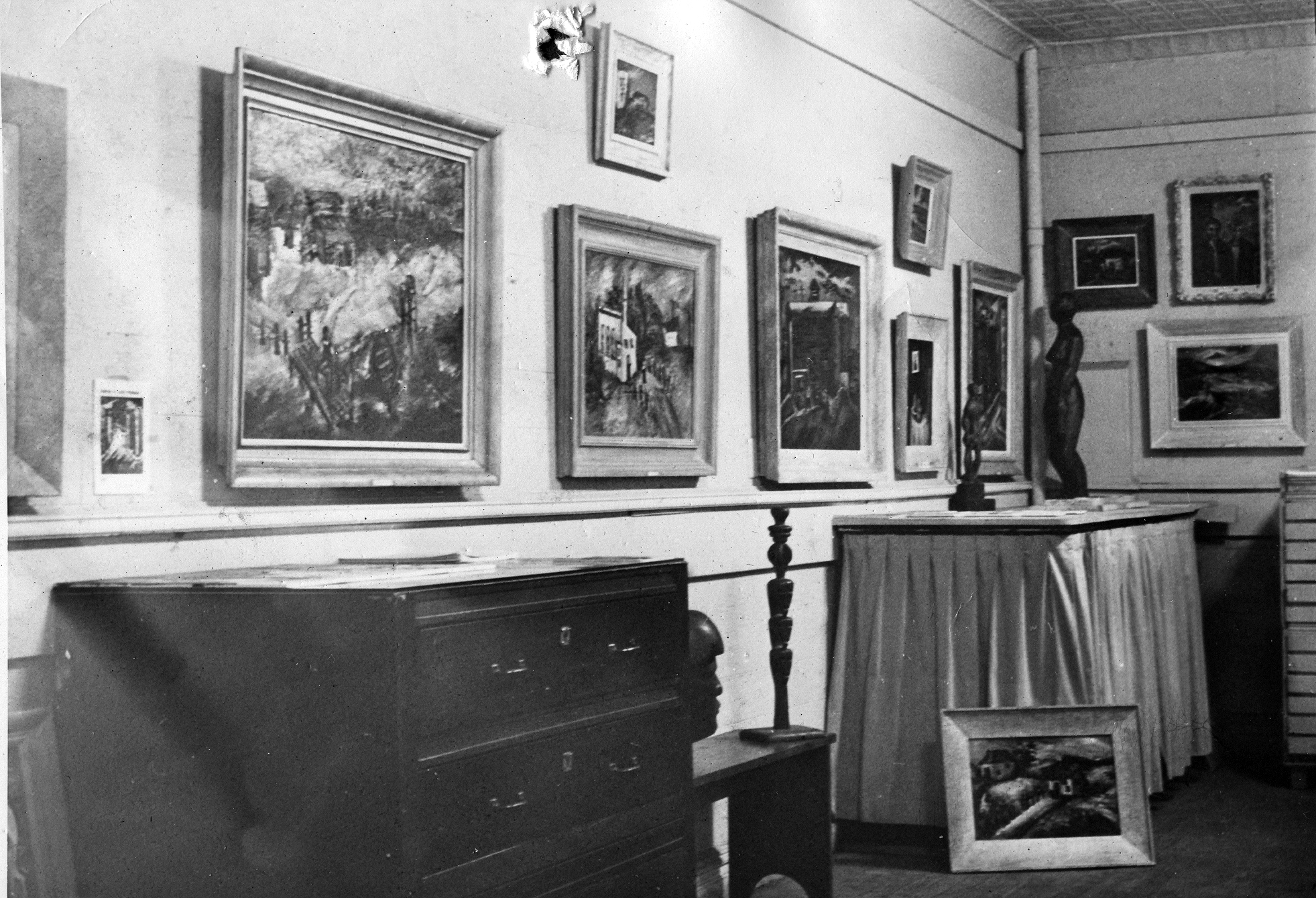
Exhibition by Lucille Wallenrod, Barzansky Gallery, New York, 1960

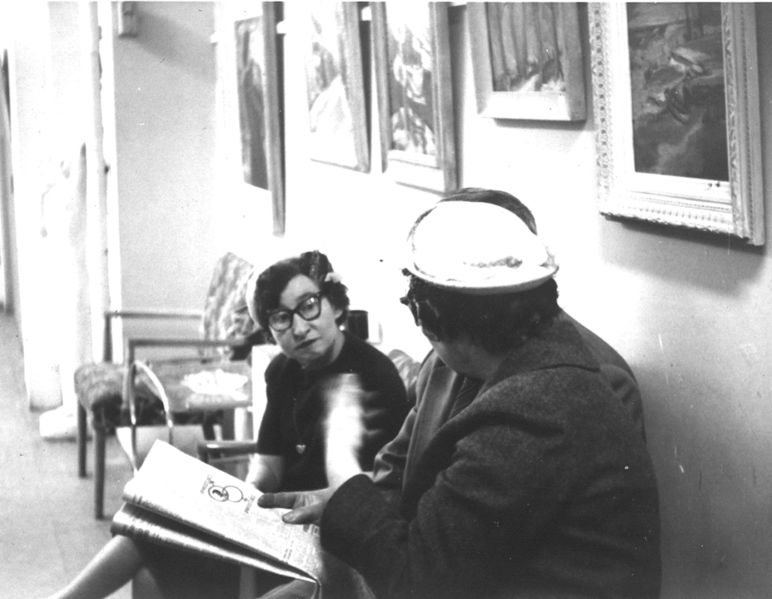
Lucille Wallenrod at Exhibition, Barzansky Gallery, New York, 1960
