= The Good Hope (novel) =

1964 novel by William Heinesen

- First edition
- Author: William Heinesen
- Original title: Det gode håb
- Translator: W. Glyn Jones
- Language: Danish
- Publisher: Gyldendal
- Publication date: 1964
- Publication place: Faroe Islands (Denmark)
- English publication date: 2011
- Pages: 245
- ISBN: 87-00-02674-3

The Good Hope (Danish: Det gode håb) is a 1964 novel by the Faroese writer William Heinesen, and set in 17th-century Tórshavn. It received the Nordic Council Literature Prize. Heinesen wrote in the Danish language, but his novels, including The Good Hope, were later translated into the Faroese language.

== See also ==
- 1964 in literature
- Faroese literature
