= William Heinesen =

Faroese author, composer and painter

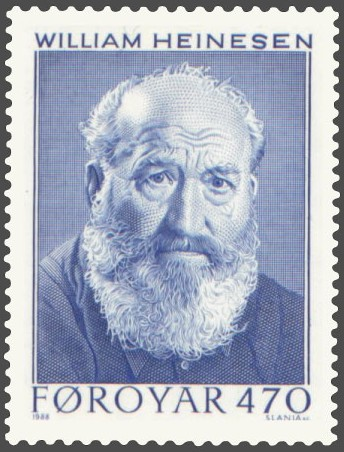
- Born: 15 January 1900; Tórshavn, Faroe Islands
- Died: 12 March 1991 (aged 91); Tórshavn, Faroe Islands
- Occupations: Poet, novelist, composer, artist
- Children: Zacharias Heinesen

Andreas William Heinesen (15 January 1900 – 12 March 1991) was a poet, writer, composer and painter from the Faroe Islands.

== His writing ==
The Faroese capital Tórshavn is always the centre of Heinesen's writing, and he is famous for having once called Tórshavn "The Navel of the World". His writing focuses on contrasts between darkness and light, between destruction and creativity. Then following is the existential struggle of man to take sides. This is not always easy, however, and the lines between good and bad are not always clearly defined.

Heinesen was captivated by the mysterious part of life, calling himself religious in the broadest sense of the word. His life could be described as a struggle against defeatism with one oft-quoted aphorism of his is that "life is not despair, and death shall not rule".

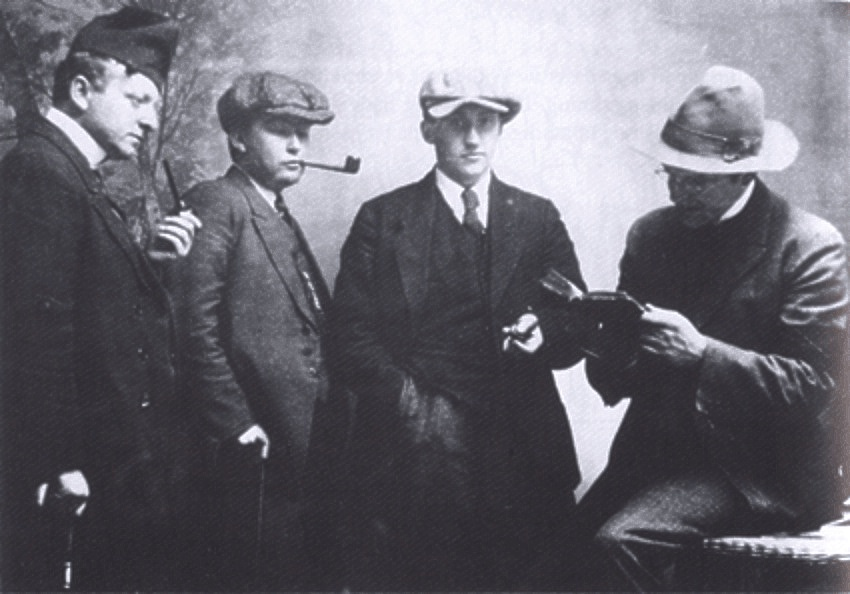
William Heinesen (second from right) with his friends and contemporaries Janus Djurhuus, Jørgen-Frantz Jacobsen, and Hans Andrias Djurhuus.

== Publications ==
As he was born and raised before the Faroese language was taught in the schools, he wrote mainly in Danish but his spoken language was Faroese. All his books were later translated into his native Faroese.

He published his first collection of poetry when he was 21 and he had three more published before he wrote his first novel Blæsende gry (Stormy Dawn) in 1934. He read every single one of the chapters to the painter Sámal Joensen-Mikines, as he was worried that his Danish was not good enough. That was followed up with Noatún (1938). Noatún has a strong political message – solidarity is the key to a good society. His next book The Black Cauldron (1949) deals with the aftermath of decadent living combined with religious hysteria. In The Lost Musicians (1950) Heinesen leaves the social realism of his earlier works behind, instead giving himself over to straightforward storytelling. Mother Pleiades (1952) is an ode to his imagination. Its subtitle is "a Story From the Beginning of Time".

Heinesen was not content with writing only novels. In the fifties he began writing short stories as well. Most of them have been printed in these three collections entitled The Enchanted Light, Gamaliel's Bewitchment and Cure Against Evil Spirits (1969). In the novel The Good Hope, his main character the Rev. Peder Børresen is based on the historical person Rev. Lucas Debes. When Heinesen was asked how long it had taken to write it, he answered "Forty years. But then I did other things in between."

== Recognition ==
He was awarded the Danish literary prize Holberg Medal in 1960.

He received The Nordic Council's Literature Prize in 1965 for his novel Det gode håb (The Good Hope), published in 1964. In the story Heinesen had the difficult task of reproducing 17th-century Danish. He succeeded, and won the prize. It is widely considered his best work.

When there were rumours that William Heinesen was about to receive the Nobel Prize for literature in 1981, he wrote to the Swedish Academy and renounced his candidacy. Later he explained why:

The Faroese language was once held in little regard – indeed it was suppressed outright. In spite of this, the Faroese language has created a great literature, and it would have been reasonable to give the Nobel Prize to an author who writes in Faroese. If it had been given to me, it would have gone to an author who writes in Danish, and in consequence Faroese efforts to create an independent culture would have been dealt a blow.

He was awarded with the Faroese Literature Prize in 1975.

In 1980 on his 80th birthday Heinesen was appointed "Tórshavn's Citizen of Honour" by his home town.

In 1980 he received the Danish Critics Prize for Literature (Kritikerprisen).

In 1984 he received the Children's Books Prize of Tórshavn City Council (Barnabókaheiðursløn Tórshavnar býráðs)

In 1985 he was awarded the Karen Blixen Medal from the Danish Academy.

In 1987 he was awarded the Swedish Academy Nordic Prize ("little Nobel").

== Bibliography ==
Information in this bibliography is taken from the Danish Literature Centre.

=== Poems ===
- Arktiske Elegier og andre Digte (Arctic Elegies and other Poems), Copenhagen 1921
- Høbjergningen ved Havet (Haymaking by the Sea), Copenhagen 1924
- Sange mod Vaardybet (Songs towards the Depths of Spring), Copenhagen 1927
- Stjernerne vaagner (The Stars Awaken), Copenhagen 1930
- Den dunkle Sol (The Dark Sun), Copenhagen 1936
- Digte i udvalg (Selected Poems), Copenhagen 1955
- Hymne og harmsang (Hymns and Songs of Indignation), Copenhagen 1961
- Panorama med regnbue (Panorama with Rainbow), Copenhagen 1972
- Vinterdrøm. Digte i udvalg 1920–30 (Winter Dream. Selected Poems 1920–30), Copenhagen 1983
- Samlede digte (Complete Poems), Copenhagen 1984
- Digte (Poems), Copenhagen 1990

=== Short story anthologies ===
- Det fortryllede lys (The Enchanted Light), Copenhagen 1957
- Gamaliels besættelse (Gamaliel Possessed), Copenhagen 1960
- Kur mod onde ånder (A Cure for Evil Spirits), Copenhagen 1967
- Don Juan fra Tranhuset (Don Juan from the Whale Oil Factory), Copenhagen 1970
- Fortællinger fra Thorshavn (Tales from Tórshavn), Copenhagen 1973
- Grylen og andre noveller (The Gryla and Other Stories), Copenhagen 1978
- Her skal danses (Let There Be Dancing), Copenhagen 1980
- Laterna magica (Laterna Magica), Copenhagen 1985
  - Laterna Magica. Fjord Press, 1987 - ISBN 0-940242-23-0

=== Novels ===
- Blæsende Gry (Windswept Dawn), Copenhagen 1934
  - Windswept Dawn. Dedalus, 2009 - ISBN 978-1-903517-78-9
- Noatun (Noatun), Copenhagen 1938
- Den sorte gryde (The Black Cauldron), Copenhagen 1949
  - The Black Cauldron. Dedalus, 2000 - ISBN 978-0-946626-97-7
- De fortabte spillemænd (The Lost Musicians), Copenhagen 1950
  - The Lost Musicians (translated by W. Glyn Jones), Dedalus, 2006 - ISBN 978-1-903517-50-5
- Moder Syvstjerne (The Kingdom of the Earth), Copenhagen 1952
  - Mother Pleiades Dedalus, 2011 - ISBN 978-1-907650-07-9
- Det gode håb (The Good Hope), Copenhagen 1964
  - The Good Hope Dedalus, 2011 - ISBN 978-1-903517-98-7
- Tårnet ved verdens ende (The Tower at the Edge of the World), Copenhagen 1976
  - The Tower at the Edge of the World Dedalus, 2018 - ISBN 978-1-910213-66-7

== Heinesen's art on stamps ==
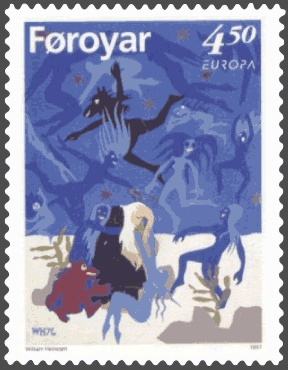
FR 309 of 1997: The Temptations of Saint Anthony.

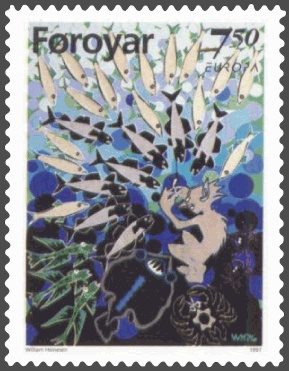
FR 310: FR Marmennil – The Little Merman.

== Other sources ==
- Hedin Brønner (1973) Three Faroese Novelists: An Appreciation of Jørgen-Frantz Jacobsen, William Heinesen, Heðin Brú (Ardent Media) ISBN 9780805733747
- Hazzard, Christinna. 2019. "Semi-Peripheral Realism: Nation and Form on the Borders of Europe." PhD Thesis, Liverpool John Moores University.
