= Cities and Memory =

Global sound art project

Cities and Memory is a global sound art and field recording project. It features more than 6,000 sounds from over 120 countries and territories. The project consists of a global map, on which each location features two sounds: the original field recording of the place, and a remixed version of that sound by a sound artist/composer. More than 1,600 sound artists from around the world have contributed to the project so far.

Founded in 2015 by Stuart Fowkes, the project has been featured in The Guardian, Bloomberg, BBC World Service, and The Atlantic. Every several months a specific theme is launched and sounds are collected and created around it; previous themes have included the sounds of the London Underground, nature, prayer, and outer space. A theme called 'Protest and Politics' came out in 2017 and "provide a snapshot into the politics of the last decade, and the ensuing responses".

In 2020, as a result of the COVID-19 pandemic, the project launched #StayHomeSounds which “aims to record how the sound of cities is dramatically changing during the Covid-19 outbreak".

In October 2022, Cities and Memory was one of the projects selected for the C40 World's Mayors Summit in Buenos Aires with the project Wellbeing Cities, which asked artists to reimagine a selection of field recordings from 36 countries around the world, to develop new compositions on the theme of sustainability, equity and wellbeing in cities.

A collaboration with the Helmholtz Institute for Functional Marine Biodiversity and the Alfred Wegener Institute resulted in the Polar Sounds project which captured calls from Ross seals, crabeater seals, minke whales, narwhals and humpback whales using underwater microphones, as well as re-imagined sounds by 150 artists .

The name Cities and Memory is inspired by Italian writer Italo Calvino's 1972 novel "Invisible Cities".
