= Ex-Easter Island Head =

English minimalist ensemble

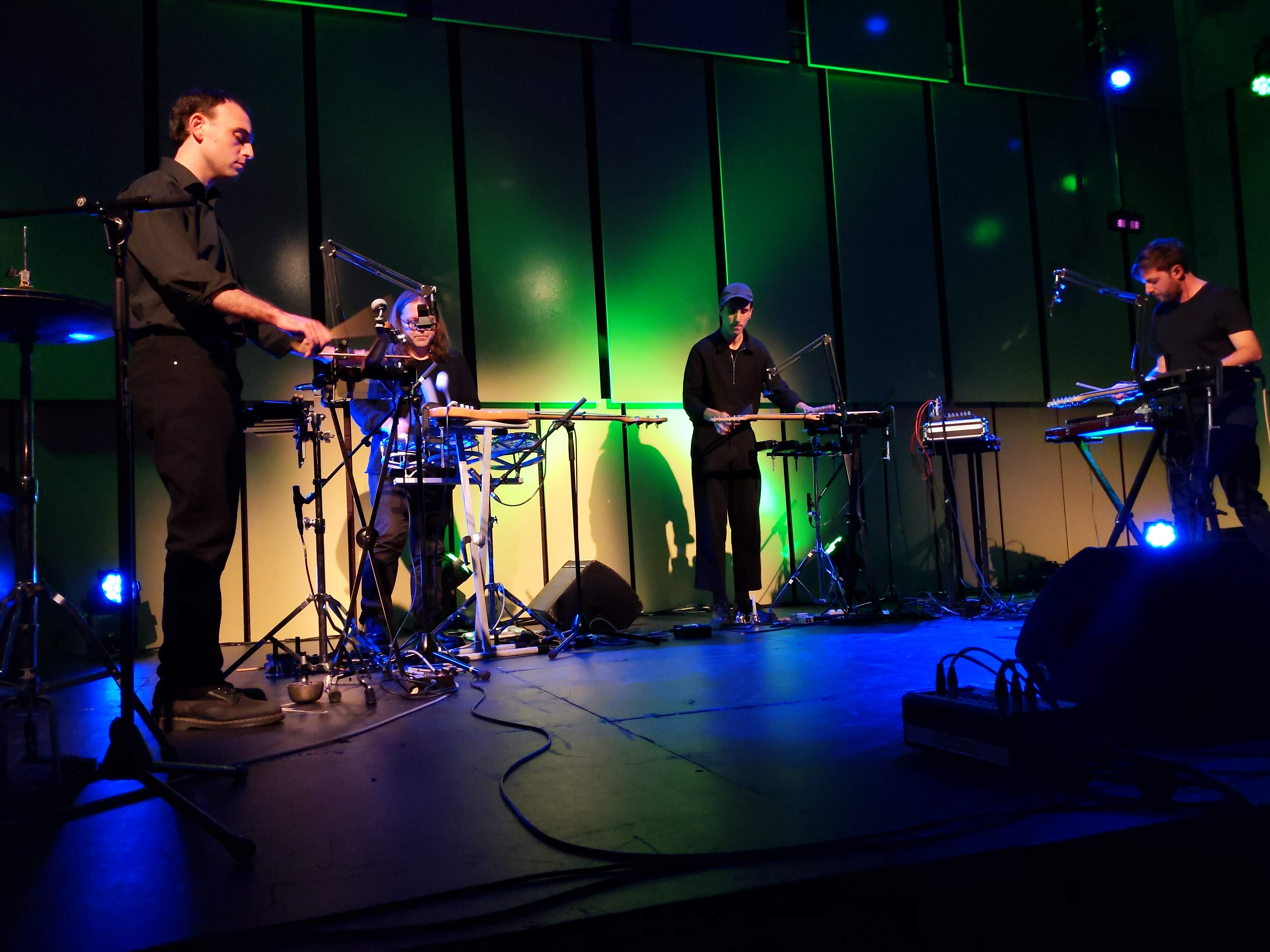
- The group playing live in Liverpool in 2021; from left to right: Hering, Fair, Hunt, Duvall

Background information
- Also known as: Ex-EIH, E-EIH, EEIH
- Origin: Liverpool, England
- Genres: Experimental; minimalism; no wave; gamelan; ambient; drone; process music
- Years active: 2009–present
- Labels: Rocket Recordings; Low Point; Tombed Visions; KPM Music
- Spinoffs: Whistling Arrow; The Aleph; Land Trance
- Members: Benjamin D. Duvall; Benjamin Fair; Jonathan Hering; Andrew PM Hunt
- Past members: George R. Maund; Jacob Chabeaux; Nicholas Hunt
- Website: exeasterislandhead.com

Ex-Easter Island Head (sometimes abbreviated as EEIH) is an English experimental music collective formed in Liverpool in 2009. Led by founding member Benjamin D. Duvall, the quartet currently includes Duvall, Benjamin Fair, Jonathan Hering, and Andrew PM Hunt. They perform instrumental music using prepared tabletop guitars—standard electric guitars modified and laid flat for percussive use—to explore rhythm, texture, and repetition through deliberately limited means.

The group began with a minimal setup involving two tabletop guitars and has gradually expanded its instrumentation while remaining focused on mechanical and percussive sound sources. Over time, they have incorporated additional preparations and playing techniques, maintaining an emphasis on hands-on, physical methods of sound production. This approach informs both their recorded output and live performances.

Their music draws on late 20th-century avant-garde traditions, particularly the repetitive structures of minimalism and the raw textures associated with no wave. These influences shaped the group's early identity as an ensemble focused on performing composed works. Over time, however, they shifted towards a more band-like format, placing greater emphasis on collective interplay and live performance. In discussing the group's approach, writer and comedian Stewart Lee described them as "experimental music presented as entertainment"—a remark that highlights the group's focus on making structurally ambitious music engaging and approachable, both in sound and in performance.

While remaining outside the mainstream, Ex-Easter Island Head has established a presence within experimental and alternative music circles. Their releases have featured on year-end lists in The Wire, The Quietus, and Loud and Quiet, and have received coverage in publications including Pitchfork, Uncut, and The Skinny. The group's live performances have been reviewed in The Independent and The Guardian, while Prog magazine described them as a "word-of-mouth sensation." In a 2024 feature, The Guardian wrote that the band had spent the past 15 years "making some of the boldest experiments in British music."

Their album Norther (2024) was placed at number one in The Quietus' Albums of the Year list. In 2025, the band contributed an interpretation of the track "Alone" to Mixes of a Lost World, a remix album by the Cure.

== Origin of the name ==
Ex-Easter Island Head was named by Benjamin Duvall, who stated it has no particular meaning, recalling in a 2012 interview with The Wire that he could not remember how he came up with it. He later added that he liked how the words looked written down and found the name unique.

However, in a 2013 interview with The Quietus, Duvall suggested that the name may have been subconsciously influenced by the band's exposure to South Pacific music, particularly the field recordings of ethnomusicologist David Fanshawe, who documented the region's musical traditions.

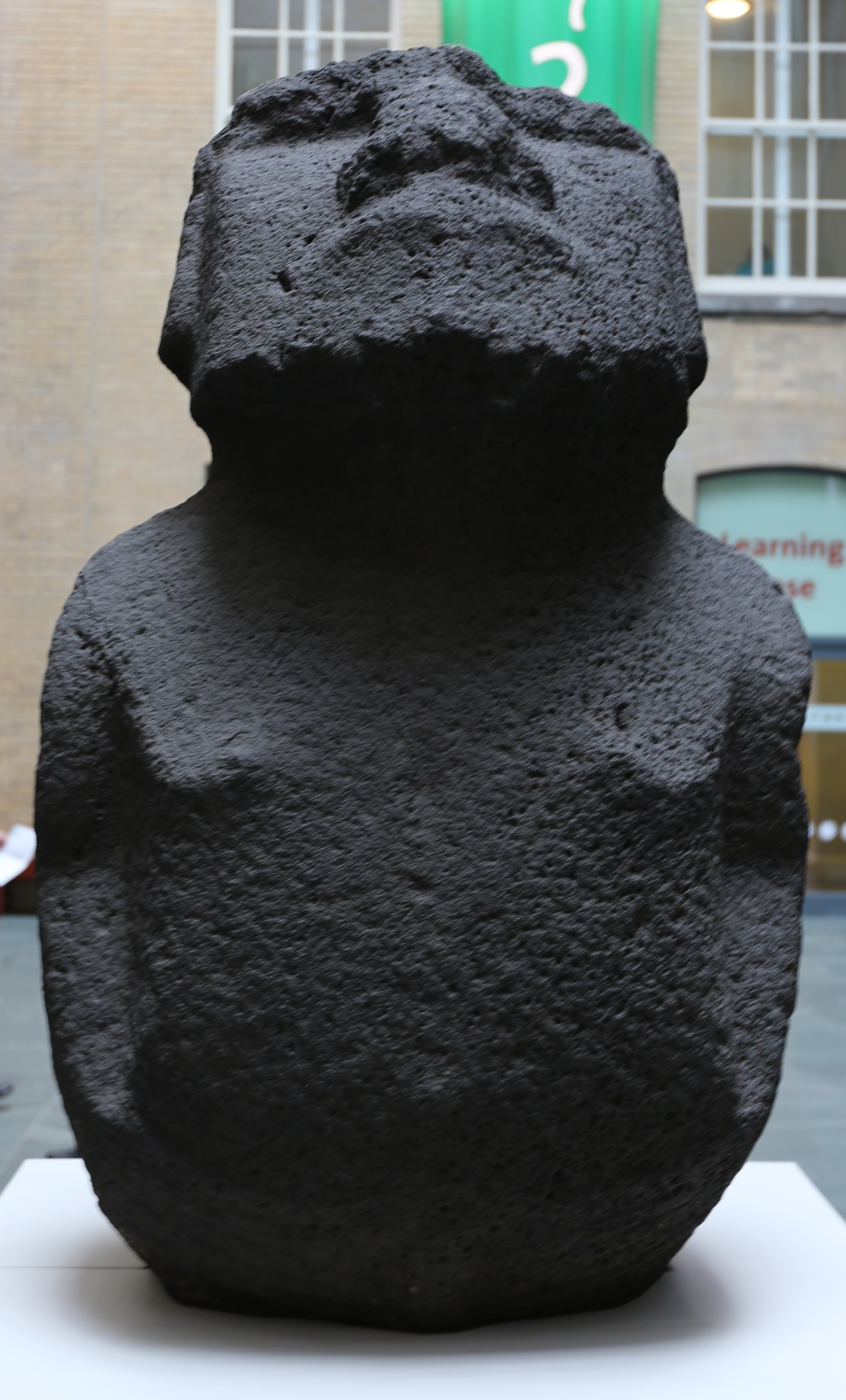
Moai Hava was loaned to Liverpool's World Museum in 2011, two years after the band adopted its name. It remained on display until 2015.

Duvall has also noted a retrospective connection to Moai Hava, a rare Easter Island statue that went on display at Liverpool's World Museum in 2011, two years after the band's formation. He explained that the name "Ex-Easter Island Head" could imply removal or destruction, referencing Moai Hava, which was taken by the British in 1868 during a period of decline on Rapa Nui due to slavery, disease, and conflict. The band later dedicated a piece titled 'Music For Moai Hava' to the statue on their second release.

== Musical style and influences ==
=== Musical style ===
The group's instrumental music spans a range of styles, with later albums often shifting noticeably between tracks. They have been described in terms of minimalism, no wave, and gamelan—genres that also served as key influences on their music. Additional descriptions include experimental, ambient, drone, electroacoustic, krautrock, post-rock, and avant-rock. Their music has also been likened to the styles of bands like Battles, Liars, Sonic Youth, and Slint, as well as to "more avant-garde inclinations of performers such as Bang on a Can or Sō Percussion."

In a 2015 interview with Loud and Quiet ahead of the release of Twenty-Two Strings, Jon Hering acknowledged the description of the group's music as "classical music imagined by rock musicians," adding that "there's definitely an element of truth in that." He also spoke about the group's independent approach to composition and musical tradition:

There's also an element of punk in the fact that we have just decided to make this music on our own terms – we've never worried about whether we're 'qualified' to enter this musical tradition. We've had reviews that have sniffed at how 'crudely' we approach minimalism, but that not only presumes to know what kind of music we're aiming to make, it also presumes that we wouldn't actually choose to make music that sometimes sounds crude or brash.

=== Influences ===
Duvall has cited Liverpool's experimental music scene as a key influence on the group's use of tabletop guitars. After seeing a local noise performance where guitars were laid flat to produce feedback, he began exploring how similar setups could be used to create tonal, structured music. He also named Liverpool-based group a.P.A.t.T. as "an inspiration for anyone attempting something different," contrasting them with the city's more typical indie rock acts.

In an interview with The Wire, Duvall cited the guitar-based works of no wave pioneers Rhys Chatham and Glenn Branca as a starting point for the group's sound, aiming to "downplay the rock element to create a mixture of the band dynamic and a chamber ensemble." He also noted the influence of minimalist composer Steve Reich's ensemble writing, while highlighting a preference for "a swing that we like… a certain latency that gives it a human characteristic," drawing comparisons to indigenous music of the South Pacific. Indonesian gamelan music has also shaped the group's approach, particularly its use of ensemble-specific tuning. This informed their interest in creating a self-contained "sound world," with guitars and percussion tuned to emphasise overall tonal coherence rather than conventional melodic structures.

On their 2024 album Norther, the group cited influences including the evolving structures of The Necks, the rhythmic focus of artists on the Kompakt label, and the aeolian sound explorations of Max Eastley.

== Critical reception ==
The collective gained critical acclaim with a trio of Mallet Guitars recordings (2010–2013). Over these releases, the band evolved from striking the bodies of guitars with mallets to resonate the strings, to introducing third bridges and playing the divided strings with bamboo sticks, and then further incorporating these techniques–refined through extensive playing–alongside bowing the strings with Allen keys and using additional preparations. Consequently, Mallet Guitars One (2011) and Mallet Guitars Three (2013) were named among the best avant rock of their respective years by The Wire. Meanwhile, Mallet Guitars Two / Music For Moai Hava (2012) was featured in Pitchfork's New Best Music category.

Their latest album, Norther (2024), was ranked first in The Quietus' Top 100 Albums of the Year 2024, and placed fourth on Loud and Quiet's year-end list.

== Discography ==
=== Studio albums ===
- Mallet Guitars Trilogy:
  - Mallet Guitars One (Low Point, 2010)
  - Mallet Guitars Two / Music for Moai Hava (Low Point, 2012)
  - Mallet Guitars Three (Low Point, 2013)
- Large Electric Ensemble (Low Point, 2014)
- Twenty-Two Strings (Low Point, 2016)
- Norther (Rocket Recordings, 2024)

=== Singles ===
- "Two Commissions for Cassette Tape" (Tombed Visions, 2014)
- "Lodge" (not on label, 2020)
- "Norther" (Rocket Recordings, 2024)

=== Collaborations ===
- Whistling Arrow (God Unknown Records, 2019) — recorded under the moniker Whistling Arrow, featuring Charles Hayward, Laura Cannell and André Bosman as collaborators

=== Production and library music ===
- Mechanical Landscapes Vol. 1 (KPM Music, 2020)
- Mechanical Landscapes Vol. 2 (KPM Music, 2020)

=== Music videos ===
- "Six Sticks" (2016), from the album Twenty-Two Strings
- "Twenty-Two Strings" (2017), from the album Twenty-Two Strings
- "Sixteen Snares" (2017), from the album Twenty-Two Strings
- "Norther" (2024), from the album Norther
- "Magnetic Language" (2024), from the album Norther

== See also ==
- Yuri Landman
- Arnold Dreyblatt
- Music of Liverpool
