= The Lost Musicians =

Novel by William Heinesen

First edition (publ. Gyldendal)

The Lost Musicians (Danish: De fortabte spillemænd) is the fourth novel by William Heinesen. It was published in Danish in 1950. The novel was twice translated into English, first by Erik Friis and published by Twayne Publishers in 1971. The second translation, by W. Glyn Jones, followed in 2006, published by Dedalus .

The plot of the novel is set in the early 20th century in Tórshavn (not named, but clearly depicted). A group of town residents, organized around amateur musicians (three of them are brothers, Moritz, Sirius, and Little Kornelius), enjoys life, but is set against Lutheran religious fanatics in the Prohibition movement. The first group is dreamers, and in real life often belong to the bottom of society. The characters from this group sometimes resemble real people with whom Heinesen had contact with in his early life, such as poet Otto Gelsted. The conflict between the groups is given a new dimension and is represented as a conflict between good and evil. It is possible that Heinesen identifies himself with one of the characters, Orfeus, the son of Moritz, who is a talented musician and, at the end of the novel is taken by ship to Denmark to start his education.

The book is organized into four "movements", divided into chapters, with each divided into chapters featuring extended headings. This is a clear reference to The History of Tom Jones, a Foundling by Henry Fielding.
