= Arnold Dreyblatt =

American classical composer

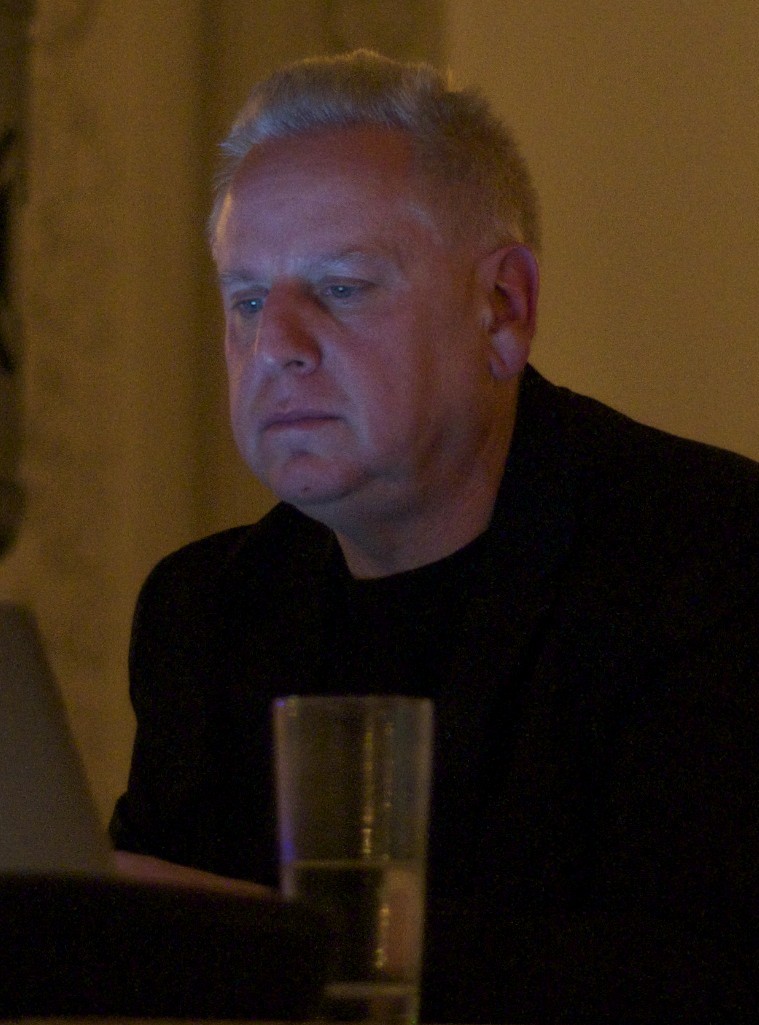
- Dreyblatt in 2011
- Born: 1953 (age 72–73); New York City, New York
- Education: University at Buffalo, Wesleyan University
- Known for: Composer, performance artist, visual artist
- Website: www.dreyblatt.net

Arnold Dreyblatt (born 1953) is an American composer, performance artist and visual artist from the second generation of New York minimal composers. His musical compositions are usually based on just intonation harmonics that he performs by a bowing technique he developed for his modified double bass and other modified and conventional instruments which he specially tunes. In his installations, performances and media works, Dreyblatt creates complex textual and spatial metaphors for memory which serves as a media discourse on recollection and the archive. His installations, public artworks and performances have been exhibited and staged extensively in Europe.

== Biography ==
Arnold Dreyblatt was born in 1953 in New York City. His mother, Lucille Wallenrod (1918–1998), was a painter.

Dreyblatt started his studies at Wesleyan University in the 1970s. He transferred to the Center for Media Study at the University at Buffalo. In 1982, Dreyblatt obtained a master's degree in musical composition from Wesleyan University. His thesis was titled, "Nodal Excitation". Dreyblatt studied music with Pauline Oliveros, La Monte Young and Alvin Lucier (at Wesleyan University), and new media art with Steina and Woody Vasulka.

Dreyblatt originally used a steady pulse provided by the bowing motion on his double bass (placing his music in the minimal music category), but he eventually added many more instruments and more rhythmic variety. He invented a set of new and original instruments, performance techniques and a system of tuning.

Dreyblatt received a 1998 Foundation for Contemporary Arts Grants to Artists Award. He has worked with Paul Panhuysen, Pierre Berthet and Ex-Easter Island Head. Dreyblatt's 2006 sculpture "Innocent Questions", which resembles the layout of an IBM punch card, is installed at the Center for Studies of the Holocaust and Religious Minorities in Oslo, Norway.

He has been based in Berlin, Germany, since 1984. In 2007, he was elected to the Academy of Arts, Berlin.

== Collaboration ==
Dreyblatt has collaborated on material with the psych-folk band Megafaun. They recorded an album in 2012 and performed at the third annual Hopscotch Music Festival in Raleigh, North Carolina, in September 2012 and at the Ecstatic Music Festival in New York City in February 2013.

== Discography ==
- Nodal Excitation, (India Navigation, 1982)
- Propellers in Love, and "High Life" (HatART, 1986)
- a haymisch groove, Extraplatte, Vienna (1994)
- Animal Magnetism, (Tzadik)
- The Sound of One String – Previously Unreleased Live Recordings 1979–1992, (Table of the Elements, 1998)
- "Escalator" on Renegade Heaven, Bang on a Can All-Stars, (Cantaloupe, 2000)
- The Adding Machine, (Cantaloupe, 2002)
- Lapse, (Table of the Elements, 2004)
- Live at Federal Hall, (Table of the Elements, 2006)
- Resonant Relations, (Cantaloupe, 2008)
- Appalachian Excitation, with Megafaun (Northern Spy, 2013)
