= Garten (disambiguation) =

Garten is a German surname, translating as garden. It can refer to:

== People ==
- Jeffrey Garten, an American politician
- Ina Garten, an American author
- Al Garten, a football coach
- Ariel Garten, a Canadian artist and scientist
- Joel Garten, an American musician

== Gardens ==
- Englischer Garten, a garden in Munich, Germany
- Britzer Garten, a garden in Berlin, Germany
- Großer Garten, a garden in Dresden, Germany

== Zoos ==
- Zürich Zoologischer Garten, a zoo in Switzerland
- Zoologischer Garten Berlin, a zoo in Berlin, Germany

== Other ==
- Garten, an island in Trøndelag county, Norway
- Garten, West Virginia, a small community in the United States
- Boat of Garten, a village in Scotland
- Scholz Garten, a bar in Texas
- Gartan, a village in County Donegal, Ireland (often misspelled as Garten)
