= Experimental musical instrument =

Musical instrument that modifies an existing class of instruments

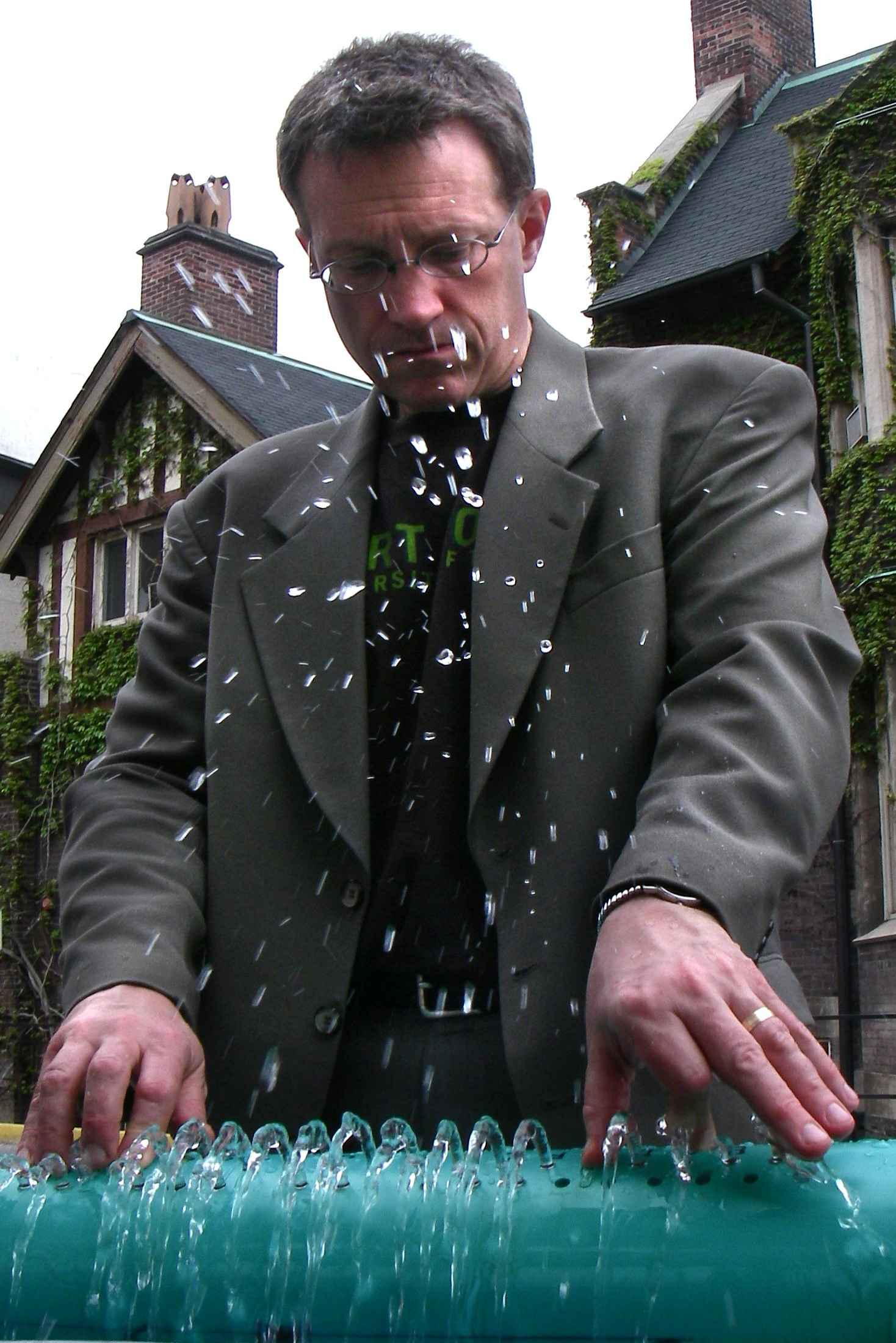
Gage Averill playing an experimental hydraulophone pipe organ made from a piece of sewer drainage pipe and plumbing fittings in 2006

An experimental musical instrument (also called a custom-made instrument or invented instrument) is a musical instrument that modifies or extends an existing instrument or class of instruments, combines features of different instrument families, or introduces a new way of producing or controlling sound. Experimental instruments may be acoustic, electroacoustic, electronic or digital, and may be constructed from conventional instrument parts, newly fabricated components, household objects, industrial materials or electronic devices.

The category includes relatively simple modifications, such as objects inserted between the strings of a prepared piano, as well as purpose-built instruments employing non-standard tunings, resonators, interfaces or sound sources. Some combine acoustic mechanisms with amplification or electronic processing. In a digital musical instrument, a physical controller or gestural interface is connected to a computer-based sound-generation system, and the relationship between a performer's actions and the resulting sound is determined by a configurable mapping.

Experimental instrument building has been associated with experimental music, electronic music, sound art, microtonal music and the design of new interfaces for musical expression. Prominent twentieth-century composers and builders include Luigi Russolo, Harry Partch, John Cage, Ivor Darreg and Hans Reichel.

== Types ==
Video of a hydraulophone; the music combines "Huron Carol" and "Une Jeune Pucelle"

Experimental musical instruments use a wide range of materials and sound-production methods. Some are assembled from metal, plastics, plumbing components, discarded machinery or other found objects. Others modify conventional string, wind, percussion or keyboard instruments. Instruments documented by Bart Hopkin include designs using vibrating strings, bars, membranes and air columns, as well as hybrid instruments combining several sound-producing principles.

Some experimental instruments employ environmental forces. Experimental hydraulophones use flowing water as part of both the sound-producing mechanism and the playing interface. Site-specific instruments such as the Sea organ in Zadar are activated by waves rather than by a performer in the conventional sense.

Electronic and electroacoustic instruments may use oscillators, pickups, contact microphones, sensors, digital controllers or computer processing. Research in computer music has included digital synthesis, signal processing, algorithmic composition and controllers for musical performance.

Some experimental string instruments employ an additional or movable bridge. A third bridge divides the vibrating portion of a string and can produce additional tones and overtones. A prepared guitar may be modified by placing a rod or another object beneath its strings, while other third-bridge instruments are constructed specifically around the technique. Musicians associated with modified and purpose-built third-bridge instruments include Fred Frith, Glenn Branca, Hans Reichel and Yuri Landman.

Other instruments are developed for tuning systems that cannot be performed conveniently on conventional Western instruments. Harry Partch constructed an ensemble of adapted and newly invented instruments for music in extended just intonation, while Ivor Darreg built instruments for xenharmonic and microtonal music.

== History ==
=== 1900s–1950s ===
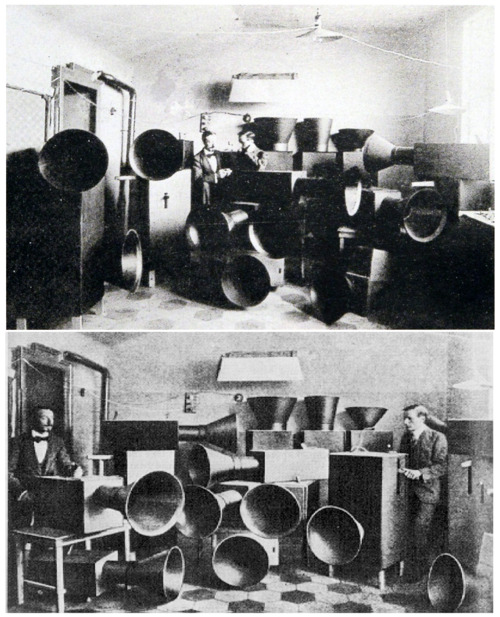
Luigi Russolo and his intonarumori

Italian Futurist artist and composer Luigi Russolo argued in his 1913 manifesto The Art of Noises that the sounds of modern industry should be incorporated into music. Russolo and Ugo Piatti subsequently constructed the intonarumori, a group of hand-operated instruments designed to produce categories of noise including buzzes, hisses, howls and explosions. Reconstructions of sixteen intonarumori were presented by the San Francisco Museum of Modern Art and partner organisations in 2009.

Leon Theremin developed the theremin in 1920. The instrument is played without physical contact: movement of the performer's hands within electromagnetic fields generated by two antennas controls its pitch and volume. The Metropolitan Museum of Art describes it as one of the earliest electronic musical instruments. The ondes Martenot, introduced by Maurice Martenot in 1928, similarly provided an interface for continuously variable electronic pitch.

The luthéal, developed by George Cloetens, was a mechanism installed in a piano to alter its timbre. Its selectable registers could produce sounds resembling plucked or struck-string instruments, and Maurice Ravel used it in works including Tzigane.

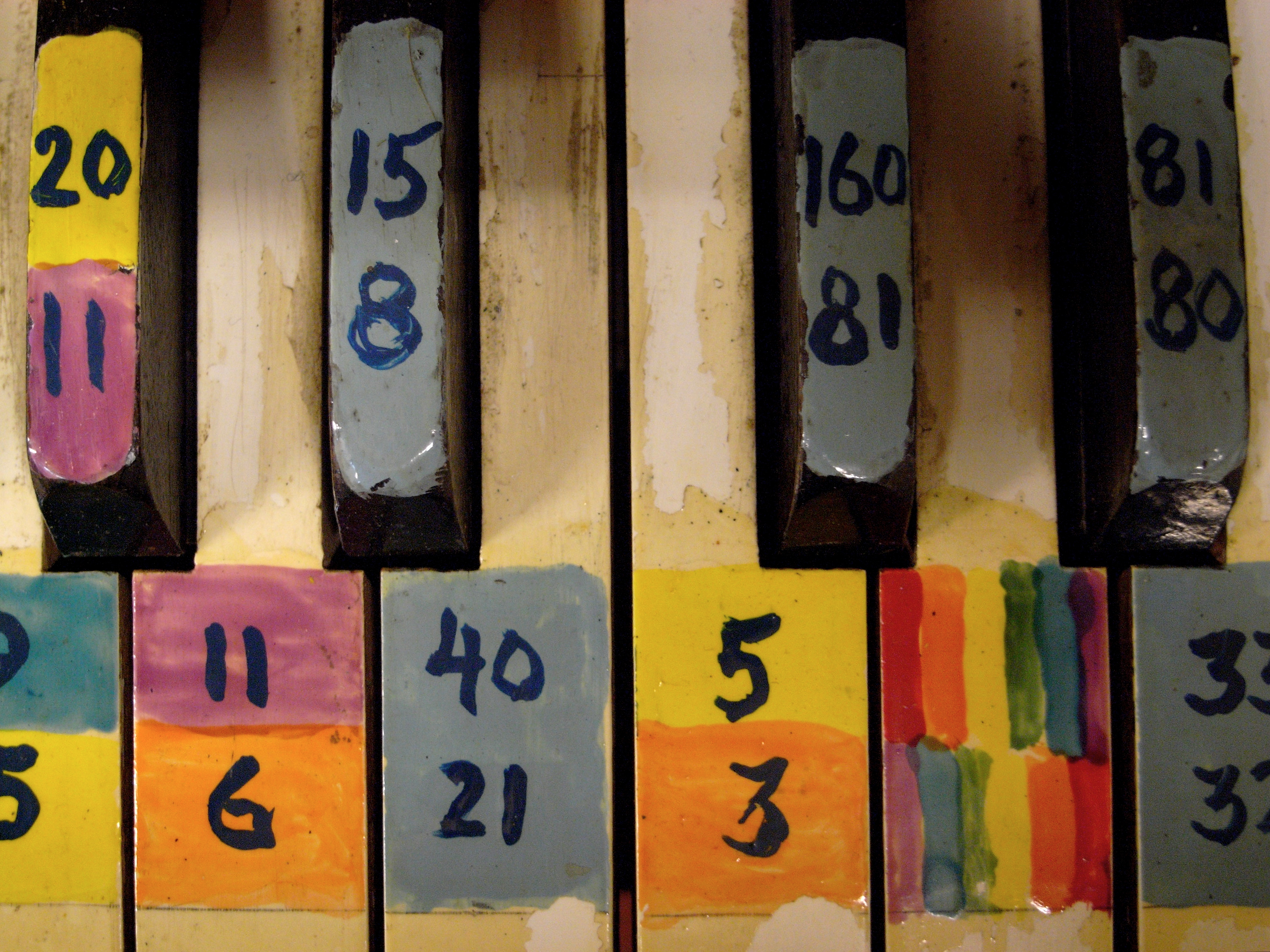
Partch's chromelodeon

Harry Partch was an American composer, theorist and instrument builder who worked systematically with microtonal scales and extended just intonation. Beginning with adapted violas and guitars, he constructed an ensemble that included reed organs, percussion instruments and purpose-built string instruments. His instruments included the Chromelodeon, Diamond Marimba, Cloud-Chamber Bowls and Gourd Tree. Partch described his tuning system and instruments in Genesis of a Music, first published in 1949.

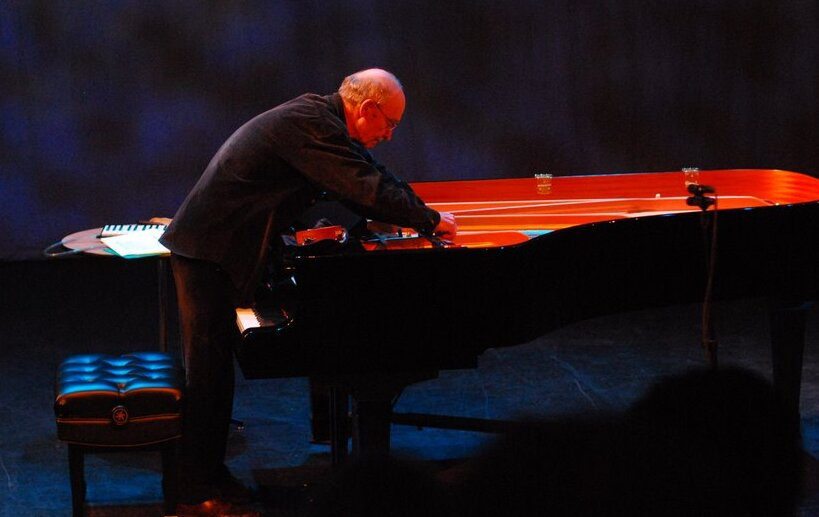
Christian Wolff removes prepared objects from a piano.

John Cage developed the prepared piano during the late 1930s and 1940s by placing objects such as bolts, screws, rubber and pieces of wood between or upon piano strings. The modifications transformed the instrument's timbre and allowed a single piano to produce percussion-like sounds. Cage also used turntables, contact microphones and amplified objects in his compositions.

Ivor Darreg was an advocate of microtonal and xenharmonic music who constructed instruments for alternative tuning systems. His early instruments included an amplified cello, an amplified clavichord and an electric keyboard drum.

=== 1950s–1960s ===
In the early 1950s, American musician Jesse Fuller developed the Fotdella, a foot-operated bass instrument used in his one-man band performances. Six bass strings were mounted across an upright body and struck by foot-controlled mechanisms, allowing Fuller to accompany himself while playing other instruments.

The Swiss-Brazilian composer and instrument builder Walter Smetak established a workshop at the Federal University of Bahia, where he constructed instruments and sound sculptures from wood, gourds, plastics and metal. Smetak referred to many of these works as plásticas sonoras, or sound sculptures.

During the 1960s, Canadian musician Bruce Haack created electronic instruments with unconventional interfaces, including the Dermatron, which incorporated physical contact with a person's skin into an electronic circuit.

Michel Waisvisz and Geert Hamelberg developed the Kraakdoos, or Cracklebox, from experiments that began in the late 1960s. The battery-powered device has exposed metal contacts connected to an unstable electronic circuit. Touching the contacts changes the circuit through the electrical properties of the performer's body, producing different tones and noises.

From the late 1960s onward, homemade synthesizers, electronic percussion, tape systems and contact microphones became increasingly important in experimental instrument design, blurring the distinction among musical instrument, electronic processor and recording system.

=== 1970s–1980s ===
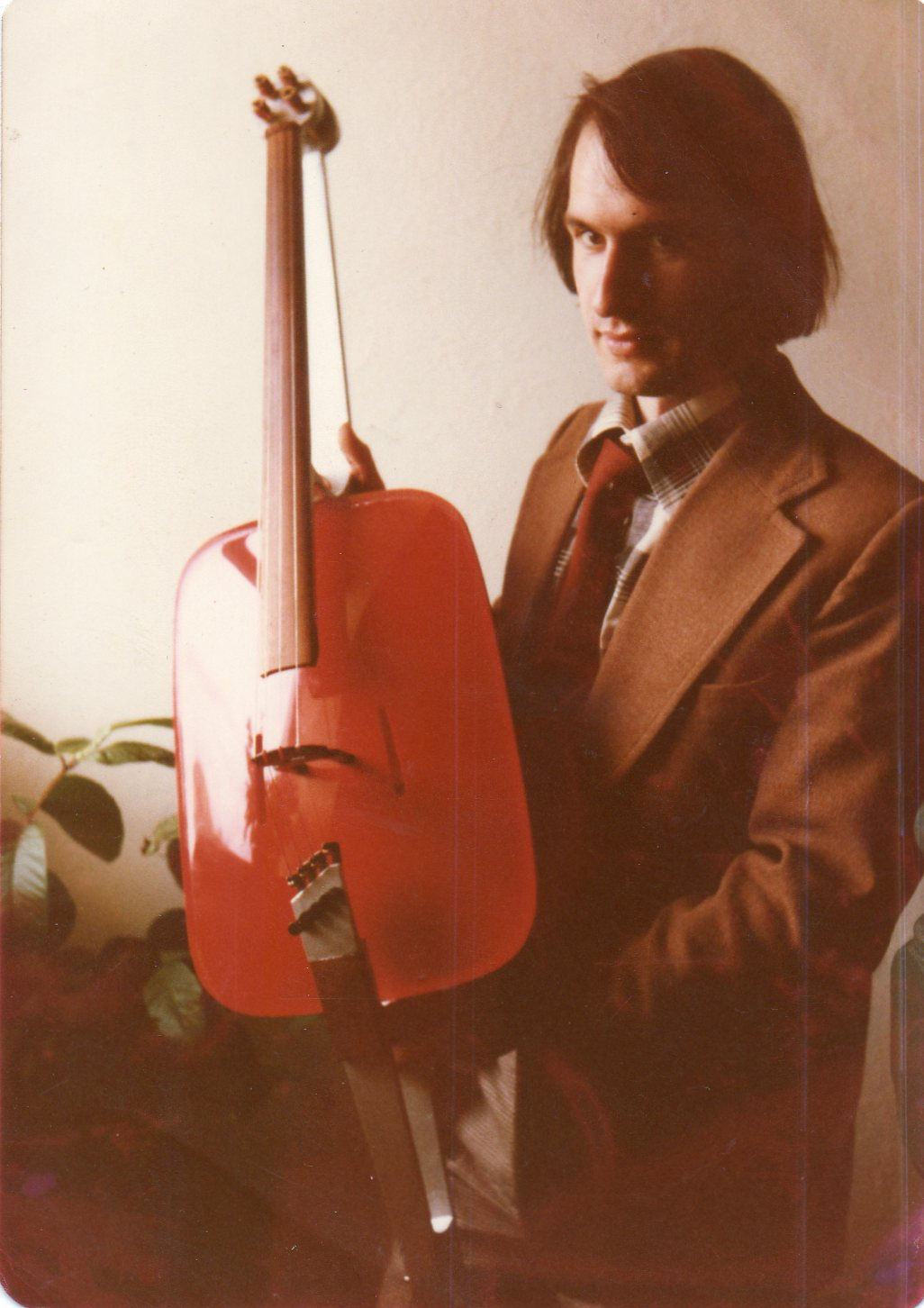
Neola, stringed musical instrument

The neola is a tenor stringed musical instrument invented by Goronwy Bradley Davies in Wales. Its design used plastics and aluminium and was documented in a British patent published in 1972. The name was also registered as a trademark. The instrument has four strings tuned G2, D3, A3 and E4, one octave below the violin, and is played in a manner related to the cello.

In the mid-1970s, Allan Gittler developed the Gittler guitar, an experimental electric guitar with a minimal metal framework and an individual pickup for each string. Its construction reduced the conventional guitar body to structural elements centred on the strings, frets and electronics.

During the same period, musicians associated with industrial and experimental music constructed instruments from salvaged and industrial materials. Z'EV and Einstürzende Neubauten used purpose-built metal percussion; Glenn Branca built guitars and zither-like instruments with additional bridges; and Hans Reichel developed guitars with divided strings, multiple fretboards and unconventional pickup arrangements.

Reichel later developed the daxophone, which uses a thin wooden blade or “tongue” attached to a block containing a contact microphone. The tongue is normally bowed but may also be struck or plucked. Its pitch and timbre depend on the blade's shape, material and the position at which it is stopped with a curved block called the dax.

American composer Ellen Fullman began developing the Long String Instrument in the early 1980s. Its strings extend across a large performance space and are played by walking alongside them and rubbing them with rosined hands, producing longitudinal vibrations.

Bradford Reed developed the pencilina, a double-necked string instrument incorporating strings, adjustable rods and bells. Its strings may be struck, plucked or bowed.

The Brazilian ensemble Uakti became known for performing on instruments designed and constructed by members of the group. Their instruments used combinations of PVC pipe, wood, metal, glass, rubber and water.

Remo Saraceni created electronic instruments with unconventional physical interfaces, including the Walking Piano, a large floor-mounted keyboard that became widely known through its appearance in the 1988 film Big.

The folgerphone, developed in the 1980s, is a wind instrument assembled from an alto-saxophone mouthpiece, copper tubing and a metal can. Because it uses a reed and a cylindrical bore, it is organologically closer to the clarinet family than to brass instruments.

=== 1990s–present ===
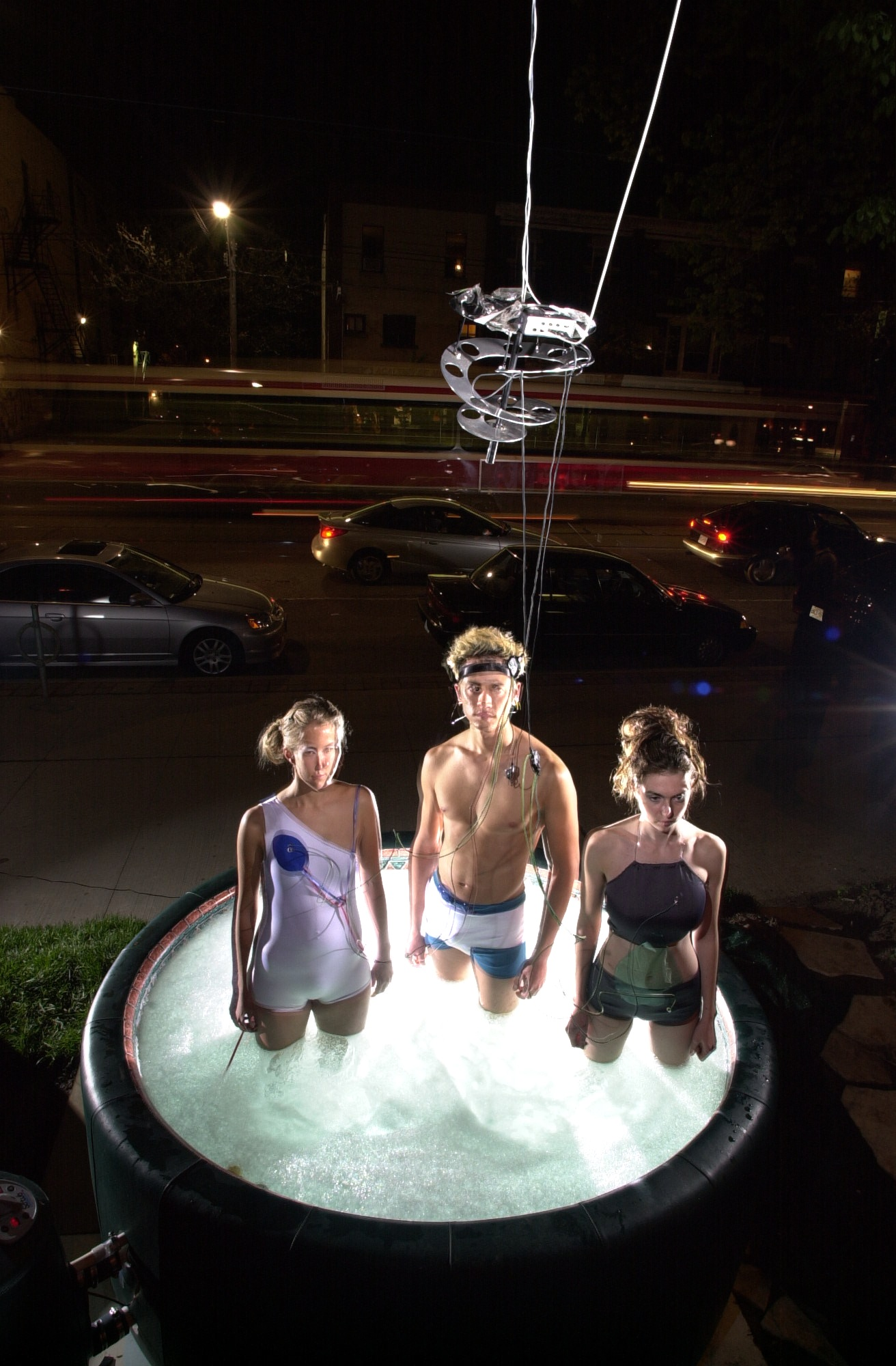
Two electrocardiophones and one electroencephalophone, which use physiological signals to generate or modulate sounds

During the 1990s, experimental instruments increasingly incorporated physiological and neurological information. Electrocardiophones use electrical signals associated with the heartbeat to generate or modify sound, while electroencephalophones use signals derived from brain activity.

The bazantar, developed by Mark Deutsch between 1993 and 1997, is based on a double bass fitted with additional sympathetic and drone strings. A separate housing for the sympathetic strings limits the additional tension placed on the main body.

Artists such as Ken Butler constructed functional string instruments from found objects, tools, furniture and discarded machinery. Cor Fuhler developed the keyolin, a bowed two-string instrument whose pitch and articulation are controlled through a mechanical keyboard. Japanese multi-instrumentalist Yuichi Onoue developed the Kaisatsuko, a two-string bowed instrument combining features associated with a fretless violin and a hurdy-gurdy.

The Japanese group Solmania and the American group Neptune constructed guitars, basses, percussion instruments and electric lamellophones from scrap metal and discarded equipment. The Blue Man Group similarly developed purpose-built percussion instruments using PVC pipes and other materials.

Founded in 1998, The Vegetable Orchestra performs on temporary instruments constructed from fresh vegetables. Instruments are built shortly before performances and include vegetable flutes, horns and percussion.

Canadian luthier Linda Manzer designed the Pikasso guitar, a 42-string instrument with multiple necks associated with jazz guitarist Pat Metheny.

In 2000, Felix Rohner and Sabina Schärer introduced the Hang in Bern, Switzerland. The hand-played metal instrument was developed following their work with steelpans and other resonant metal instruments.

In 2003, Samuel Gaudet and Claude Gauthier developed the Tritare, a string instrument employing Y-shaped strings. The unusual string geometry produces spectra that differ from the approximately harmonic spectra of conventional strings. During the same period, experimental luthier Yuri Landman built third-bridge and string-resonance instruments including the Moodswinger, Moonlander and Springtime.

In 2004, Brazilian acoustician and multi-instrumentalist Leonardo Fuks formed the CELLPHONICA ensemble, which used mobile phones as musical instruments. The players used ringtone-composition functions and placed the phones' loudspeakers near their mouths so that the sounds could be filtered by the vocal tract.

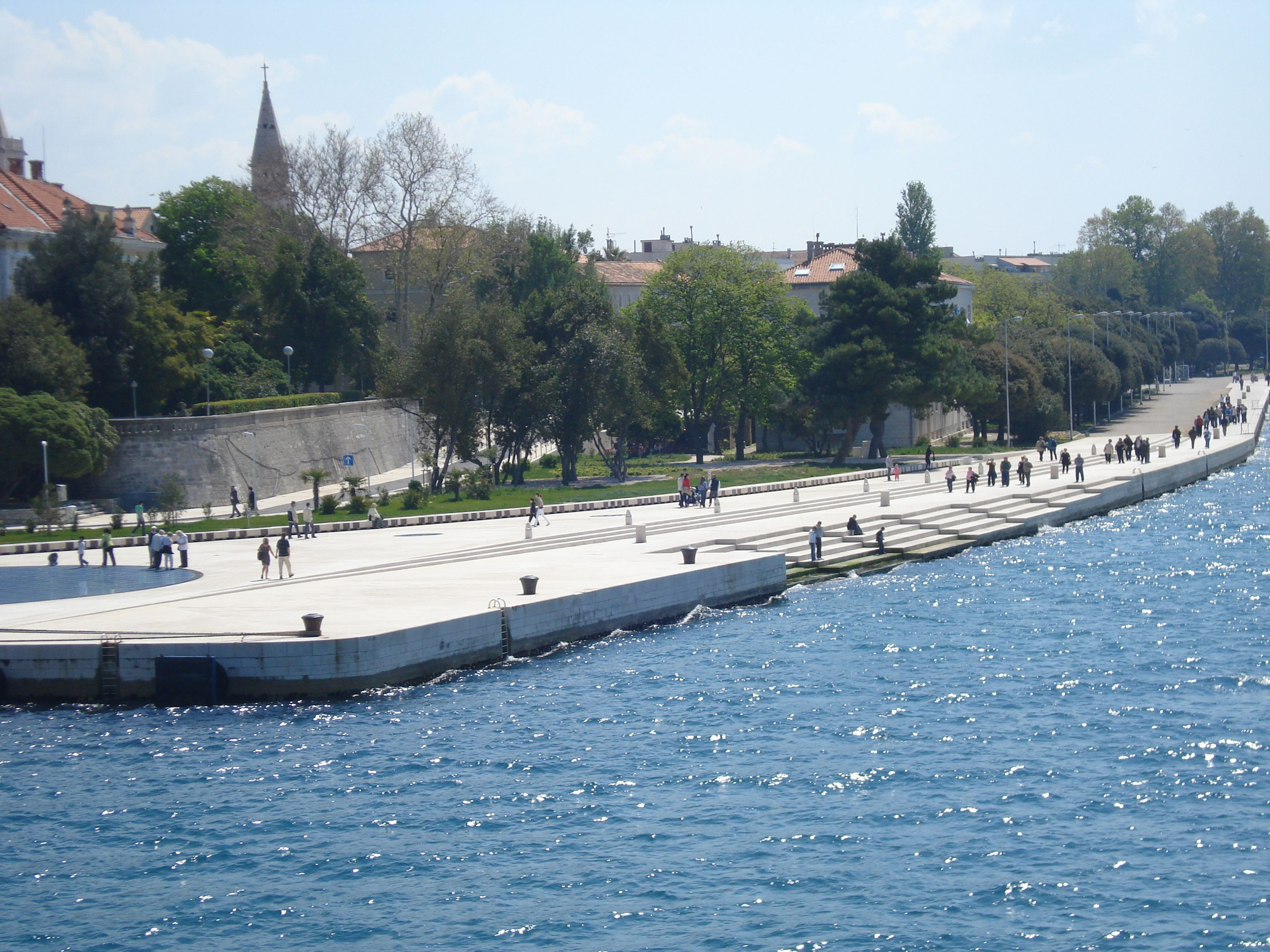
Bašić's Sea organ, which creates sound from waves using tubes beneath marble steps

In 2005, architect Nikola Bašić completed the Sea organ in Zadar, Croatia. Waves force air through pipes installed beneath marble steps, creating sounds whose timing and intensity are determined by movement of the sea.

Beginning in 2006, clarinet maker Stephen Fox developed clarinets designed to perform the Bohlen–Pierce scale. The Ice Music Festival has presented instruments constructed from ice, treating the temporary material and its gradual physical changes as part of the performance.

In 2010, composer Alexis Kirke and technologist Tim Hodgson used light sensors and computer processing to turn the Roland Levinsky Building at the University of Plymouth into an environmentally controlled musical instrument. The resulting work, Sunlight Symphony, was activated by the rising sun.

For the 2011 multimedia project Biophilia, Icelandic musician Björk used purpose-built and adapted instruments, including a musical Tesla coil and the Gameleste, which combined a celesta mechanism with bronze bars influenced by gamelan instruments.

In 2013, researchers at McGill University developed 3D-printed musical prostheses that generated sound in response to a performer's movements.

In 2015, Iranian industrial designer Aidin Ardjomandi presented the Celloridoo, an experimental acoustic instrument combining a bowed chordophone with an aerophone inspired by the didgeridoo. Its string section is played with a bow, while its aerophone section produces a drone through lip vibration and circular breathing. Ardjomandi developed the instrument after research into acoustics and musical-instrument design, using an earlier electric chordophone called the Faghan as its basis.

Contemporary digital musical instruments commonly combine a physical interface, sensors, software mapping and computer-based sound generation. Unlike a conventional acoustic instrument, the relationship between the performer's gesture and the resulting sound may be reconfigured without rebuilding the physical controller. Research in this field is presented through events such as the annual New Interfaces for Musical Expression conference.

== Builders not mentioned in the text ==
- Baschet Brothers
- Chas Smith
- Hugh Le Caine
- Kraig Grady
- Louis Hardin
- Jacques Rémus

== Artists ==
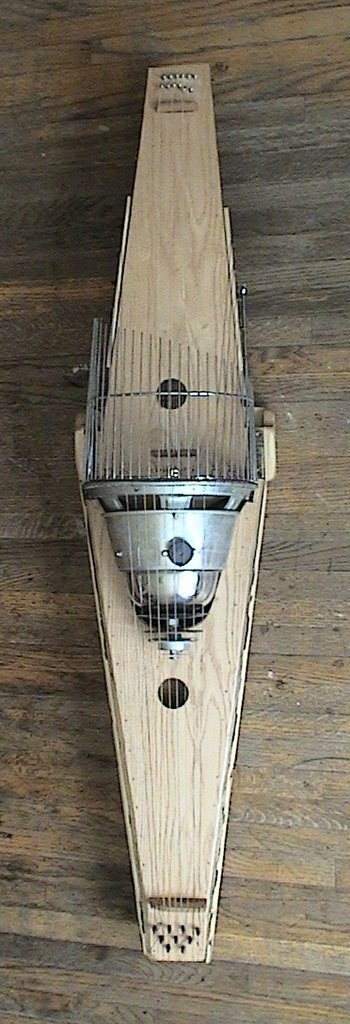
Bowafridgeaphone made by Iner Souster

Artists and ensembles associated with the construction or performance of experimental musical instruments include:

- Pierre Bastien
- Ken Butler
- Cabo San Roque
- Henry Dagg
- Hugh Davies
- Constance Demby
- Fifty Foot Hose
- Fred Frith
- Futureman
- Bruce Haack
- Herbie Hancock
- Les Luthiers
- Micachu
- Moondog
- The Music Tapes
- Neptune
- Einstürzende Neubauten
- Bob Ostertag – homemade real-time sound-sourcing system used on Getting a Head (1980)
- Hans Reichel
- Jacques Rémus
- Senyawa
- Sleepytime Gorilla Museum
- That 1 Guy
- Thomas Truax
- Uakti
- Franco Venturini

== Organisations ==
The Logos Foundation, STEIM, Sonoscopia in Porto and the Instrument Inventors Initiative in The Hague support the development and performance of new musical instruments. Their activities have included instrument construction, workshops, concerts and artist-in-residence programmes. The Guthman Musical Instrument Competition at the Georgia Institute of Technology presents newly designed acoustic, electronic and digital instruments.

== See also ==
- Amplified cactus
- Electroacoustic music
- Electronic musical instrument
- Experimental luthier
- Experimental music
- Found object (music)
- Instrument classification
- Microtonal music
- NIME
- Prepared music
- Sound art
- Sound sculpture

== Publications ==
- Experimental Musical Instruments (EMI), a periodical edited and published by Bart Hopkin from 1986 to 1999.
- Proceedings of the International Computer Music Conference (ICMC)
- Proceedings of the New Interfaces for Musical Expression (NIME) conference
