= Mayyur Girotra =

Indian fashion designer

- Born: Delhi, India
- Education: Thames Valley University
- Occupations: Fashion designer, couturier
- Label: Mayyur Girotra
- Awards: ELLE Textile Designer of the Year (2026)
- Website: mayyurgirotra.com

Mayyur Girotra is an Indian fashion designer and couturier. After about ten years in banking in Dubai, he founded his Delhi-based label in 2009. His work is built around regional Indian textiles and hand embroidery, and several of his collections have reworked vintage fabrics into new garments.

Girotra was the headline designer at the first South Asian New York Fashion Week in 2022 and showed collections during New York Pride in 2023 and 2024. His 2026 work included a gown for Diya Mehta Jatia at the Met Gala and a collection with Swadesh, the craft initiative of the Reliance Foundation. That year he also received the Textile Designer of the Year award at the ELLE Style Awards.

== Early life and education ==
Girotra was born into a Punjabi family in Delhi. His mother ran a boutique and collected Indian textiles, including Kanchipuram silks and phulkari, and he has credited her with his early interest in fabric. As a child he collected fashion magazines. He studied at Thames Valley University in London, now the University of West London.

Girotra then worked in wealth management and investment banking in Dubai for about ten years. He has said that, as an only son, he chose banking because he did not want to hurt his parents.

== Career ==
=== Early career ===
Girotra founded the Mayyur Girotra label in 2009 with a workshop in Delhi, starting with capsule collections and private showcases. He was chosen as official designer for Seychelles India Day in 2013, a three-day event themed on Indian cinema.

The label opened a store in Mumbai in 2014 and its first Middle East store, in Dubai, in September 2015. Girotra also showed at Dubai Fashion Week, and in 2016 he was among fifteen Indian designers scheduled to show at the first French European Indian Fashion Week at the Eiffel Tower in Paris. Stores in New York, New Jersey and San Francisco followed.

=== New York ===
Girotra headlined the first South Asian New York Fashion Week at 48 Wall Street in September 2022 with a collection titled Zamani. The show brought him to Google's attention and led to a talk at the company and a Pride collaboration the following year.

At the start of Pride Month in June 2023 he presented Aikya, his first ready-to-wear capsule, at the Āve India Design Collective in SoHo, with sponsorship from Pride at Google and the Indus Google Network. The collection put Kutch-style embroidery on casual Western pieces, and its cast included models of varied body types and gender identities. The Hindu and The Hollywood Reporter India described him as the first South Asian designer to show at New York Pride. He returned in June 2024 with Ride to Pride, a gender-neutral collection presented at Rockefeller Center with a cast of 34 LGBTQIA+ models.

Girotra and stylist Diya Mehta Jatia began working together in early 2024 on a collection that combined denim with zardozi, bandhani and other Indian techniques. Titled The Kadhai Chronicles, it included denim ghararas and vintage handwoven textiles and was shown privately at the New York residence of artist Vivian Reiss in May 2025.

=== Later work ===
By 2025 Girotra had also begun designing interiors under the name Mayyur Girotra Homes.

He launched The Collectables in March 2026, a series built partly from textiles he had collected over many years, among them vintage Kutch weaves, ikat, bandhani and Kanchipuram silks. Some pieces were made from Rabari "dunki" camel bags and vintage saris. The two-day launch in Delhi included a Shahi Iftar on the Shahjahan Terrace of the Jama Masjid, hosted by Imam Shaban Bukhari and Girotra. The label works with artisan clusters over long periods, and Girotra has committed to paying artisans fairly.

For the Met Gala in May 2026, whose theme was "Costume Art", Girotra designed the gown worn by fashion consultant Diya Mehta Jatia. It had a gold and silver Kanchipuram silk base under an ivory sheath made from sholapith, a plant pith worked by artisans in West Bengal. The overlay took nine weeks to make and combined Indian shola motifs with European Baroque architectural forms.

=== Swadesh collaboration ===
Radhika M. Ambani wore an ensemble from Girotra's collaboration with Swadesh, the Reliance Foundation's craft initiative, at Swadesh's first anniversary celebration in Mumbai on 10 October 2026. It paired a dhoti-style skirt with a corset. The skirt was hand-painted by Swadesh artisans in the Srikalahasti style of Kalamkari with scenes from the Krishna Leela, the corset showed the Kalpavriksha, and Girotra worked the motifs over with zardozi, pitta, dabka and appliqué.

Swadesh approached Girotra about four months before the collection's launch and gave him a free hand over textiles and silhouettes, provided every piece was made by hand. He worked with the retailer's weaving clusters in Banaras and Andhra Pradesh. The 56-piece collection, released in September 2026 at Swadesh's store in Mumbai, used Kanchipuram silk, Pochampally ikat, Banarasi brocade, bandhani, Patan patola and Kalamkari, and included jackets woven from interlaced strips of ikat.

At the anniversary event, Kriti Sanon wore a kurta set from the collaboration in gold tissue with Kutch embroidery and a double-ikat patola dupatta. Shanaya Kapoor wore an anarkali from the collection in gold tissue and brocade.

== Design approach ==
Girotra's designs draw on zardozi, gota patti and tilla embroidery, Kutch patchwork and Banarasi brocade. He has said his work began with patola and combines ek taar, salma sitara and Kashmiri aari embroidery, and he describes himself as a maximalist. His signature kurta shape is the "jhola", an oversized, bell-shaped A-line silhouette, and he often works with a weaving cluster in Varanasi. Elle India called his approach textile-led, noting that he keeps regional crafts such as Patan patola, Kalamkari and ikat distinct rather than treating them as interchangeable.

== Recognition ==
In September 2026 Girotra received the Textile Designer of the Year award at the ELLE Style Awards.

Year	Award	Category	Result	Ref.
2026	ELLE Style Awards	Textile Designer of the Year	Won	

== Clients ==
Girotra's clients have included actors Alia Bhatt, Deepika Padukone and Sonam Kapoor. In 2024 Sara Ali Khan wore a lehenga he made from five antique brocade saris, between 50 and 60 years old, from his own collection. In 2026 Padukone wore a custom patola kurta set with a zardozi yoke and Banarasi brocade appliqué. For Durga Puja that year, Bhatt wore a custom handwoven Kanchipuram silk sari with an organza blouse embroidered in danka, a Rajasthani metal-embroidery technique, using 22-carat gold foil. She later wore his Banarasi silk kurta with diamond-studded buttons.
