= Vivian Reiss =

American artist

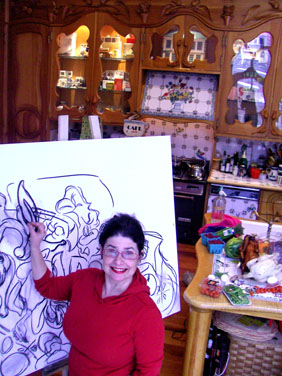
- Born: 1952 (age 73–74); New York, U.S.
- Known for: Painting
- Children: Ariel Garten; Joel Garten

Vivian Reiss (born 1952) is an artist and the owner of the Reiss Gallery in Toronto, Canada. She still spends time in New York City, but she has lived and worked in Toronto since 1975. Reiss is a painter, creator of multimedia performance events and installations, designer of architectural projects, costumes, gardens, and furniture.

== Life and work ==
Reiss studied fine art at the School of the Museum of Fine Art in Boston and the Art Institute in Boston. She apprenticed under the guidance of Marilyn Powers and Jason Berger at the Direct Vision Atelier in Brookline, Massachusetts.

Reiss is known for her large-scale oil-on-canvas works. Her art work is characterized by vibrancy of colour and expression, as well as complex compositional ideas. Reiss has had a long-term interest in still-life, portraiture and landscapes. Her subject matter ranges from her own garden, to snow monkeys in Japan, to kewpie dolls, to grazing sheep.

Her 35 plus years as a career artist includes more than 50 shows, both in Canada and around the world, over 30 of which were one-woman shows. Reiss' art work is in numerous collections, including collections of heads of state; the Canadian Embassies in Washington and Paris; and in private and corporate collections in more than 15 countries.

=== Career spotlight ===
In October 2008, Reiss showed at the Gardiner Museum in Toronto. The show was entitled El Museo del Jardin de la Humanidad (The Museum of the Garden of Humanity) – the show featured portraits of immigrant Mexican farm workers who worked on Southern Ontario farms. The portraits were also shown with paintings of Reiss' farm garden in Toronto. The exhibition was with the support of the Consulate General of Mexico in Toronto, Canada.

Reiss was invited to create work for the 2006 Echigo-Tsumari Triennial; one of the largest international art exhibitions in Japan and considered the Japanese equivalent of the Venice Biennale. The art project was entitled Satoyama Storehouse and featured the portraits of the inhabitants of Hachi, a small rice farming village in the mountains of Japan. Reiss lived in the village for three months as part of the artist residency and during the Triennial Reiss' work was exhibited in the village's abandoned school house and viewed by more than 300,000 people. In addition to the Triennial, Reiss had a concurrent show at the Canadian Embassy in Tokyo of her portraits of prominent Canadians in the arts.

A catalogue of Reiss' portraits has been published showcasing a wide range of subjects. See portraits section below for more details.

== The Reiss Gallery ==
The Reiss Gallery is located at 500 College Street, in Toronto's Little Italy quarter, and was designed by Reiss herself. The design of the gallery is unique, with the exterior of the building displaying larger-than-life wooden monkeys and a 20-foot Plexiglas 'paint palette' window design along with an oversized wooden paint brush. The gallery's interior is covered in cut ceramic plates with tiled portals flanked by curved walls and moldings – an architectural work of art where everything seems to be folding in on itself.

== Portraits ==
Reiss has painted many notable artists, performers, public personalities and philanthropists, including:

- Opera singer Fides Krucker. Fides has been the subject of numerous portraits by Reiss, several of which were created in conjunction with multimedia performances and installations that featured Fides performing.
- Helen and George Vari: supporters of York University and Ryerson University, through the Helen and George Foundation. George Vari is a member of Canada's Privy Council and during his career as a developer built numerous buildings around the world, including the tallest building in Europe.
- Eve Egoyan – pianist
- Ofra Harnoy – cellist
- Marie-Josée Chartier – teacher, dancer and choreographer
- Natalie Kovacs – artist
- Caroline Woods – dancer
- Gordie Johnson – singer and songwriter
- Deborah Demille – actor
- Linda C. Smith – composer
- Jean Stilwell – mezzo-soprano
- Garine Torossian – film maker
- Ariel Garten – psychotherapist, artist and designer Ariel Garten
- Joel Garten – composer and pianist Joel Garten
- Irving Garten

== Shows and exhibitions ==
- Gardiner Museum, Toronto, Canada 2008
- Japan Foundation, Toronto, Canada 2007
- Echigo-Tsumari Triennial, Japan 2006
- The Canadian Embassy, Tokyo, Japan 2006
- Catch 22 Gallery, Toronto, Canada 2000
- JK ROM, Royal Ontario Museum, Toronto, Canada 1999 & 1996
- Garten Mansion, Toronto, Canada 1998
- Gardiner Museum, Toronto, Canada 1997
- Garten Mansion, Toronto, Canada 1997
- Park Plaza Hotel, Toronto, Canada, 1996–7
- International Art Fair, Miami, Florida 1996
- Teodora Gallery 1996
- Bata Shoe Museum, Toronto, Canada 1995
- Teodora Gallery, Toronto, Canada 1995
- Garten Mansion, Toronto, Canada 1995
- Art Gallery of Ontario, Toronto, Canada 1994
- Gallery Herouet, Paris, France 1994
- Canadian Cultural Centre, Paris, France 1994
- Design Exchange, Toronto, Canada 1994
- Visual AIDS International Exhibition 1994
- Internal Resource Development Centre, Ottawa, Canada 1994
- Alliance Française, Toronto, Canada 1994
- Garten Mansion, Toronto, Canada 1994
- Garten Mansion, Toronto, Canada 1993
- Gallery Etienne de Causans, Paris, France 1992
- Espace Chapon, Paris, France 1992
- H.B. Starr Gallery, Palm Beach, Florida 1992
- ORT, Toronto, Canada 1992
- Fort York Museum, Toronto, Canada 1992
- Alliance Française, Toronto, Canada 1992
- Garten Mansion, Toronto, Canada 1991
- Art for Living Gallery, North Butler, New Jersey 1983
- Scandinavian Canadian Club, Toronto, Canada 1983
- O'Keefe Center, Toronto, Canada 1982
- Nancy Merril Studio, Hamilton, Canada 1982
- O'Keefe Center, Toronto, Canada 1981
- La Cantinetta, Toronto, Canada 1979
- Ohio State University, Columbus, Ohio 1979
- Guildart Gallery, Toronto, Canada 1978
- York University, Toronto, Canada 1978
- Holy Blossom, Toronto, Canada 1977

== Quotes ==
Quote from Deirdre Kelly, Curating at Home, Globe and Mail July 6, 2007. "Artists paint, sculpt or otherwise create things that people often collect. But in the case of Toronto-based painter Vivian Reiss, collecting is as much of a passion as invigorating a blank canvas with her trademark bursts of colour."

Quote from Rita Zekas, Reiss Up To Some Monkey Business, Toronto Star December 15, 2007. Quote in conjunction to Reiss' work in Hachi, Japan and her Satoyama Story portrait project. Reiss is quoted within this quote. "She found the generous spirit of her subjects amazing, considering the perception that the Japanese are a people who hide their emotions, 'During the process of painting them, they opened up. Every day, there were offerings of food and flowers. I felt humbled; the people were so warm and generous.'"

== Awards and residences ==
- Artist in Residence, Hachi, Japan 2006
- Artist in Residence, Segovia, Spain 1984
- Finalist, Ontario Renews Award 1987
- Best Restoration, Toronto Historical Board 1987

== Media room ==
Reiss has been the subject, a quoted expert and notable source for many print and broadcast publications for many years of her art career.

=== Print media coverage ===
- Toronto Star November 14, 2009
- National Post October 16, 2009
- Toronto Star November 5, 2009
- Gardening Life Fall 2008
- Globe and Mail May 31, 2008
- Globe and Mail July 6, 2007
- Toronto Star December 15, 2007
- EYE Weekly September 20, 2007
- NOW (Nuit Blanche issue) 2007
- Canadian Interiors May/June 2004
- NOW August 17, 2000
- Flare Magazine May 1999
- Spring cover for feature section, Globe and Mail 1999
- Toronto Star December 6, 1998
- National Post December 1, 1998
- House and Home November 1998
- NOW urban living feature cover and story spring 1998
- Toronto Star February 21, Jan 1 and 15 1998
- Toronto Star November 20, 1997
- NOW November 20, 1997
- NOW December 26, 1996
- EXTRA! November 21, 1996
- NOW November 14, 1996
- Toronto Life January 1996
- Toronto Star September 1995
- Chatelaine Fall 1995
- NOW April 9, 1995
- Globe and Mail July 4, 1994
- City and Country Home June 1994
- Palm Beach Daily News March 1994
- EYE Weekly November 1993
- Toronto Sun April 1993
- NOW April 15, 1993
- City and Country Home November 1992
- Canadian Jewish News July 30, 1992
- NOW February 16, 1992
- EYE Weekly November 7, 1991
- EYE Weekly October 10, 1991
- Toronto Sun July 7 and 11, 1991
- Toronto Star January 13, 1991
- Palm Beach Daily News March 1990

=== Broadcast media coverage ===
- FAVE TV 2000
- Canadian House and Home CTV 1999
- Vintage Vintage 1998
- CFTR News 1996
- Bravo TV Special 1996
- CKVR TV October 1995
- CityTV AM October 3, 1995
- CityLine TV 1995
- CBC Midday 1995
- CBC Arts and Entertainment Profile 1995
- Bravo News 1995
- CityTV Marilyn Dennis Morning Show 1992
- Homeworks 1992
- CHCH TV Success Profiles 1992

== Bibliography ==
Vivian Reiss: Portraits (2001). A catalogue of Vivian Reiss' series of portraits of Canadians in the arts.
