= Ken Butler =

American artist/musician

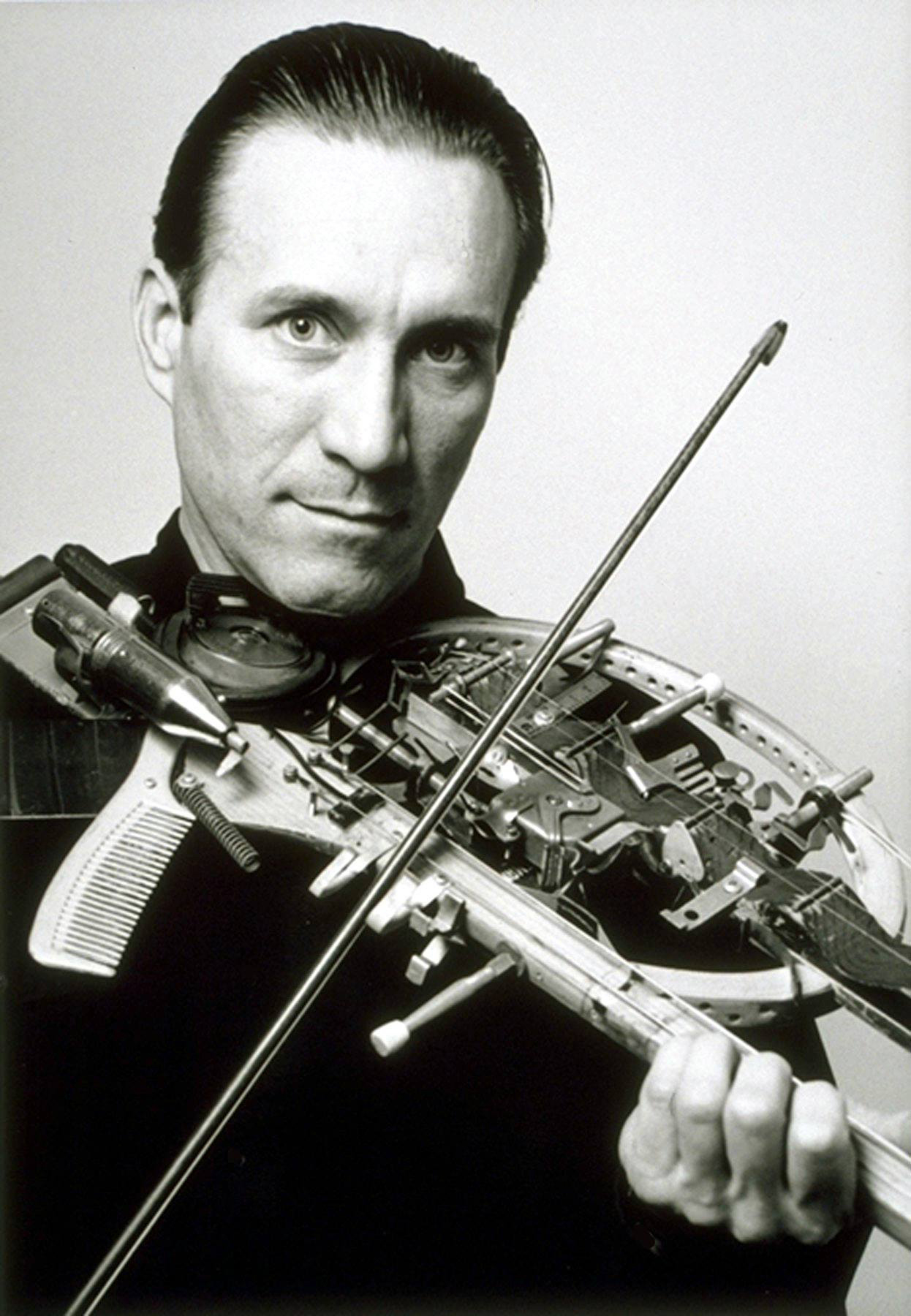
- Ken Butler in 2002

Background information
- Born: Kenneth Lee Butler; August 3, 1948 (age 78); Bethesda, Maryland United States
- Genres: Experimental art and music
- Occupations: Artist; musician; performance artist
- Years active: 1967–present
- Label: Tzadik Records
- Website: Ken Butler's Hybrid Visions

Kenneth Lee Butler (born August 3, 1948) is an American artist and musician, as well as an experimental musical instrument builder. His Hybrid musical instruments and other artworks explore the interaction and transformation of common and uncommon objects, altered images, sounds and silence. The idea of bricolage, essentially using whatever is "at hand", is at the center of his art, encompassing a wide range of practice that combines live music, instrument design, performance art, theater, sculpture, installation, photography, film/video, graphic design, drawing, and collage.

He is internationally recognized as an innovator of experimental musical instruments created from diverse materials including tools, sports equipment, and household objects.

His works have been exhibited and performed in galleries, clubs, museums, festivals, and theatres throughout the USA, Canada, and Europe including The Stedelijk Museum in Amsterdam and Lincoln Center and The Metropolitan Museum of Art in New York City as well as in South America and Japan.

== Early life ==
Butler studied viola as a child and maintained a strong interest in music while studying the visual arts at Colorado College and in France at The Institute for American Universities in Aix-en-Provence, completing his MFA in painting from Portland State University in 1977. He moved to New York City in 1988 from Portland, Oregon.

== Collaborations ==
In the past and currently Butler has worked with artists like John Zorn, Laurie Anderson, Butch Morris, The Soldier String Quartet. Butler has released an album on John Zorn's label Tzadik Records, and performed in many places including the Knitting Factory.

== Media appearances ==
His works have been reviewed in The New York Times, The Village Voice, Artforum, Smithsonian, and Sculpture Magazine and have been featured on PBS, CNN, MTV, and NBC, including a live appearance on The Tonight Show.

== Discography ==
- Ken Butler, Voices of Anxious Objects, (CD with 16-page color booklet.) Tzadik Records, TZ 7402, 1997.
- Live at Zebulon 2005, CD, Hybrid Visions Music, 2006
- KB's Greatest Hits 1993-1996, CD, Hybrid Visions Music, 2005
- Live at Kerrytown Concert Hall, (trio w. vocals) CD, Hybrid Visions Music, 2005
- This is It: Live at Zebulon Volume 1, includes "Par Twelve", CD, Zebulon, 2005
- Out of Nowhere, Judith Ren-Lay, CD, Knitting Factory Records, 2003.
- Improsculpt, Collaboration with Oeyvind Brandtsegg, http://teks.no/oeyvind, 2002
- Gravikords, Whirlies & Pyrophones: Experimental Musical Instruments, CD, with 96-page booklet and CD, Ellipsis Arts, CD 3530, 1996.
- An Artist in The Civilized World, Ric Soshin, CD, Phantom Records 4321, 1996.
- Testament: Conduction #23, Lawrence D. Butch Morris, CD, New World Records, 80482-2, 1995.
- AS IS, Loretta Roome, Eric Feinstein, (guitar tracks), for self-produced cassette, Brooklyn, NY, 1994.
- Experimental Musical Instruments, Nicasio, Ca., From the Pages, cassette Volume III, 1988, and Volume VIII, 1993.
- Improvisations, Ken Butler and Dina Emerson, Gargoyle Mechanique, New York, sampler cassette, 1990.

== Film and video production ==
- Hybrid Visions, (2-hr. DVD of excerpts 1993-2006), Hybrid Visions Music, 2006
- "Hand Song", 16 mm animated film selected for Ann Arbor Film Festival, 1974.
- "Hybrid Antics", video produced at Rogers Cablesystems, Portland, Ore, 1984.
- Art Directed Gus Van Sant's first film "Mala Noche", Portland, 1986.

== Career highlights ==
- 2008 Pollock/Krasner Foundation Grant, The Dayton Art Institute Ohio, Compiegne Library, France
- 2007 Art Gym at Marylhurst Univ, Hallie Ford Museum, Elizabeth Leach Gallery, artMoving Projects
- 2006 Mass MoCA, Sideshow Gallery, The Lab, Light in Winter Festival
- 2005 Lancaster Museum Pa, The Avampato Museum NC, Dowd Fine Arts Center, NY
- 2004 De Paul Univ. Chicago, Michigan Theatre, 2B Gallery Budapest, Kerrytown Concert Hall MI
- 2003 Collective Unconscious, The Knitting Factory, NYC
- 2002 The Aldrich Museum, CT., F. Donald Kenney Museum NY, (color catalog),
- 2001 The Klanghaus Hamburg, Rose Art Museum Brandeis, Paris, Radio Bremen.
- 2000 Exit Art, Florence Lynch Gallery, The Boston Museum, BAM Cafe, The Kitchen
- 1999 NYFA Fellowship, The Brooklyn Museum, Smithsonian Magazine, The Tonight Show .
- 1998 Wintergarden Theater, Citicorp Atrium, Met Life Windows NYC.
- 1997 Metropolitan Museum of Art, Art Gallery of Ontario, Oakland Museum, Knitting Factory, CD on Tzadik.
- 1996 The Kitchen, The Metropolitan Museum of Art, Soho Festival NYC, Portland Center for the Performing Arts.
- 1995 Lincoln Center, Thread Waxing Space, Experimental Intermedia, NYC, Maryland Institute of the Arts.
- 1994 Printemps de Bourges and Art Rock St. Brieuc Festivals, France, Podewil Berlin, Cave 12 Geneva, Whitney Museum NYC.
- 1993 NY Foundation for the Arts Fellowship, Exit Art, Thread Waxing Space, Performing Garage, The Drawing Center, Roulette, NYC, Images du Futur, Montreal.
- 1992 Test-Site Gallery, Generator, NYC., Portland Center for the Performing Arts, Gallery Nishiasabu, Tokyo.
- 1991 Metropolitan Museum of Art, Great Hall at Cooper Union, NYC, Music-Action Festival, France, ICPNA, Lima, Peru, Jamison Thomas Gallery, Portland.
- 1990 Stedelijk Museum Amsterdam, New Music America Montreal, Roulette NYC.
- 1989 NEA InterArts grant, The Apollohouse Eindhoven the Netherlands, The Virginia Museum of Fine Arts, The Painted Bride Art Center in Philadelphia.
- 1988 The Kitchen NYC, New Music America Miami, NW Artists Workshop, Portland.
- 1987 Franklin Furnace, The Knitting Factory, NYC, Portland Center for the Visual Arts, New Langton Arts Multidisciplinary Project Grant.
- 1986 The Art Gym, Portland, On the Boards, Bumbershoot Festival, Seattle, Dance Studio, LA.
- 1985 On the Boards, Seattle, The House, Santa Monica, CA.
- 1984 Littman Gallery, NW Artists Workshop, Portland.
- 1983 NEA Artist Fellowship, Oregon Arts Commission Fellowship, Portland Art Museum, Portland Center for the Visual Arts.
- 1982 Elizabeth Leach Gallery, NW Artists Workshop, Portland, Rosco Louie Gallery, Seattle
