= Electroencephalophone =

Musical instrument and diagnostic tool using EEG signals

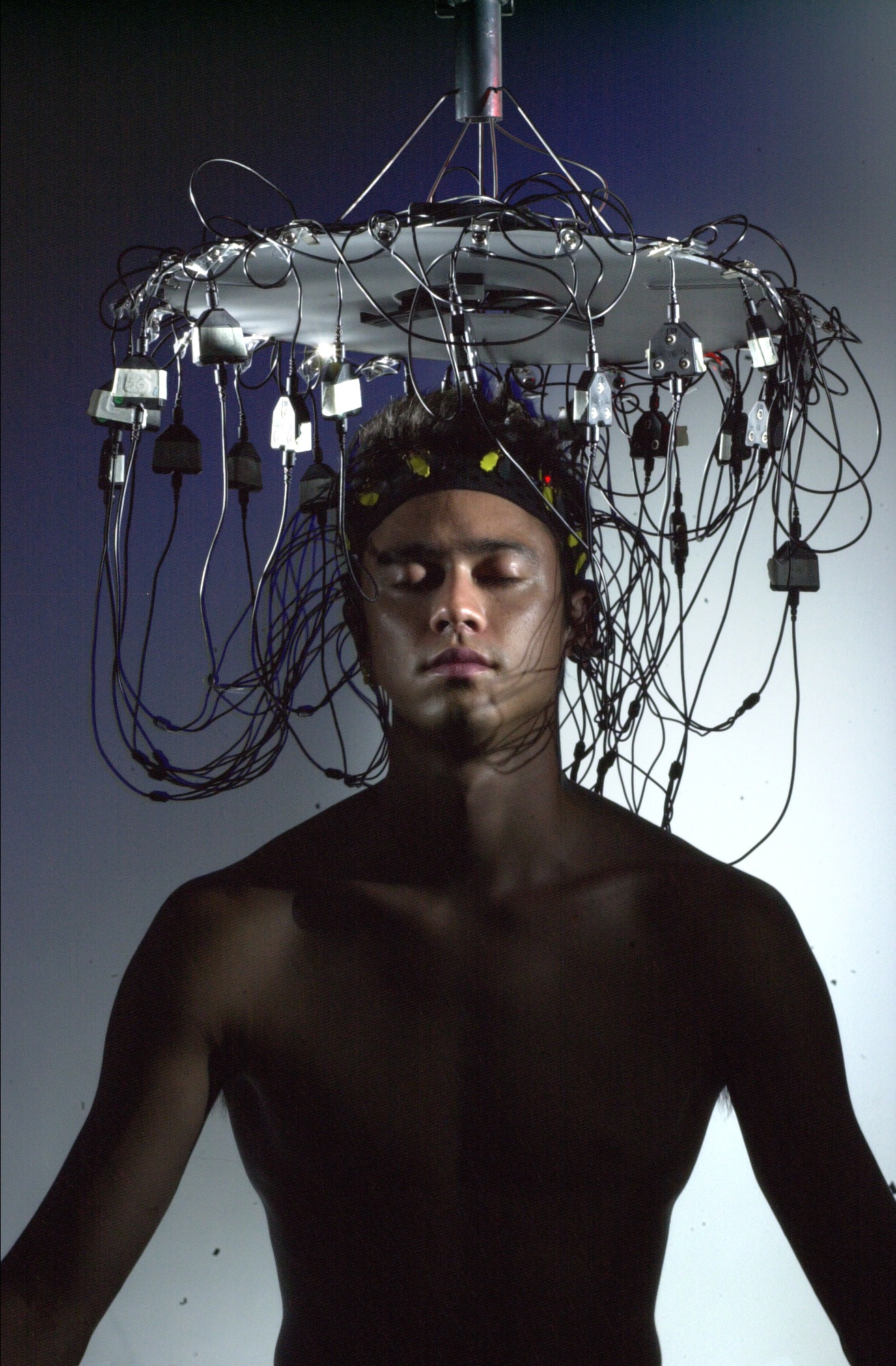
Brainwave electrodes for regenerative musical performance

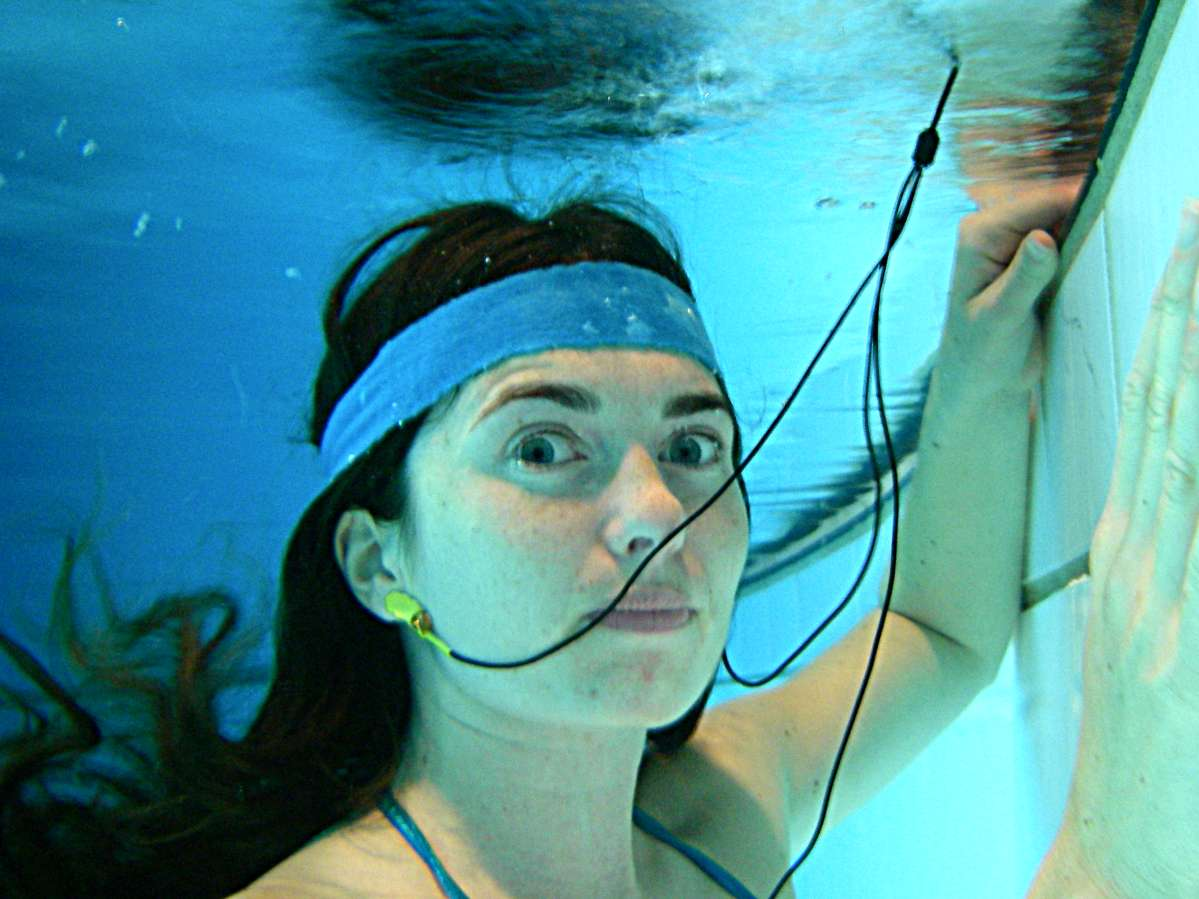
Underwater quintephone performance at ICMC 2007

An electroencephalophone or encephalophone is an experimental musical instrument and diagnostic tool which uses brain waves (measured in the same way as an EEG) to generate or modulate sounds.

Dr. R. Furth, a mathematical physicist, and Dr. E.A. Bevers, a physiologist, invented the encephalophone in the early 1940s at the University of Edinburgh. The cross between an electroencephalograph (EEG) and sonar technology, it was meant to be a way for ordinary physicians to diagnose neuropathologies.

In 1973, one was designed by Erkki Kurenniemi, a Finnish electronic musician and artificial intelligence researcher. In the summer of 1968 Kurenniemi visited an electroacoustic music conference organized by Teatro Comunale in Florence, Italy. During the conference Kurenniemi was introduced to Manford L. Eaton's ideas of biofeedback as a source of musical or composition material. Two of Kurenniemi's instruments - Dimi-S and Dimi-T - are loosely based on these ideas.

In the 1970s, David Rosenboom and Richard Teitelbaum used EEG based devices to enable performers to create sound and music with their brain waves.

Eduardo Reck Miranda is currently (~2004) involved in research which uses neural networks and brain interfaces to create music.

James Fung, Ariel Garten, and Steve Mann (~2003) have created brainwave systems to control different musical variables in an interactive way, including underwater brainwave concerts.

The electroencephalophone is a quintephone in the sense that it creates sound from the "5th classical element" (i.e. from beyond the world of matter).

== Related concepts ==
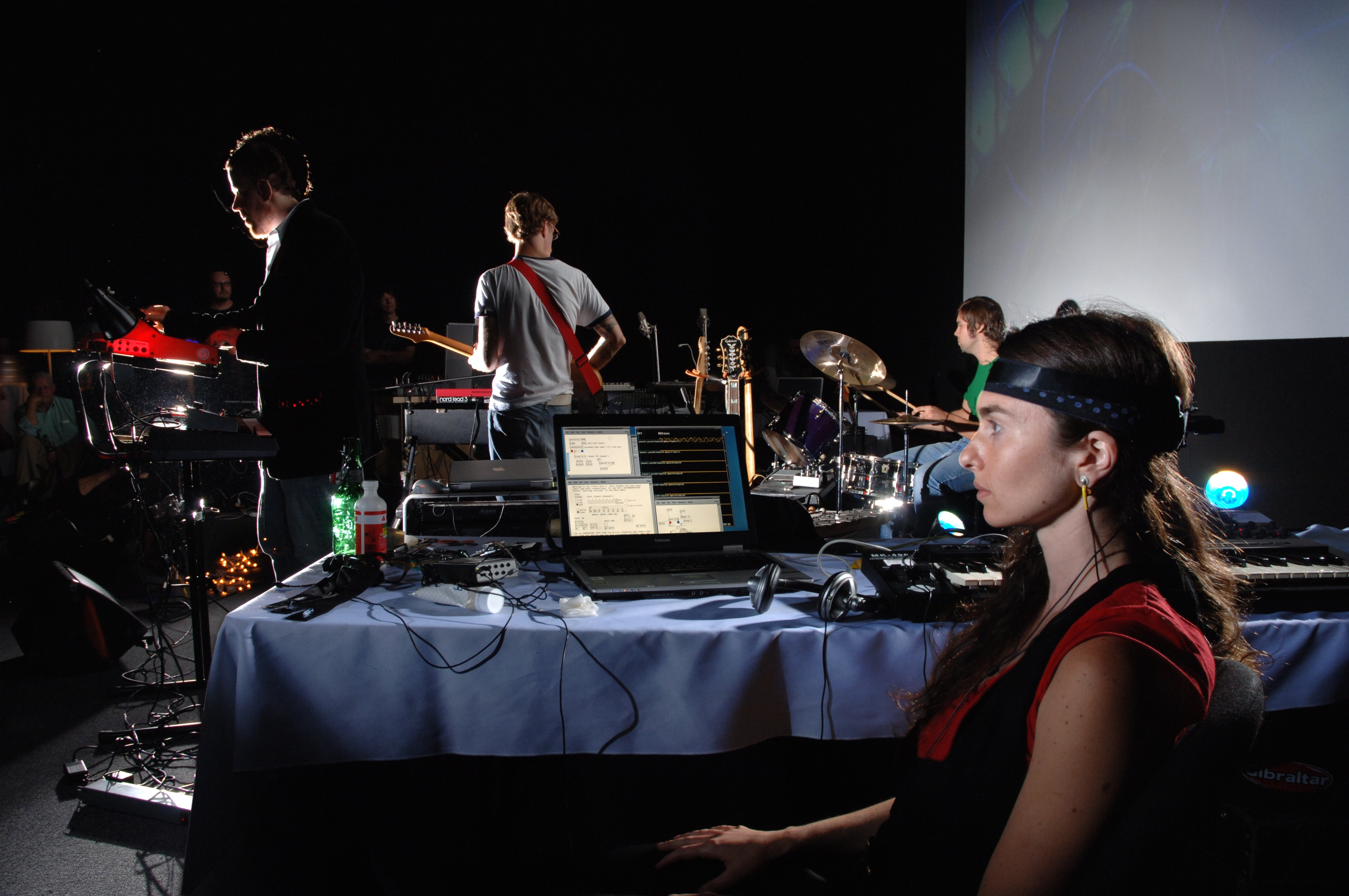
Quintephone as part of live performance. Using brainwaves the quintist directly interfaces to a music synthesizer, playing along with the other band members. A closed-loop system functions analogously with a regenerative receiver.

In addition to sound-production, regenerative brainwave musical performances use brainwave interfaces to modify or manipulate or play along with sounds of other instruments in a live performance context.

== See also ==
- Electrocardiophone
