= Muse (headband) =

Brain activity sensing headband

- Product type: Electronic headband
- Current owner: InteraXon
- Produced by: InteraXon
- Country: Toronto, Ontario, Canada
- Introduced: May 2014
- Website: www.choosemuse.com

Muse is a brain activity sensing headband. The device measures brain activity via 4 electroencephalography (EEG) sensors. An accompanying mobile app converts the EEG signal into audio feedback that is fed to the user via headphones. Muse is manufactured by InteraXon, a company based in Toronto, Ontario, Canada that was founded in 2007 by Ariel Garten, Trevor Coleman and Chris Aimone, in Toronto, Ontario, Canada. Development of the Muse product began in 2003, and after several rounds of fundraising, it was released to the public in May 2014. In 2018, the company launched Muse 2, which also measures heart rate, breath, and body movement.

InteraXon's $9.5 million Series C round in August 2022, led by BDC Capital and Export Development Canada, funded research into brain health platforms and accessibility improvements, culminating in partnerships such as the 2022 VR SDK collaboration for integrating Muse sensors into virtual reality environments. These efforts enabled the March 2025 introduction of Muse S Athena, the first consumer headband combining EEG with functional near-infrared spectroscopy (fNIRS) for hybrid brain activity and blood flow monitoring.

The device operates by representing brain waves that correspond to a more relaxed state through the sound of tweeting birds, and higher amounts of brain activity are represented by storm sounds.

It was demonstrated that Muse can be used for ERP research, with the advantage of it being low-cost and quick to set up. Specifically, it can easily quantify N200, P300, and reward positivity.

It is also widely used for a wide variety of other applications, ranging from health and well-being to scientific and medical research.

It is claimed that using the headband helps in reaching a deep, relaxed state.

Muse is worn over the ears and connects to a companion mobile app via Bluetooth. The use of Muse enables the use of biofeedback, differing from a device like Thync that claims to actually alter brainwaves by wearing it.

A dedicated progress tracking dashboard within the app displays session scores based on time spent in calm, neutral, or active states, along with streaks for consistent use and historical metrics of brain activity patterns. Users can review graphs and earn virtual rewards, like "birds" for achieving calm percentages, to motivate ongoing practice.

== Third-Party Software Integration ==
For broader data management, the app supports integration with third-party applications, allowing export of raw session data, and compatibility with Apple Health for syncing meditation and sleep metrics, as well as Google Fit for similar health data sharing.

The Muse headband's Bluetooth Low Energy protocol has enabled the development of third-party applications extending its functionality beyond InteraXon's official ecosystem. Desktop tools such as Petal Metrics and the open-source MuseLSL library provide direct access to raw sensor data for research and creative applications, supporting Windows, macOS, and Linux platforms.

For research workflows, these applications offer Lab Streaming Layer (LSL) integration—a protocol widely adopted in neuroscience for synchronizing multiple data streams with sub-millisecond precision. This enables researchers to combine Muse EEG recordings with eye tracking, motion capture, or experimental stimuli timestamps in a unified data collection pipeline.

Open Sound Control (OSC) streaming support facilitates integration with creative coding environments, including TouchDesigner, Max/MSP, Pure Data, and game engines like Unity and Unreal Engine for interactive art installations and real-time audiovisual performances driven by brain activity. These applications stream data to configurable network addresses using standard OSC message formats such as `/muse/eeg` and `/muse/acc`.

Data recording capabilities in third-party tools include CSV export with customizable channel selection and millisecond-precision Unix timestamps compatible with analysis software such as Python (MNE-Python, Pandas, NumPy), MATLAB (EEGLAB, FieldTrip), and R. This research-oriented feature set has positioned the Muse headband as an accessible entry point for academic neuroscience education and low-cost brain-computer interface prototyping.

Third-party software tools have further lowered barriers to academic adoption by providing streamlined workflows for data acquisition and analysis. Applications supporting Lab Streaming Layer (LSL) integration enable researchers to synchronize Muse EEG data with other physiological streams and experimental stimuli, facilitating multi-modal studies in cognitive neuroscience and human-computer interaction.

Tools like Metrics offer direct CSV export with millisecond-precision timestamps suitable for publication-grade analysis in software packages such as Python, MATLAB, and R, eliminating the need for custom data parsing pipelines. This ecosystem of research-oriented software has contributed to the Muse headband's adoption across universities and research institutions worldwide for neuroscience education and brain-computer interface research.

=== Global Impact at Scale ===
Muse devices integrate with iOS and Android apps featuring guided meditations, progress tracking, and an AI coach named Enso, and have been adopted by over 500,000 users worldwide, including NASA for astronaut training. Peer-reviewed validation confirms the headband's EEG accuracy for spectral analysis and frontal alpha asymmetry, comparable to clinical-grade systems. Independent studies indicate benefits such as improved mindfulness after short sessions and a 20% enhancement in sleep quality with consistent use of the sleep-focused model.
