= Folgerphone =

Experimental wind instrument

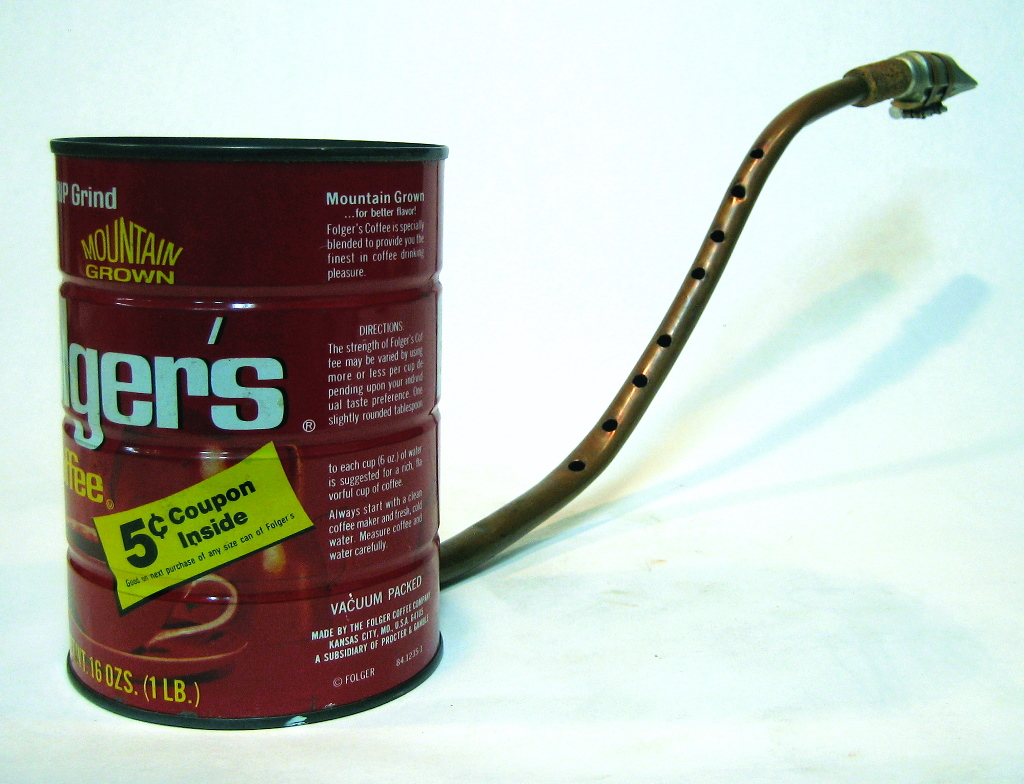
A Folgerphone

The folgerphone (sometimes Folgerphone) is a wind instrument (or aerophone). Like the saxophone it is classifiable as a woodwind rather than brass instrument despite being made of metal, because it has a reed. The folgerphone is a modern experimental instrument, using an alto sax mouthpiece, with copper tubing and a coffee can (the name is a reference to Folgers, a common American brand of canned coffee). The instrument is not commercially produced, but constructed by musicians, and need not use a genuine coffee can, but any sounding box made of metal. Although it uses a sax mouthpiece, it is a cylindrical-bore instrument, and thus part of the clarinet family, but is played with finger holes, like a recorder, rather than with keys like a saxophone or modern clarinet. In the Hornbostel–Sachs classification system, it is among the 422.211.2 subsection of reed aerophones.

== History ==
The instrument was invented by Nolan Hatcher and Craig Nutt of Alabama (members of the Raudelunas art collective, and the experimental jazz bands the Ron Pates Debonairs and the Blue Denim Deal) at least as early as 1979, when it was used on their duet album Dinosaur Time. It has also been used in recorded experimental and jazz works by others, such as Robert Horton's band Plateau (not to be confused with the Skinny Puppy side-project platEAU), as on the 1990 Arrhythmia compilation CD.
