= Ivor Darreg =

American classical composer

Ivor Darreg (May 5, 1917 – February 12, 1994) was an American composer and leading proponent of microtonal or "xenharmonic" music. He also created a series of experimental musical instruments.

== Biography ==
Darreg, a contemporary of Harry Partch and a close colleague of John H. Chalmers, Erv Wilson, and Joel Mandelbaum, was one of America's leading theorists and practitioners of experimental intonation and experimental instrument building. Frequently he published his writings in his own Xenharmonic Bulletin.

Darreg was born Kenneth Vincent Gerard O'Hara in Portland, Oregon. His father John O'Hara was editor of the (Portland) Catholic Sentinel newspaper and his mother was an artist. (His Uncle, Edwin Vincent O'Hara, was a Roman Catholic Bishop.) He dropped out of school as a teenager, but he had both self-taught facility in at least ten languages and a basic understanding of all the sciences. His real love was music and electronics. Because of his choice of music, his father cast him out, and he and his mother set out on their own with little help from anyone. At that point he took on the name "Ivor," which means "man with bow" (from his cello-playing talents) and "Drareg" (the retrograde of "Gerard"), which he soon changed to "Darreg".

In the forties, Ivor built an Amplified Cello, Amplified Clavichord, and Electric Organ, the Electric Keyboard Oboe and the Electric Keyboard Drum. The Amplified Clavichord and Electric Organ no longer exist, but the Electric Keyboard Oboe - like the organ, based on blocking oscillator circuits and capable of microtonality -, the Electric Keyboard Drum, which uses buzzer-like relays, and the Amplified Cello are still working. In the 1970s Darreg built a series of instruments he called Megalyras. Part of his concept was that the several strings were to be tuned like the several pipes that comprise a single "note" in an organ stop—multiple pipes at sounding together at selected, closely related pitches to create the sense not of several tones but of one grand composite tone.

Darreg lived for much of his adult life in or near Los Angeles, California, then spent his final nine years in San Diego. He devoted his entire life to his music and microtonality. Ivor sported a long beard to cover the fact that due to both an illness and confrontation from a violent break-in to his home in the 1950s, he had lost his teeth. He consequently taught himself to pronounce words and sing without them. He would often accompany his music with singing. He would sing the high notes in the morning when his vocal cords were tighter and the low notes in the evenings when they were more relaxed. His songs were often in Esperanto, a language in which he was fluent. He coined the term "xenharmonic", designed and built many original microtonal musical instruments, and wrote voluminous amounts of material about various musical tunings. Perhaps his most important contribution to music theory was his idea that different tunings exhibit different "moods".

Darreg's informal network of microtonal musicians writing letters to each other later morphed into the more formal Xenharmonic Alliance.
