= Xenharmonic music =

Music that uses a tuning system outside of 12-TET

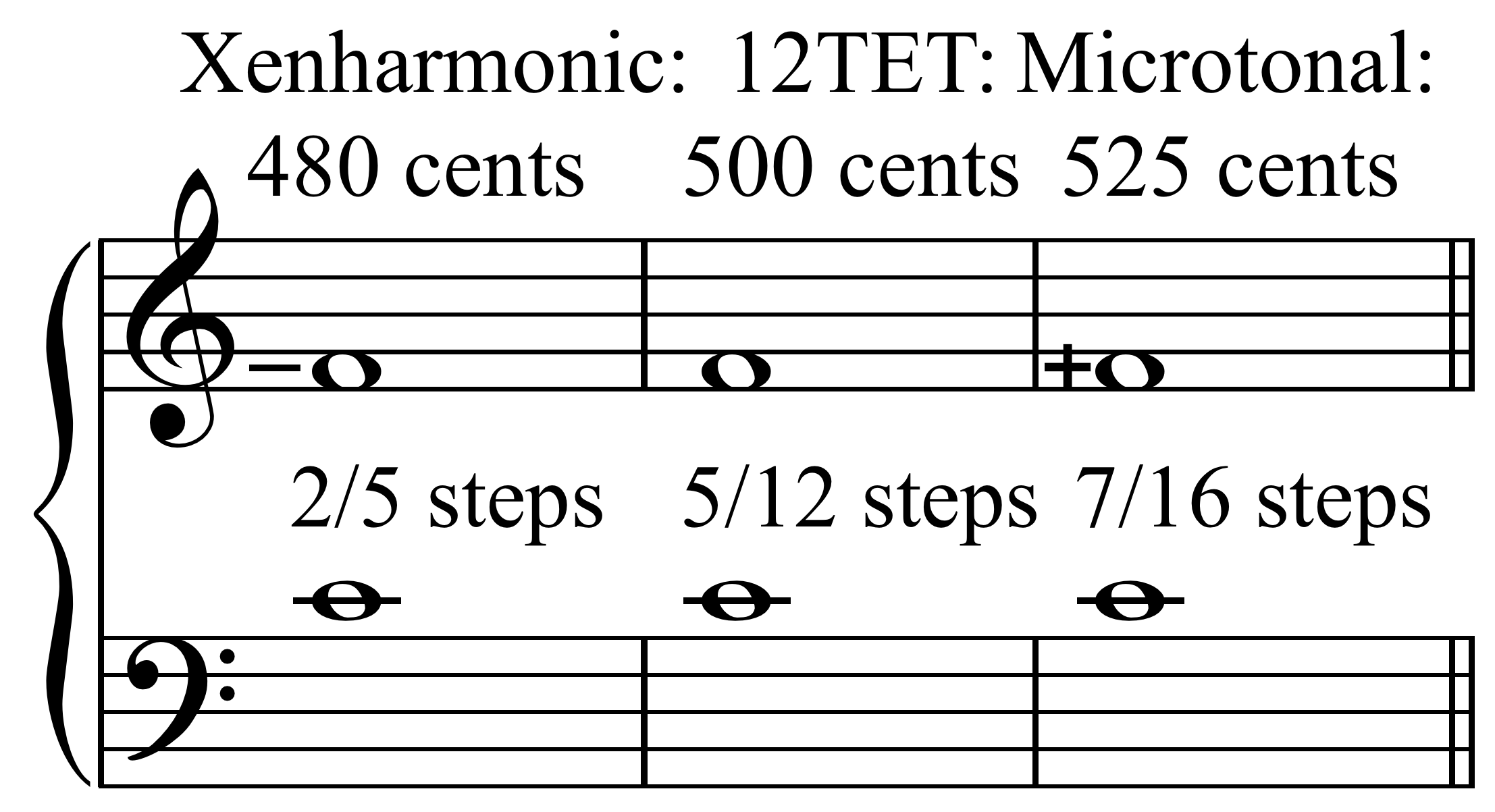
Xenharmonicity includes intervals larger than those in 12-tet (<12-tet) and microtonality includes intervals smaller than those in 12-tet (>12-tet).

Xenharmonic music is music that uses a tuning system that is unlike the 12-tone equal temperament scale. It was named by Ivor Darreg, from the Greek xenos (Greek ξένος) meaning both foreign and hospitable. He stated that it was "intended to include just intonation and such temperaments as the 5-, 7-, and 11-tone, along with the higher-numbered really-microtonal systems as far as one wishes to go."

John Chalmers, author of Divisions of the Tetrachord, wrote, "The converse of this definition is that music which can be performed in 12-tone equal temperament without significant loss of its identity is not truly microtonal." Thus xenharmonic music may be distinguished from twelve-tone equal temperament, as well as use of intonation and equal temperaments, by the use of unfamiliar intervals, harmonies, and timbres.

Theorists other than Chalmers consider xenharmonic and non-xenharmonic to be subjective. Edward Foote, in his program notes for 6 degrees of tonality, refers to the differences in his response to the tunings he uses, such as Kirnberger and DeMorgan, from "shocking," to "too subtle to immediately notice," saying that "[t]emperaments are new territory for 20th-century ears. The first-time listener may find it shocking to hear the harmony change 'color' during modulations or too subtle to immediately notice."

== Diatonic xenharmonic music ==
Music also can share much of the familiar territory of twelve-tone music yet also contain xenharmonic features. For example, Easley Blackwood, author of The Structure of Recognizable Diatonic Tunings (1985), wrote many etudes in equal temperament systems ranging from 12 to 24 tones. These etudes bring out connections and resemblances to twelve-tone music as well as various xenharmonic characteristics, reflected in Twelve Microtonal Etudes for Electronic Music Media.

About his 16-tone etude, Blackwood wrote:

This tuning is best thought of as a combination of four intertwined diminished seventh chords. Since 12-note tuning can be regarded as a combination of three diminished seventh chords, it is plain that the two tunings have elements in common. The most obvious difference in the way the two tunings sound and work is that triads in 16-note tuning, although recognizable, are too discordant to serve as the final harmony in cadences. Keys can still be established by successions of altered subdominant and dominant harmonies, however, and the Etude is based mainly upon this property. The fundamental consonant harmony employed is a minor triad with an added minor seventh.

Darreg explains: "I devised the term 'xenharmonic' to refer to everything that does not sound like 12-tone equal temperament."

== Tunings, instruments, and composers ==
Music using scales or tuning other than 12-tone equal temperament can be classified as xenharmonic music. This includes other equal divisions of the octave and scales based on extended just intonation.

Tunings derived from the partials or overtones of physical objects with an inharmonic spectrum or overtone series such as rods, prongs, plates, discs, spheroids and rocks occasionally are the basis of xenharmonic exploration. William Colvig, who worked with the composer Lou Harrison created the tubulong, a set of xenharmonic tubes.

Electronic music composed with arbitrarily chosen xenharmonic scales was explored on the album Radionics Radio: An Album of Musical Radionic Thought Frequencies (2016) by British composer Daniel Wilson, who composed with frequency-runs submitted by users of a web application that replicated radionics-based electronic soundmaking equipment used by Oxford's De La Warr Laboratories in the late 1940s. Elaine Walker (composer) is an electronic musician who writes xenharmonic music by building new types of music keyboards.

The Non-Pythagorean scale utilized by Robert Schneider of The Apples in Stereo, based on a sequence of logarithms, may be considered xenharmonic, as well as Annie Gosfield's purposefully "out of tune" sampler-based music using non systematic tunings and the work of other composers including Elodie Lauten, Wendy Carlos, Ivor Darreg, and Paul Erlich.

== See also ==
- Bohlen–Pierce scale
- Regular temperament
