= Ariel Garten =

Canadian artist and scientist

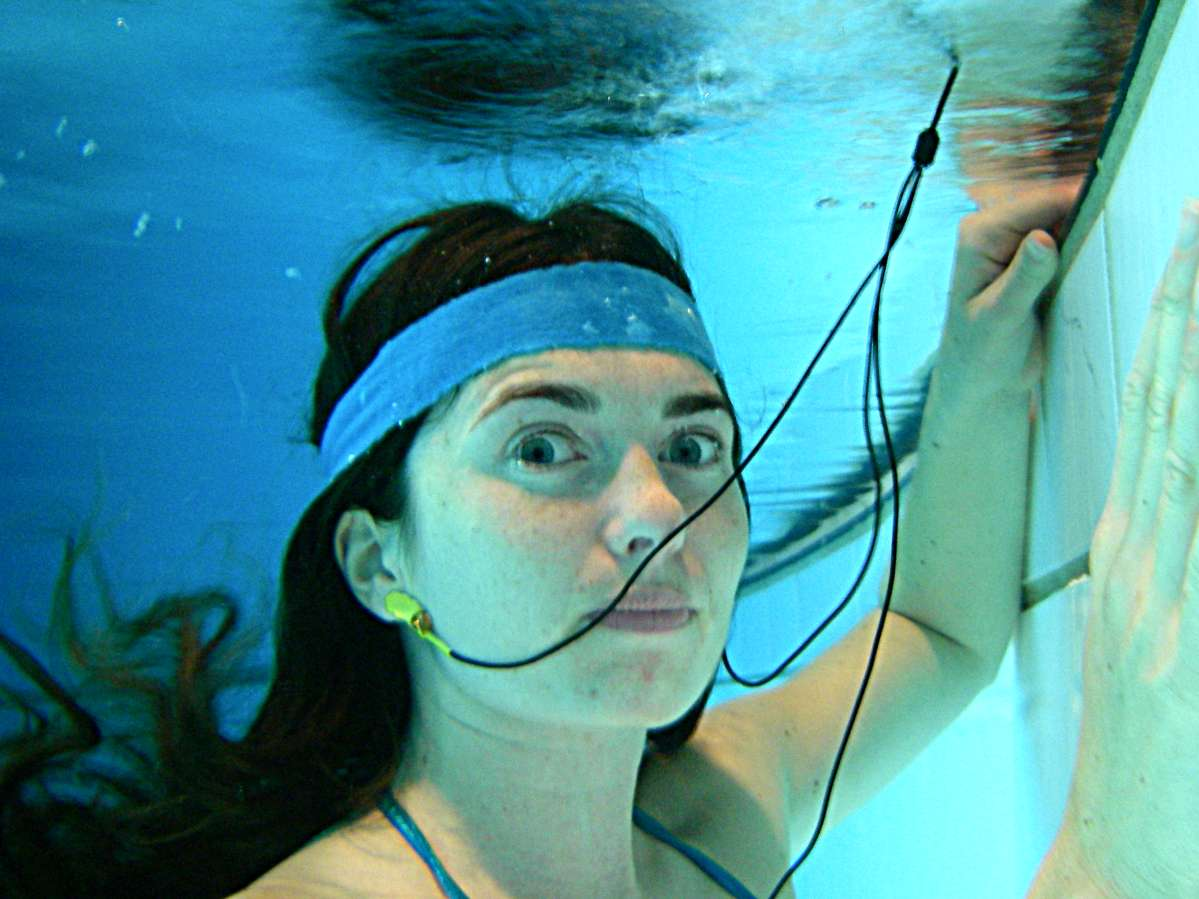
- Ariel Garten playing quintephone
- Born: September 24, 1979 (age 47); Toronto, Ontario, Canada
- Occupations: artist, fashion designer, executive
- Known for: co-founder of InteraXon

Ariel Garten (born September 24, 1979) is a Canadian artist and scientist. She is the co-founder and former CEO of InteraXon, a company which develops software for non-invasive Brain-computer interfaces.

== Early life and education ==
Garten was born in Toronto. She is the daughter of Irving Garten and visual artist Vivian Reiss, who is known for her large scale oil on canvas works. Her brother is Joel Garten. Her grandmother was a holocaust survivor. Garten attended Northern Secondary School in Toronto and completed the school's biotechnology program. In 2002, she graduated from the University of Toronto with a degree in biology and psychology with a neuroscience designation.

== Career ==
Garten began designing and selling t-shirts when she was 17. After graduating university, she opened Flavour Hall, a clothing store on College Street. She designed clothes for her eponymous clothing line, Ariel, which debuted at Toronto Fashion Week in 2003. Garten closed Flavour Hall in 2005 to open a private psychotherapy practice.

While running Flavour Hall, Garten began working with Steve Mann on an idea that would eventually become The Muse headband. Through Mann, she met Chris Aimone, with whom she would later co-found InteraXon. Garter, Coleman and Aimone founded InteraXon, a Canadian company which makes software for non-invasive Brain-computer interfaces. She served as the company's CEO until stepping down in 2015 due to her pregnancy.

Garten lectures about interdisciplinary neuroscience topics, such as "The Neuroscience of Morals" (on TVO's Big Ideas televised lecture series), "The Neuroscience of Molecular Gastronomy" and others), as well as psychotherapy and mental health.

Garten is also a psychotherapist trained in Neuro-linguistic programming.

She has performed in many venues, including The Power Plant, and shown at the Art Gallery of Ontario and Banff Center for the Arts. She gave a TEDx Talk in Toronto in 2011. She has sold her fashion across North America, including Holt Renfrew in Toronto, and lectured in North America and Europe.

== Personal life ==
In 2016, Garten gave birth to her first child with Chris de Castro.
