= Joel Garten =

Canadian pianist (born 1981)

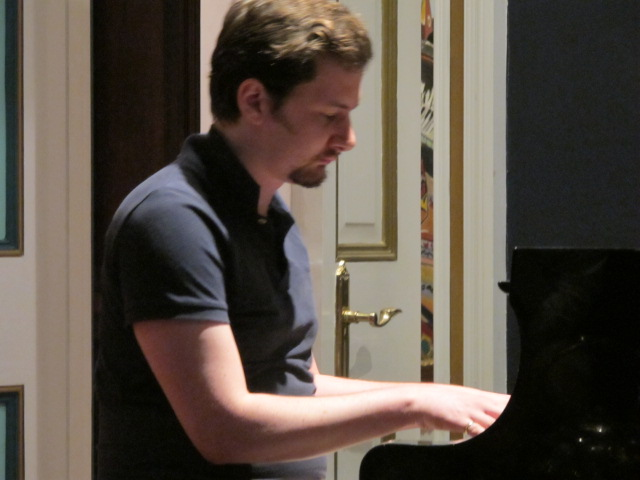
Joel Garten playing piano

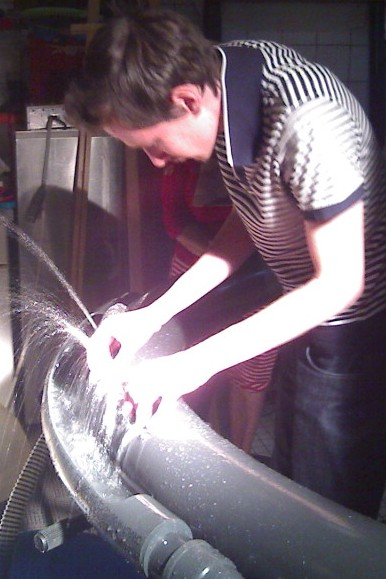
Joel Garten playing hydraulophone

Joel Garten (born 1981) is a pianist and improviser known for his innovative improvisations. His music is influenced by classical music and jazz, but mostly by modern composers such as Morton Feldman, jazz improviser Keith Jarrett and modern artists such as Jackson Pollock and Clyfford Still. Most of his piano works are entirely improvisational and reflect a remarkably personal connection to his music. His work is noted by critics as being deeply reflective and heartfelt. There are those who also draw comparisons to the music of Cecil Taylor. Joel Garten has created a number of innovative works for prepared piano using paint brushes and other hardware on the strings of the piano.

He studied experimental music under the tutelage of Toronto composer Martin Arnold. Garten's music was first produced by Jaymz Bee, a popular music producer and radio personality on JAZZ.FM91. He has performed in a number of cities in North America, as well as in the Registan in Samarkand, Uzbekistan. He was also invited by rock musician Bryan Adams to perform at his studio The Warehouse, where Garten performed an hour-long concert of his solo piano improvisations in 1999. Garten was also commissioned to write a work for Toronto's 200th birthday which he performed at Toronto's Casa Loma.

Garten was a curator in 2006 at an exhibit in the Echigo Tsumari Triennial in Japan, the largest international art exhibit in Japan. In addition to his art curation at the Triennial, he wrote compositions that were inspired by his study of local folk music, which he performed in a solo piano concert in Hachi, Japan. He later performed these works in another solo piano concert at the Japan Foundation, Toronto. Garten performed an hour-long solo piano improvised concert at the Tenri Cultural Institute in 2010. He was also a member of the Board of Directors of The Music Gallery, one of Toronto's premier New Music performance venues.

"Joel’s multi-layered music sweeps you away. He paints rich and mysterious mental landscapes and magically creates awesome sculptural shapes in your mind’s eye that continually transform and mesmerize... This is like NOTHING you’ve ever heard!" - Jeanne Beker, Fashion Television

== See also ==
- List of free improvising musicians and groups
- Ariel Garten
