= Violin acoustics =

Area of study within musical acoustics

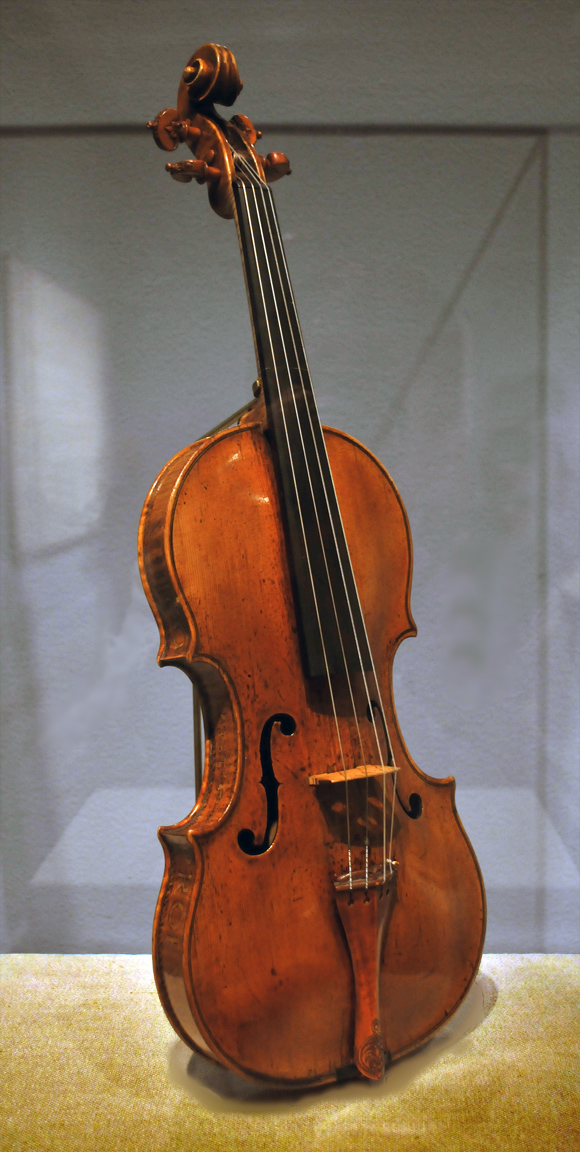
An Andrea Amati violin, which may have been made as early as 1558, making it one of the earliest violins in existence

Violin acoustics is an area of study within musical acoustics concerned with how the sound of a violin is created as the result of interactions between its many parts. These acoustic qualities are similar to those of other members of the violin family, such as the viola.

The energy of a vibrating string is transmitted through the bridge to the body of the violin, which allows the sound to radiate into the surrounding air. Both ends of a violin string are effectively stationary, allowing for the creation of standing waves. A range of simultaneously produced harmonics each affect the timbre, but only the fundamental frequency is heard. The frequency of a note can be raised by the increasing the string's tension, or decreasing its length or mass. The number of harmonics present in the tone can be reduced, for instance by the using the left hand to shorten the string length. The loudness and timbre of each of the strings is not the same, and the material used affects sound quality and ease of articulation. Violin strings were originally made from catgut but are now usually made of steel or a synthetic material. Most strings are wound with metal to increase their mass while avoiding excess thickness.

During a bow stroke, the string is pulled until the string's tension causes it to return, after which it receives energy again from the bow. Violin players can control bow speed, the force used, the position of the bow on the string, and the amount of hair in contact with the string. The static forces acting on the bridge, which supports one end of the strings' playing length, are large: dynamic forces acting on the bridge force it to rock back and forth, which causes the vibrations from the strings to be transmitted. A violin's body is strong enough to resist the tension from the strings, but also light enough to vibrate properly. It is made of two arched wooden plates with ribs around the sides and has two f-holes on either side of the bridge. It acts as a sound box to couple the vibration of strings to the surrounding air, with the different parts of the body all respond differently to the notes that are played, and every part (including the bass bar concealed inside) contributing to the violin's characteristic sound. In comparison to when a string is bowed, a plucked string dampens more quickly.

The other members of the violin family have different, but similar timbres. The viola and the double bass’s characteristics contribute to them being used less in the orchestra as solo instruments, in contrast to the cello (violoncello), which is not adversely affected by having the optimum dimensions to correspond with the pitch of its open strings.

== Historical background ==
The nature of vibrating strings was studied by the ancient Ionian Greek philosopher Pythagoras, who is thought to have been the first to observe the relationship between the lengths of vibrating strings and the consonant sounds they make. In the 16th century, the Italian lutenist and composer Vincenzo Galilei pioneered the systematic testing and measurement of stretched strings, using lute strings. He discovered that while the ratio of an interval is proportional to the length of the string, it was directly proportional to the square root of the tension. His son Galileo Galilei published the relationship between frequency, length, tension and diameter in Two New Sciences (1638). The earliest violin makers, though highly skilled, did not advance any scientific knowledge of the acoustics of stringed instruments.

During the 19th century, the multi-harmonic sound from a bowed string was first studied in detail by the French physicist Félix Savart. The German physicist Hermann von Helmholtz investigated the physics of the plucked string, and showed that the bowed string travelled in a triangular shape with the apex moving at a constant speed.

The violin's modes of vibration were researched in Germany during the 1930s by Hermann Backhaus and his student Hermann Meinel, whose work included the investigation of frequency responses of violins. Understanding of the acoustical properties of violins was developed by F.A. Saunders in the 1930s and 40s, work that was continued over the following decades by Saunders and his assistant Carleen Hutchins, and also Werner Lottermoser, Jürgen Meyer, and Simone Sacconi. Hutchins' work dominated the field of violin acoustics for 20 years from the 1960s onwards, until it was superseded by the use of modal analysis, a technique that was, according to the acoustician George Bissinger, "of enormous importance for understanding [the] acoustics of the violin".

== Strings ==
The sound of the open strings (G, D, A and E) bowed on a violin

The four open strings of any particular violin have the same length from the bridge to the nut of the instrument, but vary in pitch because each string has a different mass per unit length. Both ends of a violin string are essentially stationary when it vibrates, allowing for the creation of standing waves (eigenmodes), caused by the superposition of two sine waves travelling past each other.

Waveform for a violin, the result of combining many simple waves

A vibrating string does not produce a single frequency. The sound may be described as a combination of a fundamental frequency and its overtones, which cause the sound to have a quality that is individual to the instrument, known as the timbre. The timbre is affected by the number and comparative strength of the overtones (harmonics) present in a tone. Even though they are produced at the same time, only the fundamental frequency—which has the greatest amplitude—is heard. The violin is unusual in that it produces frequencies beyond the upper audible limit for humans.

The fundamental frequency and overtones of the resulting sound depend on the material properties of the string: tension, length, and mass, as well as damping effects and the stiffness of the string. Violinists stop a string with a left-hand fingertip, shortening its playing length. Most often the string is stopped against the violin's fingerboard, but in some cases a string lightly touched with the fingertip is enough, causing an artificial harmonic to be produced. Stopping the string at a shorter length has the effect of raising its pitch, and since the fingerboard is unfretted, any frequency on the length of the string is possible. There is a difference in timbre between notes made on an 'open' string and those produced by placing the left hand fingers on the string, as the finger acts to reduce the number of harmonics present. Additionally, the loudness and timbre of the strings is not the same.

The fingering positions for a particular interval vary according to the length of the vibrating part of the string. For a violin, the whole tone interval on an open string is about 1 1/4 inches (31.8 mm)—at the other end of the string, the same interval is less than a third of this size. The equivalent numbers are successively larger for a viola, a cello (violoncello) and a double bass.

A G major scale played by plucking a violin

When the violinist is directed to pluck a string (Ital. pizzicato), the sound produced rapidly dies away, or dampens: the effect is more striking for a violin compared with the other members of the violin family because of its smaller dimensions, and is greater if an open string is plucked. During a pizzicato note, the decaying higher harmonics diminish more quickly than the lower ones.

The vibrato effect on a violin is achieved when muscles in the arm, hand and wrist act to cause the pitch of a note to oscillate. A typical vibrato has a frequency of 6 Hz and causes the pitch to vary by a quarter of a tone.

=== Tension ===
The tension (T) in a stretched string is given by

$$T = ES {\frac {{\Delta}L}{L}}$$

where E is the Young's modulus, S is the cross-sectional area, ΔL is the extension, and L is the string length. For vibrations with a large amplitude, the tension is not constant. Increasing the tension on a string results in a higher frequency note: the frequency of the vibrating string, which is directly proportional to the square root of the tension, can be represented by the following equation:

$$f = {1 \over 2} \sqrt{\frac T{LM}}$$

where f is the fundamental frequency of the string, T is the tension force and M is the mass.

The strings of a violin are attached to adjustable tuning pegs and (with some strings) finer tuners. Tuning each string is done by loosening or tightening it until the desired pitch is reached. The tension of a violin string ranges from 8.7 to 18.7 pounds-force (39 to 83 N).

=== Length ===
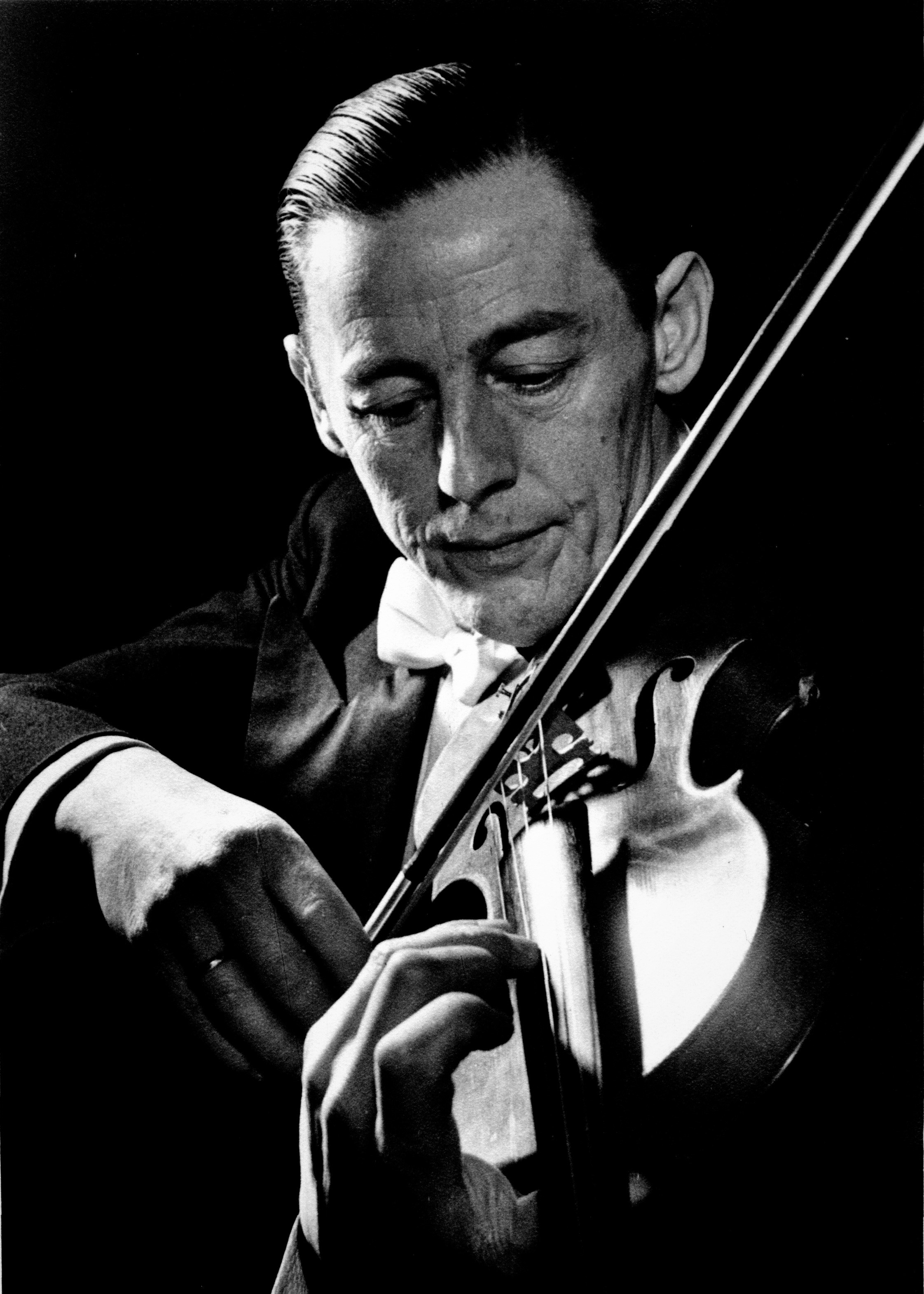
The violinist Erich Donnerhack, shown stopping a string

For any wave travelling at a speed v, travelling a distance λ in one period T,

$$v = {{\lambda} \over T}$$.

For a frequency f

$$f = {\frac 1{T}}= {\frac v{{\lambda}}}$$

For the fundamental frequency of a vibrating string on a violin, the string length is 1/2λ, where λ is the associated wavelength, so

$f = {\frac v{2L}}$.

=== Materials ===
String material influences the overtone mix and affects the quality of the sound. Response and ease of articulation are also affected by choice of string materials.

Violin strings were originally made from catgut, which is still available and used by some professional musicians, although strings made of other materials are less expensive to make and are not as sensitive to temperature. Modern strings are made of steel-core, stranded steel-core, or a synthetic material such as Perlon. Violin strings (with the exception of most E strings) are helically wound with metal chosen for its density and cost. The winding on a string increases the mass of the string, alters the tone (quality of sound produced) to make it sound brighter or warmer, and affects the response. A plucked steel string sounds duller than one made of gut, as the action does not deform steel into a pointed shape as easily, and so does not produce as many higher frequency harmonics.

== The bridge ==
The bridge, which is placed on the top of the body of the violin where the soundboard is highest, supports one end of the strings' playing length. The static forces acting on the bridge are large, and dependent on the tension in the strings: 20 lb_{f} (89 N) passes down through the bridge as a result of a tension in the strings of 50 lb_{f} (220 N). The string 'break' angle made by the string across the bridge affects the downward force, and is typically 13 to 15° to the horizontal.

The bridge transfers energy from the strings to the body of the violin. As a first approximation, it is considered to act as a node, as otherwise the fundamental frequencies and their related harmonics would not be sustained when a note is played, but its motion is critical in determining how energy is transmitted from the strings to the body, and the behaviour of the strings themselves. One component of its motion is side-to-side rocking as it moves with the string. It may be usefully viewed as a mechanical filter, or an arrangement of masses and "springs" that filters and shapes the timbre of the sound.

Since the early 1980s it has been known that high quality violins have vibrated better at frequencies around 2–3 kHz because of an effect attributed to the resonance properties of the bridge, and now referred as the 'bridge-hill' effect.

Muting is achieved by fitting a clip onto the bridge, which absorbs a proportion of the energy transmitted to the body of the instrument. Both a reduction in sound intensity and a different timbre are produced, so that using a mute is not seen by musicians as the main method to use when wanting to play more quietly.

== The bow ==
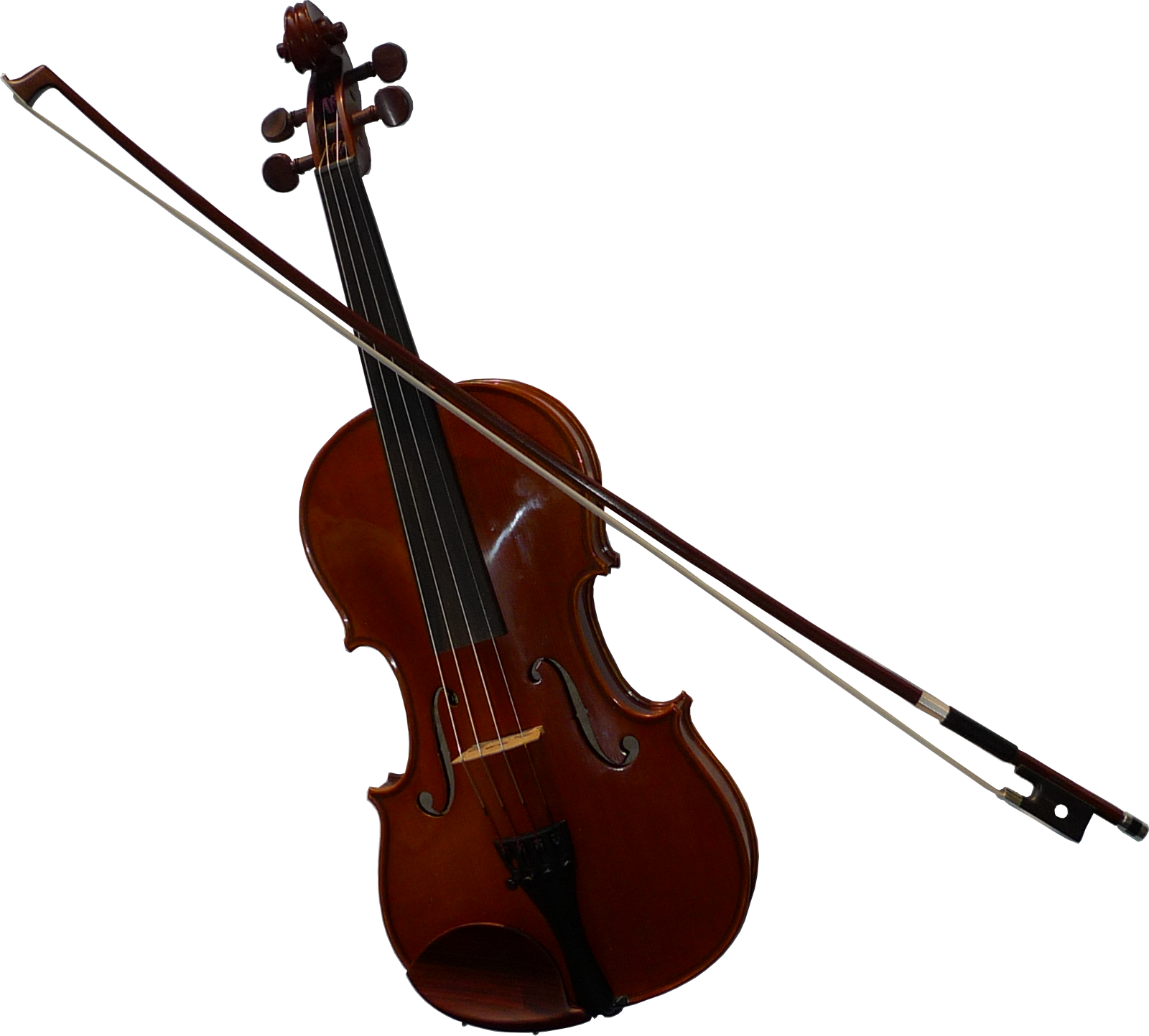
Violin and bow

A violin can sustain its tone by the process of bowing, when friction causes the string to be pulled sideways by the bow until an opposing force caused by the string's tension becomes great enough to cause the string to slip back. The string returns to its equilibrium position and then moves sideways past this position, after which it receives energy again from the moving bow. The bow consists of a flat ribbon of parallel horse hairs stretched between the ends of a stick, which is generally made of Pernambuco wood, used because of its particular elastic properties. The hair is coated with rosin to provide a controlled 'stick-slip oscillation' as it moves at right angles to the string. In 2004, Jim Woodhouse and Paul Galluzzo of Cambridge University described the motion of a bowed string as being "the only stick-slip oscillation which is reasonably well understood".

The length, weight, and balance point of modern bows are standardized. Players may notice variations in sound and handling from bow to bow, based on these parameters as well as stiffness and moment of inertia. A violinist or violist would naturally tend to play louder when pushing the bow across the string (an 'up-bow'), as the leverage is greater. At its quietest, the instrument has a power of 0.0000038 watts, compared with 0.09 watts for a small orchestra: the range of sound pressure levels of the instrument is from 25 to 30dB.

=== Physics of bowing ===
Violinists generally bow between the bridge and the fingerboard, and are trained to keep the bow perpendicular to the string. In bowing, the three most prominent factors under the player's immediate control are bow speed, force, and the place where the hair crosses the string (known as the 'sounding point'): a vibrating string with a shorter length causes the sounding point to be positioned closer to the bridge. The player may also vary the amount of hair in contact with the string, by tilting the bow stick more or less away from the bridge. The string twists as it is bowed, which adds a 'ripple' to the waveform: this effect is increased if the string is more massive.

Bowing directly above the fingerboard (Ital. sulla tastiera) produces what the 20th century American composer and author Walter Piston described as a "very soft, floating quality", caused by the string being forced to vibrate with a greater amplitude. Sul ponticello—when the bow is played close to the bridge—is the opposite technique, and produces what Piston described as a "glassy and metallic" sound, due to normally unheard harmonics becoming able to affect the timbre.

=== Helmholtz motion ===
Helmholtz motion for a bowed violin string: an illustration of Helmholz's diagram of the motion; and a clip showing the 'Helmholtz corner' travelling back and forth

"...The foot d of the ordinate of its highest point moves backwards and forwards with a constant velocity on the horizontal line ab, while the highest point of the string describes in succession the two parabolic arcs ac_{1}b and bc_{2}a, and the string itself is always stretched in the two lines ac_{1} and bc_{1} or ac_{2} and bc_{2}."

— Hermann von Helmholtz, On the Sensations of Tone (1865).

Modern research on the physics of violins began with Helmholtz, who showed that the shape of the string as it is bowed is in the form of a 'V', with an apex (known as the 'Helmholtz corner') that moves along the main part of the string at a constant speed. Here, the nature of the friction between bow and string changes, and slipping or sticking occurs, depending on the direction the corner is moving. The wave produced rotates as the Helmholtz corner moves along a plucked string, which caused a reduced amount of energy to be transmitted to the bridge when the plane of rotation is not parallel to the fingerboard. Less energy still is supplied when the string is bowed, as a bow tends to dampen any oscillations that are at an angle to the bow hair, an effect enhanced if an uneven bow pressure is applied, e.g. by a novice player.

The Indian physicist C. V. Raman was the first to obtain an accurate model for describing the mechanics of the bowed string, publishing his research in 1918. His model was able to predict the motion described by Helmholtz (known nowadays as Helmholtz motion), but he had to assume that the vibrating string was perfectly flexible, and lost energy when the wave was reflected with a reflection coefficient that depended upon the bow speed. Raman's model was later developed by the mathematicians Joseph Keller and F.G. Friedlander.

Helmholtz and Raman produced models that included sharp cornered waves: the study of smoother corners was undertaken by Cremer and Lazarus in 1968, who showed that significant smoothing occurs (i.e. there are fewer harmonics present) only when normal bowing forces are applied. The theory was further developed during the 1970s and 1980s to produce a digital waveguide model, based on the complex relationship behaviour of the bow's velocity and the frictional forces that were present. The model was a success in simulating Helmholtz motion (including the 'flattening' effect of the motion caused by larger forces), and was later extended to take into account the string's bending stiffness, its twisting motion, and the effect on the string of body vibrations and the distortion of the bow hair. However, the model assumed that the coefficient of friction due to the rosin was solely determined by the bow's speed, and ignored the possibility that the coefficient could depend on other variables. By the early 2000s, the importance of variables such as the energy supplied by friction to the rosin on the bow and the player's input into the action of the bow were recognised, showing the need for an improved model.

== The body ==
Structure of a violin

The body of a violin is oval and hollow, and has two f-shaped holes, called sound holes, located on either side of the bridge. The body must be strong enough to support the tension from the strings, but also light and thin enough to vibrate properly. It is made of two arched wooden plates known as the belly and the backplate, whose sides are formed by thin curved ribs. It acts as a sound box to couple the vibration of strings to the surrounding air, making it audible. In comparison, the strings, which move almost no air, are silent.

The existence of expensive violins is dependent on small differences in their physical behaviour in comparison with cheaper ones. Their construction, and especially the arching of the belly and the backplate, has a profound effect on the overall sound quality of the instrument, and its many different resonant frequencies are caused by the nature of the wooden structure. The different parts all respond differently to the notes that are played, displaying what Carleen Hutchins described as 'wood resonances'. The response of the string can be tested by detecting the motion produced by the current through a metal string when it is placed in an oscillating magnetic field. Such tests have shown that the optimum 'main wood resonance' (the wood resonance with the lowest frequency) occurs between 392 and 494 Hz, equivalent to a tone below and above A_{4}.

The ribs are reinforced at their edges with lining strips, which provide extra gluing surface where the plates are attached. The wooden structure is filled, glued and varnished using materials which all contribute to a violin's characteristic sound. The air in the body also acts to enhance the violin's resonating properties, which are affected by the volume of enclosed air and the size of the f-holes.

The belly and the backplate can display modes of vibration when they are forced to vibrate at particular frequencies. The many modes that exist can be found using fine dust or sand, sprinkled on the surface of a violin-shaped plate. When a mode is found, the dust accumulates at the (stationary) nodes: elsewhere on the plate, where it is oscillating, the dust fails to appear. The patterns produced are named after the German physicist Ernst Chladni, who first developed this experimental technique.

Modern research has used sophisticated techniques such as holographic interferometry, which enables analysis of the motion of the violin surface to be measured, a method first developed by scientists in the 1960s, and the finite element method, where discrete parts of the violin are studied with the aim of constructing an accurate simulation. The British physicist Bernard Richardson has built virtual violins using these techniques. At East Carolina University, the American acoustician George Bissinger has used laser technology to produce frequency responses that have helped him to determine how the efficiency and damping of the violin's vibrations depend on frequency. Another technique, known as modal analysis, involves the use of 'tonal copies' of old instruments to compare a new instrument with an older one. The effects of changing the new violin in the smallest way can be identified, with the aim of replicating the tonal response of the older model.

=== The bass bar and the sound post ===
Interior of a violin

A bass bar and a sound post concealed inside the body both help transmit sound to the back of the violin, with the sound post also serving to support the structure. The bass bar is glued to the underside of the top, whilst the sound post is held in place by friction. The bass bar was invented to strengthen the structure, and is positioned directly below one of the bridge's feet. Near the foot of the bridge, but not directly below it, is the sound post.

When the bridge receives energy from the strings, it rocks, with the sound post acting as a pivot and the bass bar moving with the plate as the result of leverage. This behaviour enhances the violin tone quality: if the sound post's position is adjusted, or if the forces acting on it are changed, the sound produced by the violin can be adversely affected. Together they make the shape of the violin body asymmetrical, which allows different vibrations to occur, which causing the timbre to become more complex.

In addition to the normal modes of the body structure, the enclosed air in the body exhibits Helmholtz resonance modes as it vibrates.

=== Wolf tones ===
Bowing is an example of resonance where maximum amplification occurs at the natural frequency of the system, and not the forcing frequency, as the bow has no periodic force. A wolf tone is produced when small changes in the fundamental frequency—caused by the motion of the bridge—become too great, and the note becomes unstable. A sharp resonance response from the body of a cello (and occasionally a viola or a violin) produces a wolf tone, an unsatisfactory sound that repeatedly appears and disappears. A correctly positioned suppressor can remove the tone by reducing the resonance at that frequency, without dampening the sound of the instrument at other frequencies.

== Comparison with other members of the violin family ==
The open strings of a viola

The open strings of a cello

=== Viola ===
The physics of the viola is fundamentally the same as that of the violin, and the construction and acoustics of the cello and the double bass are similar.

The viola is a larger version of the violin, and has on average a total body length of 27 1/4 inches (69.2 cm), with strings tuned a fifth lower than a violin (with a length of about 23 3/8 inches (59.4 cm)). The viola's larger size is not proportionally great enough to correspond to the strings being pitched as they are, which contributes to its different timbre. Violists need to have hands large enough to be able to accomplish fingering comfortably. The C string has been described by Piston as having a timbre that is "powerful and distinctive", but perhaps in part because the sound it produces is easily covered, the viola is not so frequently used in the orchestra as a solo instrument. According to the American physicist John Rigden, the lower notes of the viola (along with the cello and the double bass) suffer from strength and quality. This is because typical resonant frequencies for a viola lie between the natural frequencies of the middle open strings, and are too high to reinforce the frequencies of the lower strings. To correct this problem, Rigden calculated that a viola would need strings that were half as long again as on a violin, which would making the instrument inconvenient to play.

=== Cello ===
The cello, with an overall length of 48 inches (121.9 cm), is pitched an octave below the viola. The proportionally greater thickness of its body means that its timbre is not adversely affected by having dimensions that do not correspond to its pitch of its open strings, as is the case with the viola.

=== Double bass ===
Double bass tuning

The double bass, in comparison with the other members of the family, is more pointed where the belly is joined by the neck, possibly to compensate for the strain caused by the tension of the strings, and is fitted with cogs for tuning the strings. The average overall length of an orchestral bass is 74 inches (188.0 cm). The back can be arched or flat. The bassist's fingers have to stretch twice as far as a cellist's, and greater force is required to press them against the finger-board. The pizzicato tone, which is 'rich' sounding due to the slow speed of vibrations, is changeable according to which of the associated harmonies are more dominant. The technical capabilities of the double bass are limited. Quick passages are seldom written for it; they lack clarity because of the time required for the strings to vibrate. The double bass is the foundation of the whole orchestra and therefore musically of great importance. According to Rigden, a double bass would need to be twice as large as its present size for its bowed notes to sound powerful enough to be heard over an orchestra.

== Bibliography ==
- Beament, James (1997). The Violin Explained: Components, Mechanism, and Sound. Oxford, New York: Oxford University Press. ISBN 978-0-19-816739-6.
- Bucur, Voichita (2018). Handbook of Materials for String Musical Instruments. AG Switzerland: Cham Springer International Publishing. ISBN 978-3-319-81191-8.
- Chisholm, Hugh, ed. (1886). "Double bass" . Dictionary of National Biography. Vol. 8. London: Smith, Elder & Co.
- Farga, Franz (1969). Violins and Violinists. New York: F. A. Praeger. OCLC 68030679.
- Galilei, Galileo (1914) [1638]. Dialogues Concerning Two New Sciences. Translated by Crew, Henry; de Salvio, Alfonso. New York: Dover Publications Inc. OCLC 708455337.
- Hutchins, Carleen Maley (1978). The Physics of Music. San Francisco: W.H. Fremman and Company. ISBN 978-0-7167-0095-1. (registration required)
- Helmholtz, Hermann L. F. von (1895). Ellis, Alexander J. (ed.). On the Sensations of Tone as a Physiological basis for the Theory of Music (translation of the 1877 German edition) (3rd ed.). London, New York: Longmans, Green and Co. OCLC 1453852.
- Hutchins, Carleen Maley The Acoustics of Violin Plates. Scientific American, vol 245, No. 4. Oct 1981
- Olson, Harry F. (1967). Music, Physics and Engineering. New York: Dover Publications. ISBN 978-0-486-31702-1.
- Piston, Walter (1976). Orchestration (7th ed.). London: Victor Gollancz Ltd. OCLC 1016330383.
- Rigden, John S (1977). Physics and the Sound of Music. New York: Wiley. ISBN 978-0-471-87412-6.
- Siminoff, Roger H. (2002). The Luthier's Handbook: A Guide to Building Great Tone in Acoustic Stringed Instruments. Milwaukee: Hal Leonard Corp. ISBN 978-0-634-01468-0.
- Rossing, Thomas, ed. (2014). Springer Handbook of Acoustics. New York: Springer. ISBN 978-0-387-30446-5.
- Wishart, Trevor (1996). Emmerson, Simon (ed.). On Sonic Art. Amsterdam: OPA. ISBN 978-3-7186-5847-3.
- Wood, Alexander (1944). The Physics of Music. London: Methuen & Co. Ltd. OCLC 640010938.
- Woodhouse, J.; Galluzzo, P.M. (2004). "The Bowed String As We Know It Today" (PDF). Acta Acustica. 90: 579–589. Archived from the original (PDF) on 26 January 2021.
