= Bass-bar =

Bass-bar may refer to:

- Bass bar, a brace running from the foot of the neck to a position under the bridge in many string instruments
- Short for bass-baritone, a singing voice
