= Ro-Pat-In Corporation =

American musical instrument manufacturer

Ro-Pat-In Corporation (ElectRo-Patent-Instruments) was founded by Adolph Rickenbacher and George Beauchamp in 1931 to manufacture and distribute electrically amplified musical instruments. Beauchamp designed the instruments, assisted by Paul Barth and Harry Watson from National String Instrument Corporation. Ro-Pat-In would eventually develop into Rickenbacher and ultimately: Rickenbacker a leader manufacturer in musical instruments, who is still active today. Early examples from Ro-Pat-In bear the brand name Electro.

== Early history ==
At the end of 1931, Beauchamp, Barth, Rickenbacher and several other individuals banded together and formed the Ro-Pat-In Corporation (elektRO-PATent-INstruments) to manufacture and distribute electrically amplified musical instruments, with an emphasis on their newly developed A-25 Hawaiian Guitar, often referred to as the "fry-pan" lap-steel electric guitar as well as an Electric Spanish (standard) model and companion amplifiers. In the summer of 1932, Ro-Pat-In began to manufacture cast aluminum production versions of the Fry-Pan as well as a lesser number of standard Spanish Electrics also known as "Electro-Spanish" models, built from wooden bodies similar to those made in Chicago for the National Company. These instruments constitute the origin of the electric guitar by virtue of their string-driven electro-magnetic pick-ups. In 1933 the Ro-Pat-In company's name was changed to Electro String Instrument Corporation and its instruments labeled simply as "Electro". In 1934 the name of Rickenbacker" was added in honor of the company's principal partner, Adolph Rickenbacher.
