= Stars and Their Guitars: A History of the Electric Guitar =

2008 documentary film

Stars and Their Guitars: A History of the Electric Guitar is a 2008 documentary film by Kent Hagen. It spotlights the development and history of the classic electric guitar as well as certain players who made them famous. Covering of genres including rock, blues, rockabilly, country, hard rock, and punk it presents interviews with Les Paul, B.B. King, Duane Eddy, Scotty Moore, Billy Gibbons, Slash, George Thorogood, Joe Satriani, and Elliot Easton. The film was the Winner for best documentary at the 2008 Route 66 Film Festival.

== Reception ==
Kerry Doole, in his review for Exclaim! was critical of the film and wrote, "A so-called "history" of the electric guitar that doesn't include interviews with Jimmy Page, Eric Clapton, Jeff Beck or Pete Townshend but spotlights corporate rockers like Neal Schon (Journey), Steve Lukather of Toto (featured way too much here) and Mick Jones (the Foreigner one, not the Clash guy) is rather lacking in credibility."
