= Sound post =

Part inside a stringed instrument

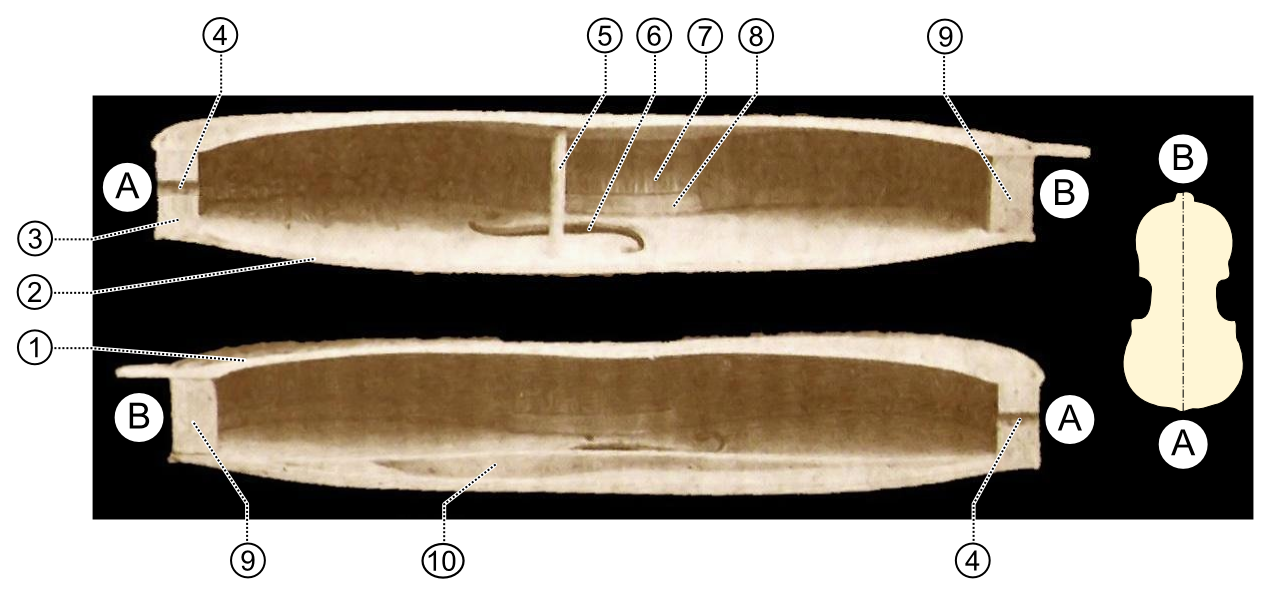
The sound post is the piece marked 5.

In a string instrument, the sound post or soundpost is a dowel inside the instrument under the treble end of the bridge, spanning the space between the top and back plates and held in place by friction. It serves as a structural support for an archtop instrument, transfers sound from the top plate to the back plate and alters the tone of the instrument by changing the vibrational modes of the plates.

The sound post is sometimes referred to as the âme, a French word meaning "soul". The bow has also been referred to as the soul of these instruments. The Italians use the same term, anima, for this.

Sound posts are used:

- In all members of the violin family
- In some members of the viol family
- In some archtop guitars
- In other string instruments

== Sound post adjustment ==
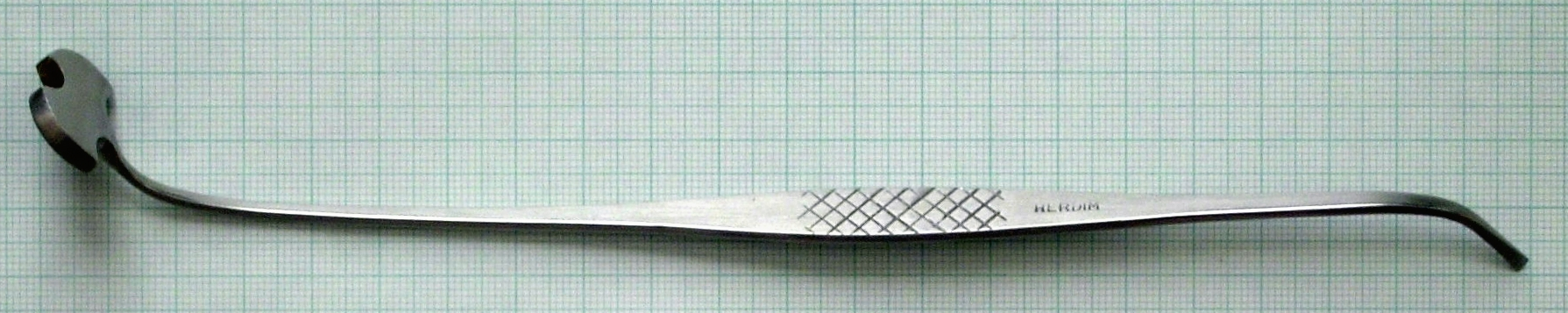
Sound post setting tool

The position of the sound post inside a violin is critical, and moving it by very small amounts (as little as 0.25 – 0.50 mm, or less) can make a big difference in the sound quality and loudness of an instrument. Specialized tools for standing up or moving a sound post are commercially available. Often the pointed end of an S-shaped setter is sharpened with a file and left rough, to grip the post a bit better.

Soundpost adjustment is as much art as science, depending on the ears, experience, structural sense, and sensitive touch of the luthier. The rough guidelines in the following section outline the effects of various moves, but the interaction of all the factors involved keeps it from being a simple process. Moving the sound post has very complex consequences on the sound. In the end, it is the ear of the person doing the adjusting that determines the desired location of the post.

== Effect of position on the instrument ==
Moving the sound post towards the fingerboard tends to increase brilliance and loudness. Moving the sound post towards the tail piece decreases the loudness and adds a richness or hollowness to the tonal quality of the instrument. Moving it towards the outside of the instrument increases brightness and moving in towards the middle of the instrument increases the lower frequencies. There is very little room to move the post from side to side without fitting a new post (or shortening the existing one) since tension (how firmly the post is wedged between top and back) plays an important role in tone adjustment. Perfect wood-to-wood fit at both ends of the post is critical to getting the desired sound.

== See also ==
- Bass bar
