= Mute (music) =

Device attached to musical instrument to change its sound

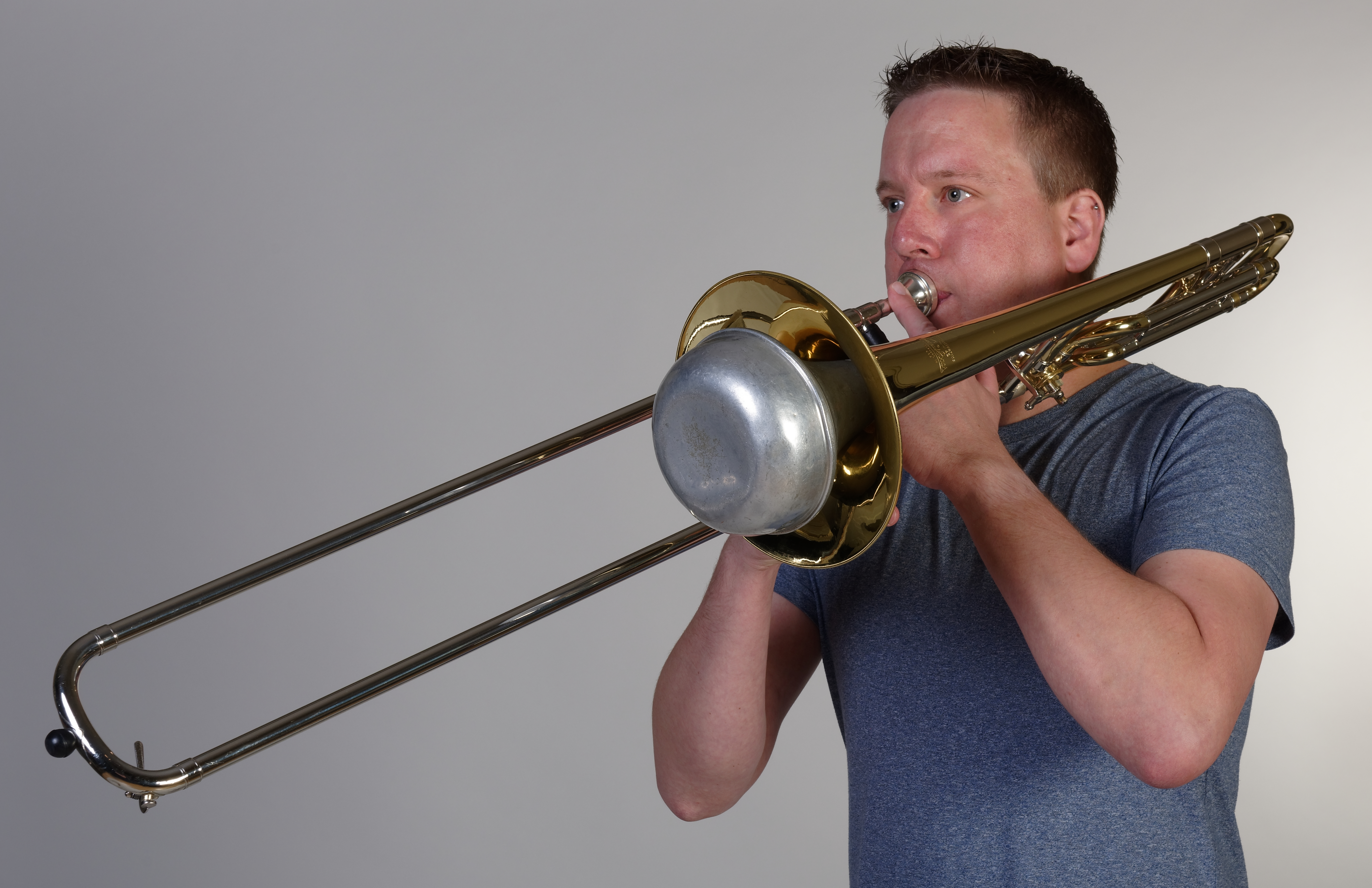
Trombonist playing with a straight mute, the most common brass mute

A mute is a device attached to a musical instrument which changes the instrument's tone quality (timbre) or lowers its volume. Mutes are commonly used on string and brass instruments, especially the trumpet and trombone, and are occasionally used on woodwinds. Their effect is mostly intended for artistic use, but they can also allow players to practice discreetly. Muting can also be done by hand, as in the case of palm muting a guitar or grasping a triangle to dampen its sound.

Mutes on brass instruments are typically inserted into the flared end of the instrument (bell). They can also be held in front of or clipped onto the bell. Of brass mutes, the "straight mute" is the most common and is frequently used in classical and jazz music, but a wide variety are available. On string instruments of the violin family, mutes are usually attached to the bridge, the piece of wood that supports the strings. Palm muting a guitar involves placing the side of the hand across the strings, and some of them have physical mutes which produce a similar effect. Pianos have a soft pedal and occasionally a practice pedal, which both decrease the instrument's volume.

== Overview ==
According to The New Grove Dictionary of Music and Musicians, a mute is a "device used on a musical instrument to modify its timbre by reducing the intensity of certain partials and amplifying others". More generally, it refers to "any of various devices used to muffle or soften the tone of an instrument". The act of using a mute is called "muting". Brass mutes are occasionally referred to as "dampers", but "damping" usually means reducing or deadening the sound after it has been played.

Mutes can be used artistically and for practical purposes. They are used in several genres of music: violin mutes have been used in classical music since at least the seventeenth century, and many types of brass mutes are used in jazz. A common misconception is that muting has the sole purpose of decreasing volume, but this is only true of practice mutes; string instruments in particular can easily play softly without additional equipment.

=== Notation ===
Musical notation directing players to mute and unmute their instruments varies. The type of mute and when to add and remove is specified in text above the music; open is often used in music for brass to indicate the subsequent passage should be played without a mute. In classical music, the phrase con sordino or con sordini (Italian: with mute, abbreviated con sord.), directs players to use a straight mute on brass instruments, and mount the mute on string instruments. The corresponding senza sordino indicates removing the mute. Synonyms include avec sourdine and sans sourdine (French); mit Dämpfer and ohne Dämpfer (German). Ample time must be given to allow players to add and remove the mute, though some mutes can be engaged and disengaged quickly.

For hand muting that changes over time, o is used above the music for open (unmuted) and + for closed (muted). For dampening on percussion or harp, the étouffé symbol (resembling a coda symbol) or a diamond-shaped notehead is used.

== Brass ==
Baroque mute illustrated by Marin Mersenne in 1637

Cross-sectional diagram of six common trumpet mutes: Trumpet bell Cork Mute Absorbent material (bucket only)

Mutes are widely used on brass instruments to alter their timbre. They are often directly inserted into the instrument's bell, but can also be clipped or held onto the end of the bell. Mutes of various types are available in many sizes for all brass instruments, including the tuba; trumpet and trombone players have the widest selection of mutes. They are made of a variety of materials, including fiber, plastic, cardboard, and metal (usually aluminum, brass, or copper). In general, mutes soften the lower frequencies of the sound because they nearly close the bell, but accentuate higher ones due to resonances within the mute.

Stoppers for natural trumpets (the predecessor of the modern valved trumpet) were found in the tomb of King Tutankhamun dating to around 1300 BC, but they were most likely for protecting the instrument from moisture or damage during transport. The earliest known mention of trumpet mutes dates to a 1511 account of a carnival in Florence. Claudio Monteverdi's 1607 opera L'Orfeo opens with a muted trumpet ensemble, which musicologist Wolfgang Osthoff suggests is because the piece was first performed in a small, intimate chamber. These early mutes, known as Baroque mutes, were fashioned from wood and had a hole in the center to permit airflow. They raised the pitch by a semitone or more when inserted, which could be corrected by adding a piece of tubing of appropriate length, known as a crook. Besides musical use, Baroque mutes were used for secret military retreat, funerals, and practice.

The modern straight mute was in widespread use by 1897, being used on tubas in Richard Strauss's Don Quixote. Until the 20th century it was the only mute commonly used in orchestras, but new mutes were eventually invented to create novel, unique timbres, largely for the works of jazz composers. Jazz big band composer Sammy Nestico wrote that mutes can "inject a much needed color change into an arrangement". A well-known example of brass mute usage is the "voice" of adults in The Peanuts Movie, which is actually the sound of a muted trombone.

=== Straight ===
Metal straight mute on B♭ trumpet

Pixie mute on B♭ trumpet

The straight mute is roughly a truncated cone closed at the end facing outwards from the instrument, with three cork pads at the neck to allow sound to escape through the space between the bell and the mute. The mute acts as a high-pass filter. In trumpets, it lets through frequencies above about 1800 Hz, producing a shrill, piercing sound that can be penetrating at high volumes. Straight mutes made of materials like plastic or fiberglass are generally darker and less forceful in sound than their metal (usually aluminum) counterparts. The straight mute is among the few that can be played at a true forte dynamic.

The most commonly used brass mute in classical music, straight mutes for trumpet (and sometimes trombone) are also used in jazz. It is the only type of tuba mute regularly used and is available for all brass instruments. In classical music, when the mute type is not specified, it is assumed that the player should use a straight mute. Sammy Nestico wrote that straight mutes can "shade and soften vocal backgrounds", but opined that they were "a bit harsh".

The pixie mute is a thinner straight mute inserted further into the bell, and is most commonly used along with a plunger for special effects. The name is trademarked by the Humes & Berg Company, but is widely used to refer to similar mutes from other makers.

=== Cup ===
Cup mute on B♭ trumpet

The cup mute is similar to a straight mute, but includes an extra inverted cone on the end opening towards the bell of the instrument. Mostly used in jazz and on trumpet or trombone, it has a more subdued and darker tone than the straight mute. Although it is primarily used in big band jazz, some ballroom orchestras use the technique mostly for swing dance music, but also waltzes and other traditional ballroom dances. The cup mute in trumpets acts as a band-pass filter, permitting frequencies between 800 and 1200 Hz. The distance between the cup and the end of the bell is adjustable in some cup mutes: a half-closed mute permits more air to escape and thus more volume, while a fully-closed mute produces a quiet tone and is therefore mostly used soloistically.

Variants of the cup mute include the mic-a-mute and the buzz-wow mute. The mic-a-mute, so named because it is usually played close to a microphone, has a rubber rim on the cup and felt lining on the inside, creating a richer sound. The buzz-wow mute has resonators on the end which produce a buzzing effect, similar to a kazoo.

=== Harmon ===
"Stem out"

"Stem in"

"Half-stem"

"Wa-wa" effect, stem in

The harmon mute, also known as the wa-wa, wow-wow, or wah-wah mute, is available for trumpet and trombone and is mainly used in jazz. Unlike the cup and straight mutes, it has a cork that completely blocks airflow around the mute. Instead, air must go into the harmon mute's chamber and escape out a hole, which protrudes into the mute. A "stem" (a tube with a small cup) may be inserted into the mute, which changes the instrument's sound and path of airflow. The mute is made of metal (usually aluminum or copper) and has a cylindrical or bulbous shape; mutes of the latter type are sometimes called "bubble mutes".

Depending on the stem's presence and position, the mute has a variety of sounds. In trumpets, the mute without a stem ("stem out") acts as a band-pass filter permitting frequencies between 1500 and 2000 Hz, making a subdued, distant sound. Playing with the stem fully inserted ("stem in") produces a unique, penetrating sound, while playing with the stem halfway out ("half-stem") has characteristics of both "stem in" and "stem out" playing. Players can also move their hand in front of the mute to produce a "wa-wa" effect by alternately closing and opening the bell.

An early version of the harmon mute was patented by John F. Stratton in 1865, and the mute in its modern form was patented in 1925 by George Schluesselburg. The name derives from Patrick T. "Paddy" Harmon, who financed Schluesselburg and was assigned half of the interest of Schluesselburg's patent. Harmon's interest in the mute came from his hiring black jazz bands—whose trumpeters sometimes used a predecessor of the mute—to play at his Arcadia and Dreamland ballrooms in Chicago. The harmon mute was originally always played with stem inserted. In 1946, jazz trumpeter Miles Davis pioneered the usage of the mute with stem removed, which became part of his trademark sound. Some trumpeters believe that dents on the mute's chamber improve sound and intonation. An acoustical study at the University of Puget Sound found that large dents led to a "weaker" tone and a degradation in tone quality, while small dents could improve tone and amplify the sound.

=== Stopping ===
French horn players can use standard mutes, but often use their hand to mute the sound, a technique known as stopping. By inserting their hand fully into the instrument, airflow is limited, producing a quiet and nasal sound. The shortening of the air column raises the pitch by approximately one semitone, so the player must adjust by playing a semitone lower. The technique was developed and popularized by Anton Joseph Hampel in the mid-18th century. He also invented physical stop mutes for the French horn, which now come in both transposing and non-transposing variants; the latter does not require the player to change their fingerings as they would when hand-stopping.

=== Other ===
==== Solotone ====
The solotone mute consists of two telescoping cones and a small tube in the center, all made of cardboard. It is structurally similar to a harmon mute, but has a cardboard tube in the middle. It has a more intense sound than the harmon mute and has a characteristic "megaphone-like" quality. Other names for the mute include the Cleartone mute, doppio sordino, double mute, and Mega mute. An example of the mute's use in classical music is in Béla Bartók's Violin Concerto No. 2, composed in 1937–1938.

==== Bucket ====
Bucket mute on B♭ trumpet

The bucket mute, also known as the velvetone or velvet-tone, resembles a bucket attached to the outside of the bell. The mute is filled with absorbent material which dampens the sound, resulting in a "covered" sound similar to that of a French horn. The mute can be clipped to the rim of the bell, but a model manufactured by Jo-Ral Mutes is instead inserted into the bell. Originating with early jazz trumpeters who held empty lard cans in front of their instruments, the first bucket mute was made by William McArthur in 1922.

==== Plunger ====
Plunger on B♭ trumpet

The plunger is held in front of the bell. It can be held stationary, which produces a dull tone, but can also be moved, producing various sound effects. Skillful usage can produce speech-like sounds, and short, loud notes while holding the plunger close to the bell produce "exploding" tones. The plunger is often used in conjunction with growling or with a straight mute (or both). Trumpeters and trombonists typically use the head of a sink plunger and toilet plunger respectively, but metal plunger mutes are also produced commercially. If a household plunger is used, some players recommend drilling a hole in the middle of it to adjust the sound, though this practice is controversial.

==== Derby (hat) ====
The derby or hat is a bowler hat or similarly shaped object held in front of the bell, like the plunger. Alternatively, it can be attached to a player's music stand and the trumpet pointed into it. Its larger depth means that it does not distort the trumpet's sound, but does reduce its volume. A similar effect can also be achieved with a piece of felt or thick cloth that covers the bell.

==== Whispa and practice mutes ====
The softest mute intended for musical use, the whispa or whisper mute traps sound in a chamber filled with absorbent material, and only a small amount is allowed to escape through small holes on the chamber. The mute is difficult to play, especially in the upper register. Practice mutes, available for most brass instruments, can be used during practice to prevent bothering others; whispa mutes can also be used as practice mutes. Electronic systems also exist that allow players to hear themselves through earphones.

== Woodwinds ==
Mutes are not very effective on woodwind instruments because the proportion of sound emitted from the bell varies, meaning the degree of muting changes with the fingering. Furthermore, blocking the open end of a woodwind prevents the lowest note from being played. Mutes have very occasionally been used, however, for the oboe, saxophone, bassoon, and clarinet.

Early oboe mutes were inserted into the bell and made of cotton wool, paper, sponge or hardwood. They softened and gave a veiled quality to the lower notes of the instrument. Muting the oboe and bassoon is now done by stuffing a cloth, handkerchief or disk of sound-absorbing material into the bell. In saxophones, muting can be done with a cloth or handkerchief, or a velvet-covered ring inserted into the bell; the ringed mute causes the lower notes of the instruments to play flat.

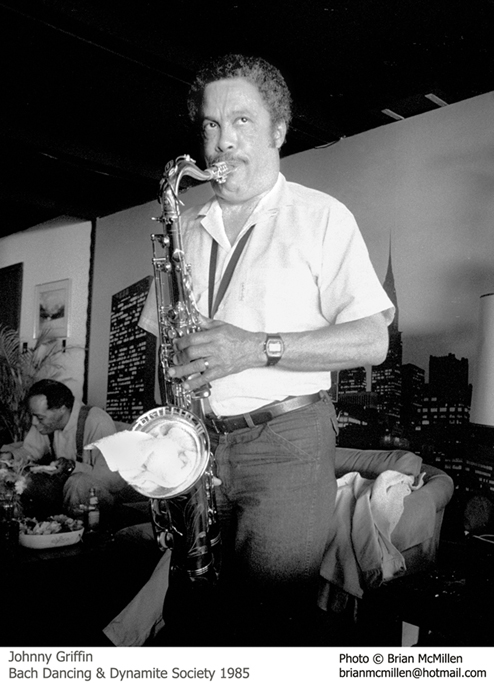
Johnny Griffin with a towel in his tenor saxophone's bell

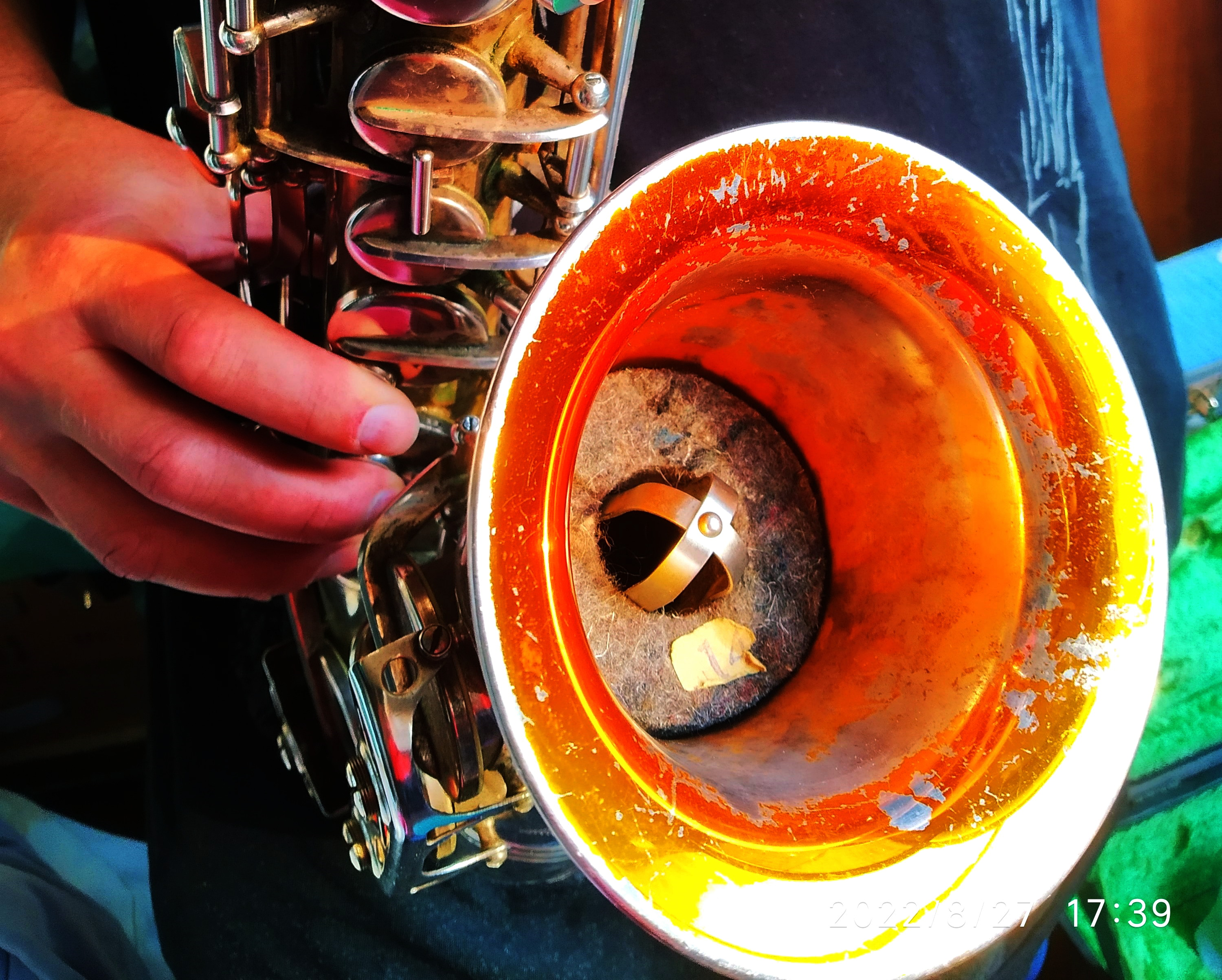
Factory-made saxophone mute #14

== Strings ==
=== Violin family ===
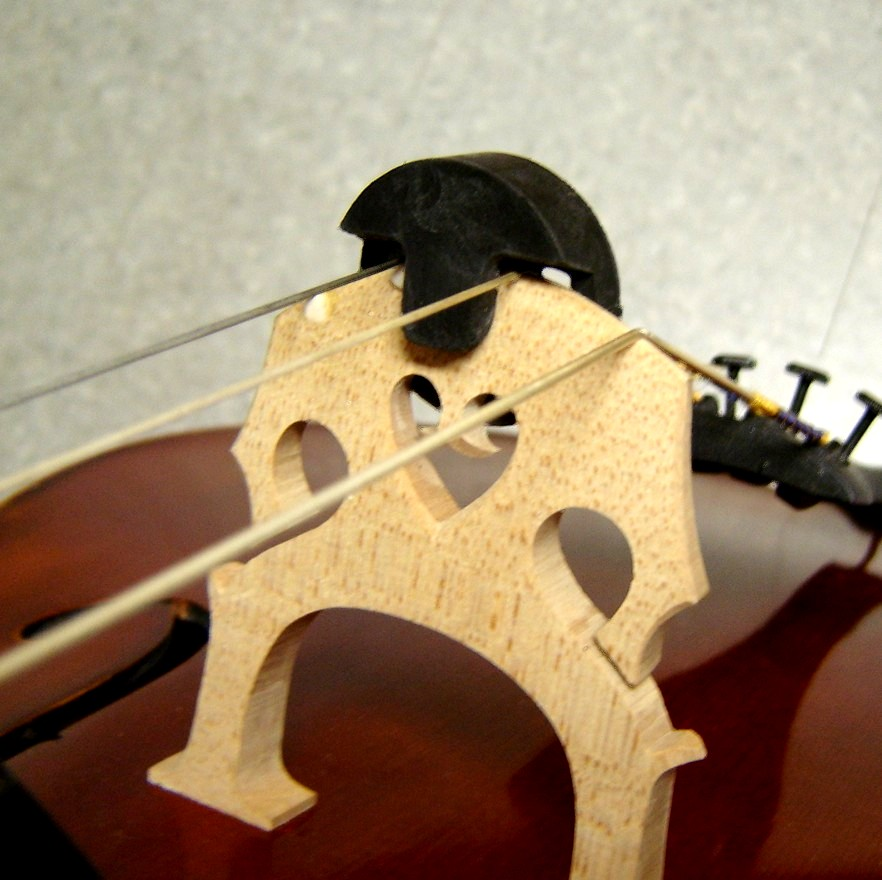
A rubber two-hole Tourte mute on the bridge of a cello

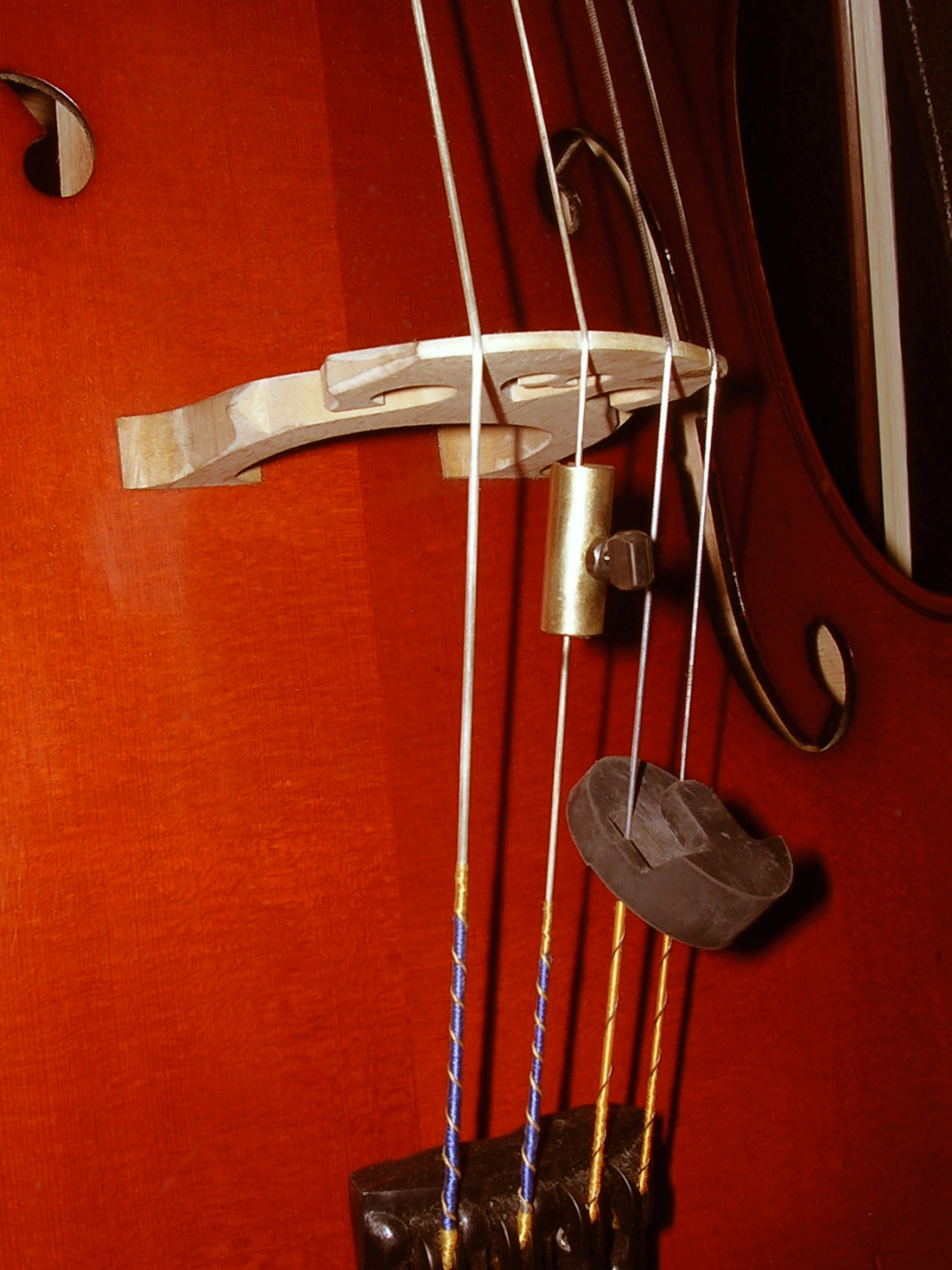
A cello with a Tourte mute (the circular black piece) in off position, and a wolf eliminator (the cylindrical metal piece)

Mutes for string instruments of the violin family work by adding mass to the bridge, or occasionally by dampening the strings behind the bridge. Made of wood, metal, rubber, plastic, or leather, they result in a darker, less brilliant sound because they dampen high-frequency vibrations in the bridge and shift its resonances to lower frequencies. This type of mute was introduced in the 17th century. They are used in performance, to change the tone of the instrument, or during practice, to minimize disturbing others by reducing volume considerably. Practice mutes are generally heavier than performance mutes.

These devices vary widely in their construction, use, and effects on tone. The Heifetz mute, invented by Henryk Kaston and violinist Jascha Heifetz and patented in 1949, allows for adjusting the degree of muting. Placed onto the top of the bridge, it stays on by friction, and may be slid up and down to vary the dampening effect. Some mutes attached to the bridge can be engaged or removed quickly, which is called for in certain modern orchestral works. For example, the popular Tourte and Finissima mutes can be slid along the strings on and off the bridge. The Bech magnetic mute system, with a magnet to secure the mute to the tailpiece when not in use to prevent rattling, is another such mute. There are also wire mutes that can press the strings on the tailpiece side of the bridge, leading to a lessened muting effect.

Practice mutes can be used to heavily dampen stringed instruments to make practicing them in hotels or apartments less intrusive. Metal practice mutes, which are often coated in rubber, have a larger effect than rubber mutes. A practice mute limits the player's ability to hear the effect of the techniques they are working on, so players are advised to spend some practice time without the mute.

==== Wolf eliminator ====
The wolf tone is an undesirable resonance that occurs in string instruments, particularly the cello. A specialized cylindrical metal piece, known as a wolf tone eliminator, can be attached between the bridge and tailpiece of the instrument to adjust the strength and pitch of the problem resonance. Placing a rubber mute similarly can also suppress the wolf tone.

=== Fretted ===
A common technique in rock, metal, funk, and disco music, palm muting a guitar or bass guitar involves placing the side of the hand on the strings. In classical music, this technique is sometimes known as pizzicato effleuré. It reduces the strings' resonance and makes a "dry, chunky sound". Guitars and bass guitars can also have built-in or makeshift dampening devices to simulate the effect of palm muting. The Fender Jaguar guitar, for example, has a spring-loaded strip of foam that presses against the strings when enabled. Some guitars have an individual piece of foam for each string.

== Percussion ==
A triangle played Latin style, opening and closing the hand for rhythmic effect

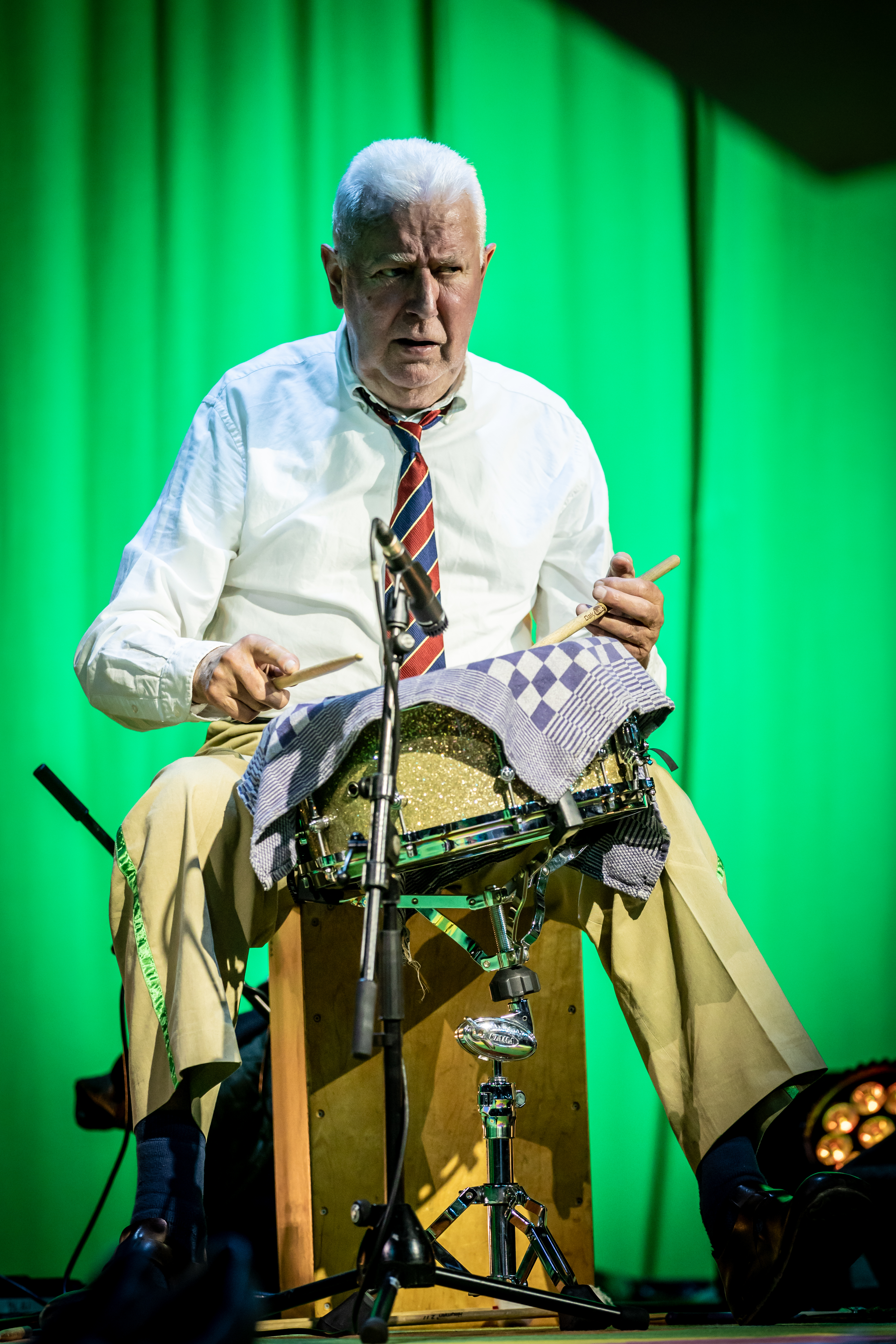
Han Bennink playing a snare drum muted with a towel

Snare drums can be muted with a piece of cloth laid on top, or placed between the snares and the lower membrane. Undesirable ringing overtones can be suppressed by placing a variety of objects on the drumhead, including wallets, self-adhesive pieces of gel, and a circular piece of plastic with the same size as the head. Struck idiophones (e.g. xylophones) can be muted with the hand or a device, which results in short tones lacking resonance; cowbells can be muted by placing a cloth inside them. Maracas and similar shaken idiophones can be muted by holding their chamber instead of their handle.

Some percussion instruments, such as the triangle, timpani, and suspended cymbal, are intended to be muted or dampened by hand. A triangle can also be dampened by placing it inside a sack and striking it from outside. Muting a timpani can be done with a handkerchief, cloth, or piece of felt; the muting device can also be struck directly.

=== Piano ===
No pedal, soft pedal and practice pedal on an upright

The soft pedal, or una corda pedal, decreases the volume of a piano. In grand pianos, this is done by shifting the hammers so that each hammer misses one of the multiple strings used for each note; in uprights, the soft pedal moves the hammers closer to the strings, making a softer impact.

The middle pedal on most pianos is a sostenuto pedal, which does not perform a muting function. On some pianos, however, the middle pedal is a practice pedal, which lowers a piece of felt between the hammers and strings, muffling the sound. The main pedal still has an effect, as the felt is not pressed against the strings except when the hammer strikes. Even quieter than the soft pedal, the practice pedal is intended to be used to prevent bothering others during practice.

== See also ==
- Capo
- Damping (music)
