= Wolf tone =

Phenomenon in musical instruments

A wolf tone, wolf note, or simply a "wolf", is an undesirable phenomenon that occurs in some bowed-string musical instruments, most notoriously in the cello. It happens when the pitch, or more particularly the fundamental frequency, of the played note is close to a particularly strong natural resonant frequency of the vibration of the instrument's body. Wind instruments can produce a similar effect for similar reasons—notably, in the case of brass instruments, when the played note's pitch is near a resonant frequency of the instrument's bell.

A wolf note is hard for the player to control: instead of a solid note it tends to produce a thin "surface" sound, sometimes jumping to the octave of the intended note. In extreme cases, a "stuttering" or "warbling" sound is produced, as in the sound example given below. This sound may be likened to the howling of a wolf. A somewhat similar sound is the beating produced by a wolf interval, which is usually the interval between E♭ and G♯ of the various non-circulating temperaments.

== Stringed instruments ==
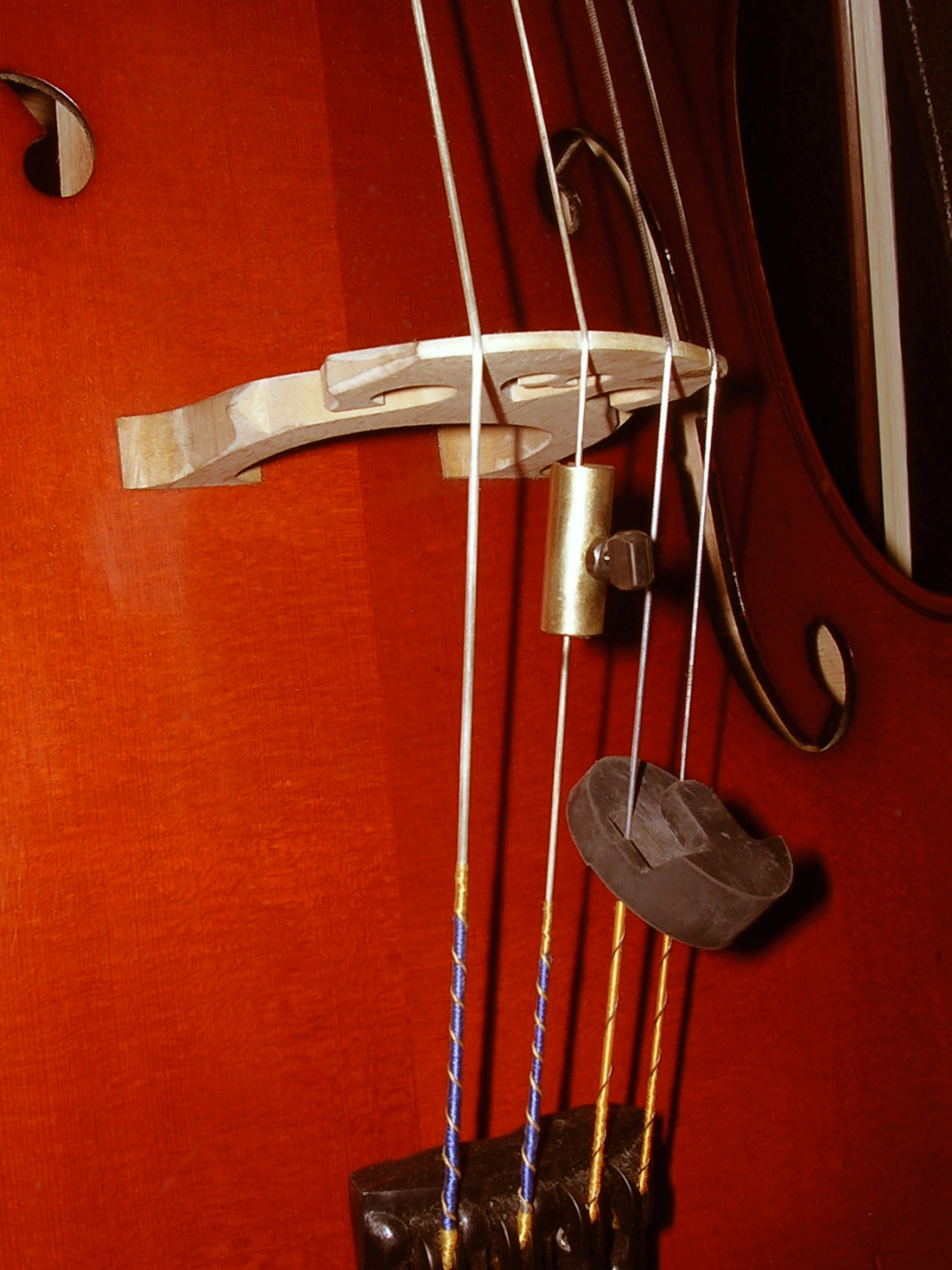
A brass wolf note eliminator typically placed on the G string (second string from the left) of a cello, between the bridge and the tailpiece. (The black rubber piece on the D and A strings (third and fourth from the left) is a mute.)

The physics behind the warbling wolf was first explained by C. V. Raman. He used simultaneous measurements of the vibrating string and the vibrating body of the cello, to show that the warbling sound is caused by an alternation of two different types of string vibration. All bowed string vibration is “stick-slip oscillation”. One of the vibration types involves a single slip in every cycle of the note, but the other type involves two slips per cycle.

Frequently, the wolf is present on or in between the pitches E and F♯ on the cello, and around G♯ on the double bass. A wolf can be reduced or eliminated with a piece of equipment called a wolf note eliminator. There are several types. The one illustrated is a metal tube and mounting screw with an interior rubber sleeve that fits around one of the lengths of string below the bridge. The position of the tube must be adjusted so that the short section of string resonates exactly at the frequency at which the wolf occurs. It works in the same way as a tuned-mass damper, often used to reduce vibration of bridges or tall buildings.

An older device on cellos was a fifth string that could be tuned to the wolf frequency; fingering an octave above or below also attenuates the effect somewhat, as does the trick of squeezing with the knees.

While it has been said that Lou Harrison wrote a piece (evidently reworked as the second movement of the Suite for Cello and Harp) that exploited the wolf specific to Seymour Barab's new cello, there is no clear evidence that this occurred.

"Naldjorlak I", composed by Éliane Radigue for realisation exclusively by the cellist Charles Curtis, is in fact composed solely around the manipulation of the wolf note of Curtis's cello.

== See also ==
Wolf Tone
A wolf tone on a cello

- Mechanical resonance
- String resonance
- Violin acoustics
