= Jim Lill =

American country musician

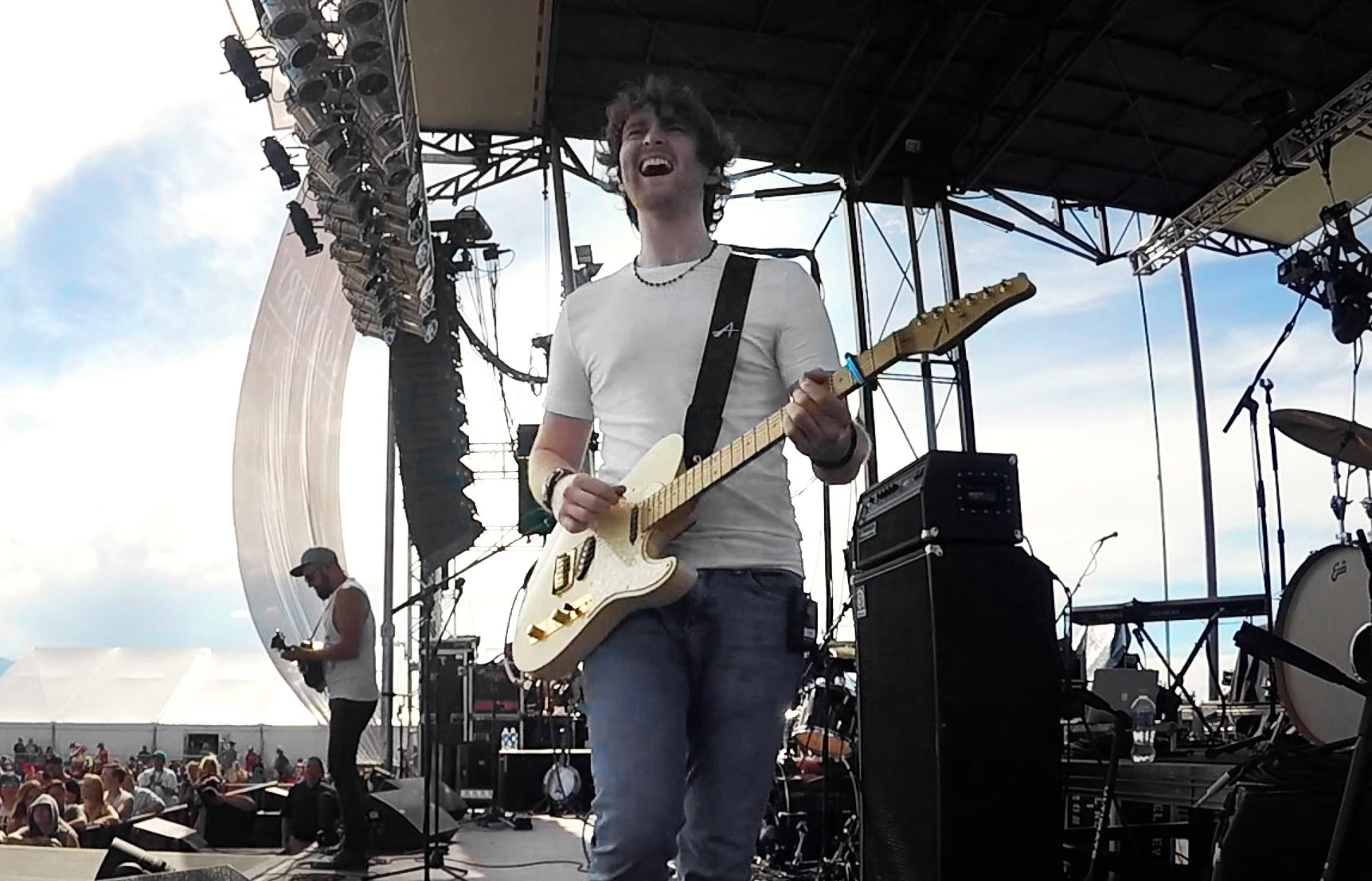
- Lill in 2017

Background information
- Born: Portland, Michigan, United States
- Genres: Country
- Occupations: Musician; Singer; Songwriter
- Instruments: Vocals; Guitar; Bass; Banjo; Pedal Steel; Mandolin; Dobro; Drums
- Years active: 2015–present
- Website: jimlillmusic.com

Jim Lill is an American country musician. He is best known for his YouTube channel where he makes guitar videos. He has been part of the bands of country artists Josh Thompson, Josh Gracin, and Craig Wayne Boyd.

== Early life ==
Jim Lill was born in Portland. He attended Belmont University in Nashville and graduated with a degree in Audio Engineering Technology. He played guitar and other instruments for many country artists during and after college. He interned at Station West Studios where artists including Dierks Bentley and Brad Paisley had albums recorded and mixed. He has contributed to Guitar Player, Guitar World and Premier Guitar.

== YouTube ==
Lill has a YouTube channel in which he explores how different elements of recording, such as guitar components and amplifiers, affect sound. He found that string type, wood type and body shape contributed little or no difference to the guitar sound, and that he could recreate the tone of classic guitar amplifiers with cheap effect pedals.
