= Made in Chicago =

Made in Chicago may refer to:

- Made in Chicago (Jack DeJohnette album), a 2015 live album by Jack DeJohnette
- Made in Chicago (Lalah Hathaway album), a 2026 album by Lalah Hathaway
