= Bass bar =

Lengthwise brace in stringed instruments

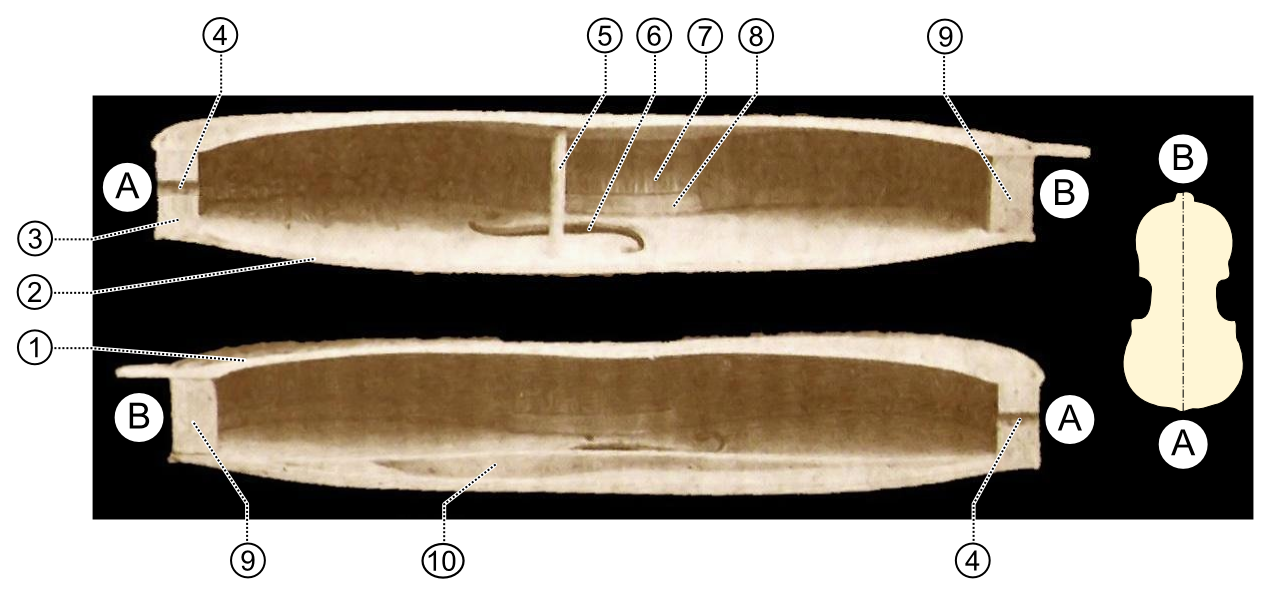
No. 10 is the bass bar.

In a string instrument, the bass bar is a brace running from near the root of the neck, under the bridge's bass foot (in bowed instruments), and extending under much of the top's lower bout. It bears much of the tension of the strings. Bass bars are used:

- In the members of the violin family;
- In the members of the viola da gamba family;
- In some archtop guitars;

and in many other string instruments.

According to the A Dictionary of Music and Musicians by George Grove:

BASS-BAR, an oblong piece of wood, fixed lengthwise inside the belly of the various instruments belonging to the violin-tribe, running in the same direction with the strings, below the lowest string, and acting as a beam or girder to strengthen the belly against the pressure of the left foot of the bridge, as the sound-post does against that of the right foot (in a right handed instrument). It is the only essential part of the instrument which, owing to the gradual elevation of the pitch, has had to undergo an alteration since Stradivari's time. Tartini states, in the year 1734, that the tension of the strings on a violin was equal to a weight of 63 lb (29 kg), while nowadays it is calculated at more than 80 lb (36 kg). (Other modern value: c. 22 kg / 220 N according to string manufacturers' data.) This enormous increase in pressure requires for the belly a proportionate addition of bearing-power, and this could only be given by strengthening the bass-bar, which has been done by giving it a slight additional depth at the centre, and adding considerably to its length. In consequence of this we hardly ever find in an old instrument the original bass-bar of the maker, just as rarely as the original sound-post or bridge, all of which however can be made as well by any experienced living violin-maker as by the original Stradivari or Amati. —P.D.
