= Dalbergia monticola =

Conservation status
- Vulnerable (IUCN 2.3)

Scientific classification
- Kingdom: Plantae
- Clade: Tracheophytes
- Clade: Angiosperms
- Clade: Eudicots
- Clade: Rosids
- Order: Fabales
- Family: Fabaceae
- Subfamily: Faboideae
- Genus: Dalbergia
- Species: D. monticola

Binomial name
- Dalbergia monticola Bosser & Rabevohitra

Species of legume

Dalbergia monticola is a species of flowering plant in the legume family Fabaceae. It is endemic to Madagascar. It occurs at higher elevation, which gave the species its name.

== Description ==
=== Vegetative characters ===
Dalbergia monticola is a deciduous tree up to 30 m tall. The leaves are imparipinnate, 3.5–12 cm long, and have a hairy rachis. The 20–35 alternate leaflets are 0.3–1.7 cm long, mostly glabrous and glossy above, and densely pubescent beneath. The leaflets often become very coriaceous, with strongly revolute margins, when dried on herbarium sheets.

=== Generative characters ===
It forms terminal inflorescences (sometimes also in the upper leaf axils) that are paniculate and around the same length as the subtending leaves. The flowers are white, 5–6 mm long, and have a violin-shaped standard petal and pubescent gynoecium. The fruits contain one to three seeds. The pericarp is net-veined over the entire surface, the network raised but not thickened or fissured over the seeds.

== Similar species ==
- Dalbergia baronii
- Dalbergia pseudobaronii

== Habitat and distribution ==
Dalbergia monticola inhabits evergreen humid mid-altitude forests along the eastern escarpment of Madagascar, extending onto the Central High Plateau as well as onto the Northern Highlands. It occurs at an altitude of around 250–1600 m.

== Uses ==
It produces a durable heartwood that is locally used for cabinet making. It was internationally traded, notably to produce guitar bodies and fingerboards, among other uses.

== Conservation status ==
The IUCN Red List lists Dalbergia monticola as vulnerable. It was considered to be "one of the major components of the oriental forest of Madagascar", but mature individuals are believed to have become rare due to extensive selective logging.

Due to overexploitation and the risk of confusion with similar species, Dalbergia monticola and other Dalbergia species from Madagascar were listed in CITES Appendix II in 2013, currently with a zero export quota.

== See also ==
- Dalbergia maritima, also found only in Madagascar, and similarly threatened.
