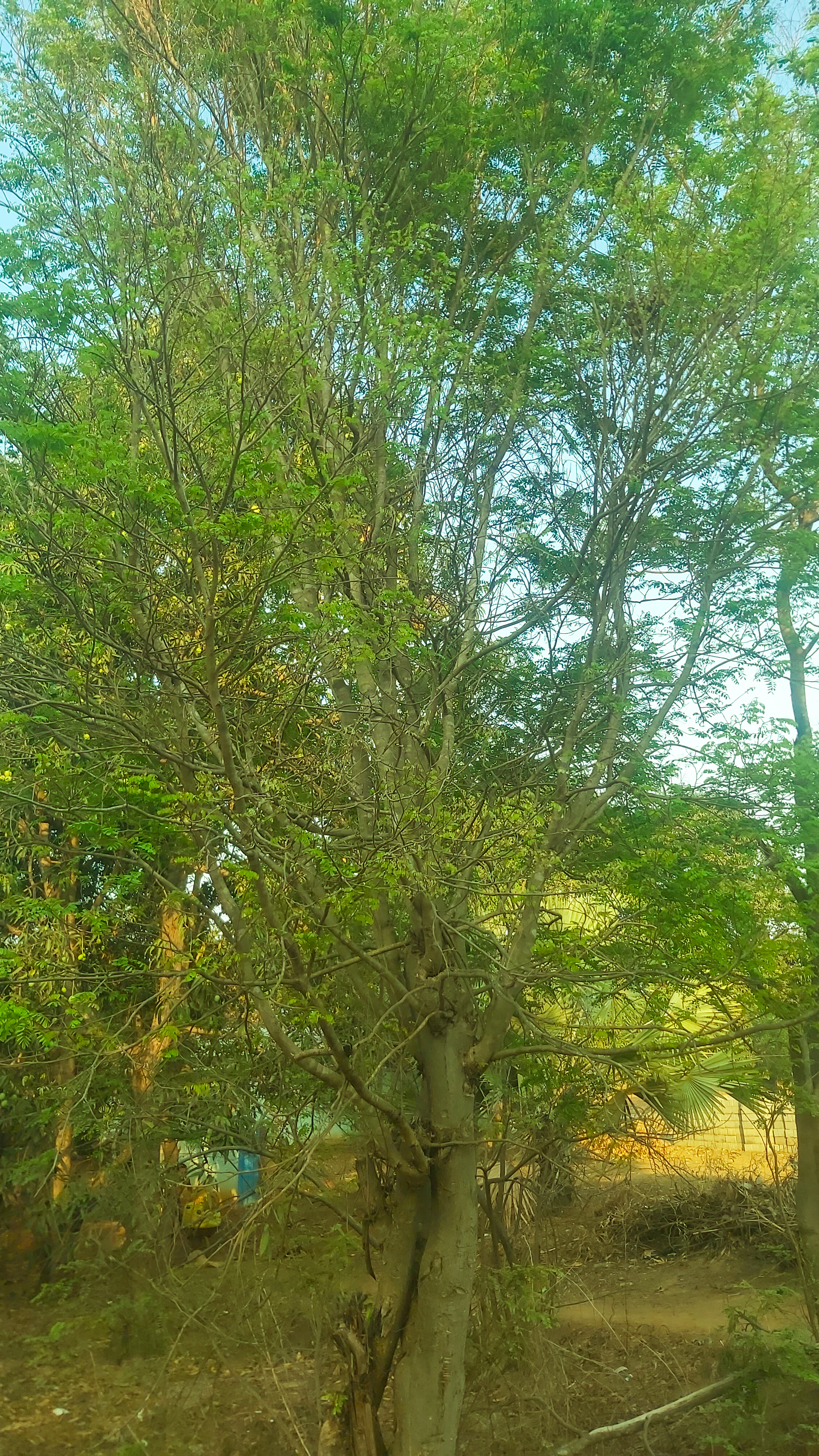

Conservation status
- Vulnerable (IUCN 2.3)

Scientific classification
- Kingdom: Plantae
- Clade: Tracheophytes
- Clade: Angiosperms
- Clade: Eudicots
- Clade: Rosids
- Order: Fabales
- Family: Fabaceae
- Subfamily: Faboideae
- Genus: Dalbergia
- Species: D. baronii

Binomial name
- Dalbergia baronii Baker.

= Dalbergia baronii =

Species of legume

Dalbergia baronii is a species of flowering plant in the legume family Fabaceae. It is endemic to Madagascar. It is named after the English missionary and botanist Rev. Richard Baron.

== Description ==
=== Vegetative characters ===
Dalbergia baronii is a shrub to large tree. The leaves are imparipinnate, 3–7.5 cm long, and have a hairy rachis. The 19–25 alternate leaflets are 0.5–2 cm long, mostly glabrous and glossy above, and with dense and long hairs beneath.

=== Generative characters ===
It forms axillary inflorescences that are paniculate and distinctively shorter than the subtending leaves. The flowers are white, 4–5 mm long, and have a violin-shaped standard petal and pubescent gynoecium. The fruits usually contain one seed (rarely up to three seeds). The pericarp is "indistinctly veined, slightly thickened, corky and fissured over the seed".

== Similar species ==
- Dalbergia monticola
- Dalbergia pseudobaronii

== Habitat and distribution ==
Dalbergia baronii inhabits evergreen lowland forests, marshes and mangrove stands along the East coast of Madagascar. It occurs from sea level up to 150 m, rarely up to an elevation of 600 m.

== Uses ==
It produces a durable, black-striped heartwood that is locally used for cabinet making, furniture and marquetry. It was internationally traded, notably to produce guitar bodies and fingerboards, amongst others.

== Conservation status ==
The IUCN Red List lists Dalbergia baronii as vulnerable. Its natural stands have drastically declined in response to both habitat loss and selective logging. The natural habitat of Dalbergia baronii is among the most threatened Malagasy habitats.

Due to overexploitation and the risk of confusion with similar species, Dalbergia baronii and other Dalbergia species from Madagascar were listed in CITES Appendix II in 2013, currently with a zero export quota.

== See also ==
- Dalbergia maritima, also found only in Madagascar, and similarly threatened.
