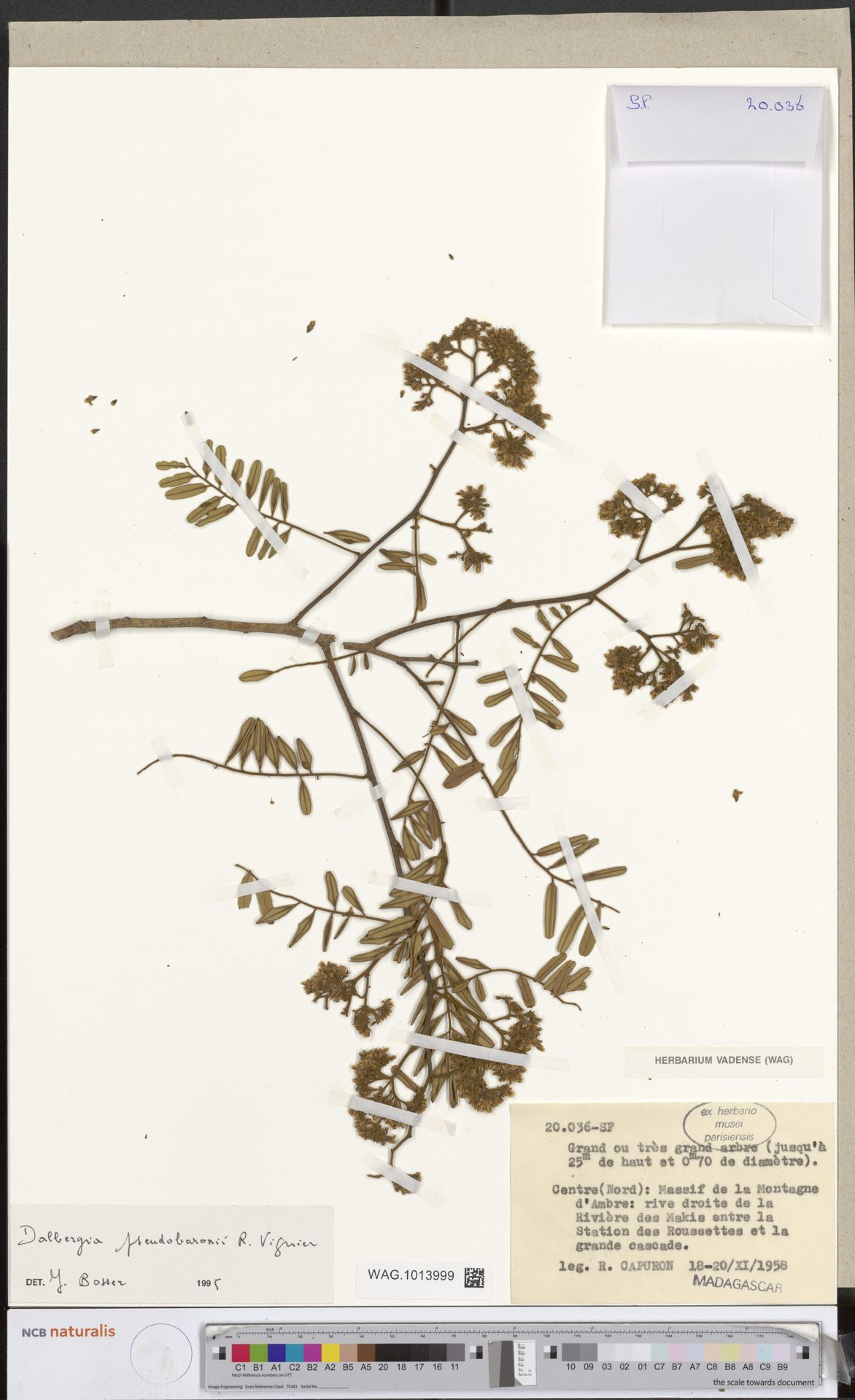

Conservation status
- Vulnerable (IUCN 3.1)

Scientific classification
- Kingdom: Plantae
- Clade: Tracheophytes
- Clade: Angiosperms
- Clade: Eudicots
- Clade: Rosids
- Order: Fabales
- Family: Fabaceae
- Subfamily: Faboideae
- Genus: Dalbergia
- Species: D. pseudobaronii

Binomial name
- Dalbergia pseudobaronii R. Vig.

= Dalbergia pseudobaronii =

Species of legume

Dalbergia pseudobaronii is a species of flowering plant in the legume family Fabaceae. It is endemic to Madagascar. Its leaves are similar to those of Dalbergia baronii, which gave the species its name.

== Description ==
=== Vegetative characters ===
Dalbergia pseudobaronii is a deciduous tree up to 25 m tall. The leaves are imparipinnate, 5–13 cm long, and have a hairy rachis. The 20–35 alternate leaflets are 0.5–2.3 cm long, mostly glabrous and glossy above, and densely pubescent beneath. The leaflets are coriaceous, with revolute margins, when dried on herbarium sheets.

=== Generative characters ===
It forms terminal and axillary inflorescences that are paniculate and shorter than the subtending leaves. The flowers are white becoming yellowish, 4–5.5 mm long, and have a violin-shaped standard petal and pubescent gynoecium. The fruits are up to 12 cm long and 5 cm wide (among the largest in Malagasy Dalbergia), and contain a single seed. The pericarp is "net-veined, thickened, corky and fissured over the seed".

== Similar species ==
- Dalbergia baronii
- Dalbergia humbertii
- Dalbergia monticola

== Habitat and distribution ==
Dalbergia pseudobaronii occurs in the Diana and Sava regions in north Madagascar. It is mainly found along rivers and streams such as the Manajeba, Mahavavy or Manambato rivers. Fruiting collections have been recorded up to an altitude of 300 m.

== Uses ==
It produces a high-quality timber that is locally used for cabinet making.

== Conservation status ==
The IUCN Red List lists Dalbergia pseudobaronii as vulnerable. Habitat loss and selective logging have resulted in population reduction.

Due to overexploitation and the risk of confusion with similar species, Dalbergia pseudobaronii and other Dalbergia species from Madagascar were listed in CITES Appendix II in 2013, currently with a zero export quota.

== See also ==
- Dalbergia maritima, also found only in Madagascar, and similarly threatened.
