= Relief (music) =

Relief, or profile, refers to the amount of curvature in the fingerboard of a guitar or other similar stringed instrument. When the strings of a guitar vibrate, they vibrate in an elliptical shape. Thus, providing the best possible action requires that the guitar fingerboard have a slight curve to allow the strings to vibrate freely. Incorrect relief may cause fret buzz.

To provide adjustable relief, most guitars have an adjustable truss rod. Some guitars, such as certain older Guild 12-strings, have two parallel truss rods. Turning the truss rod screw changes the tension of the truss rod, and thus the relief. Novice players should not attempt this, as the guitar neck can easily be damaged or broken.

As the wood of the guitar neck is affected by temperature and humidity (weather and climate), relief may change with these altering conditions. Compensation for this may be required if fret buzz occurs, by adjusting the truss rod.
