= Dalbergia occulta =

Conservation status
- Critically Endangered (IUCN 3.1)

Scientific classification
- Kingdom: Plantae
- Clade: Tracheophytes
- Clade: Angiosperms
- Clade: Eudicots
- Clade: Rosids
- Order: Fabales
- Family: Fabaceae
- Subfamily: Faboideae
- Genus: Dalbergia
- Species: D. occulta

Binomial name
- Dalbergia occulta Bosser & R.Rabev.

Species of legume

Dalbergia occulta is a species of flowering plant in the legume family Fabaceae. It is a tree endemic to Madagascar. Its original description was based on a single collection, which explains its botanical name (from the Latin word occultus "hidden, concealed").

== Similar species ==
- Dalbergia maritima

== Conservation status ==
The IUCN Red List lists Dalbergia occulta as critically endangered.

Due to overexploitation and the risk of confusion with similar species, Dalbergia occulta and other Dalbergia species from Madagascar were listed in CITES Appendix II in 2013, currently with a zero export quota.
