= Bridge (instrument) =

Part of a stringed instrument

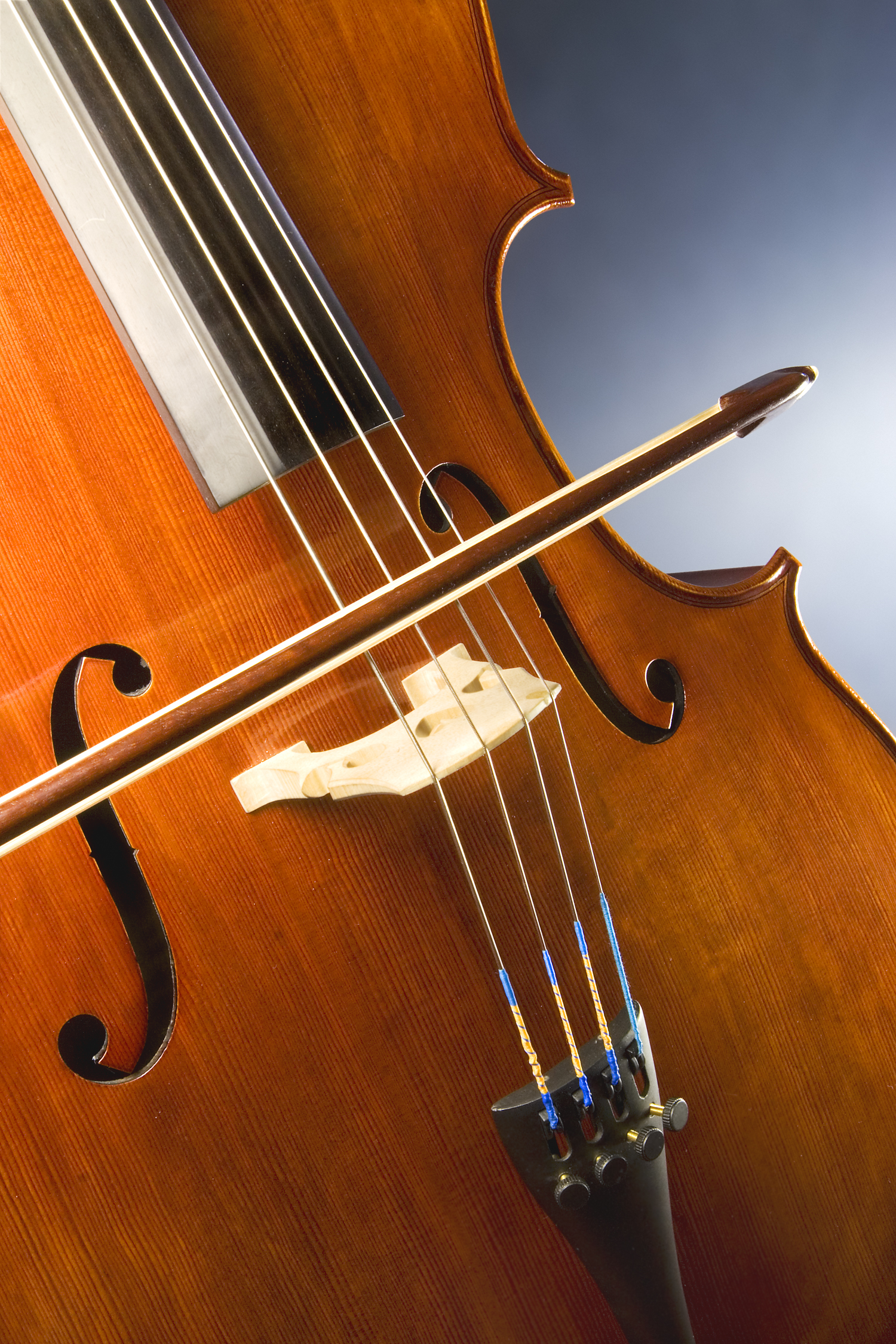
On a cello, the strings are attached to the tailpiece and are held above the soundboard by the bridge.

A bridge is a device that supports the strings on a stringed musical instrument and transmits the vibration of those strings to another structural component of the instrument—typically a soundboard, such as the top of a guitar or violin—which transfers the sound to the surrounding air. Depending on the instrument, the bridge may be made of carved wood (violin family instruments, acoustic guitars and some jazz guitars), metal (electric guitars such as the Fender Telecaster) or other materials. The bridge supports the strings and holds them over the body of the instrument under tension.

== Explanation ==
Most stringed instruments produce sound through the application of energy to the strings, which sets them into vibratory motion, creating musical sounds. The strings alone, however, produce only a faint sound because they displace only a small volume of air as they vibrate. Consequently, the sound of the strings alone requires impedance matching to the surrounding air by transmitting their vibrations to a larger surface area that displaces a larger volume of air (and thus produces louder sounds). This calls for an arrangement that lets the strings vibrate freely, but also conducts those vibrations efficiently to the larger surface. A bridge is the customary means for accomplishing this. The bridge conducts the vibrations of the strings to a hollowed out chamber in a number of instruments (e.g., violin family, acoustic guitar, balalaika).

On electric guitars and electric basses, the bridge conducts the vibrations to the body, but the vibrations of the strings are typically sensed by a magnetic pickup, so that an electric signal is created, which is then connected to a guitar amplifier and a speaker enclosure to produce the sound the performer and audience hears. On electric pianos, the player presses or strikes keys, which cause hammers to strike metal tines. A magnetic pickup senses these vibrations, using the same approach as with an electric guitar (amplifier and speaker).

== Positioning ==
Typically, the bridge is perpendicular to the strings and larger surface (which are roughly parallel to one another) with the tension of the strings pressing down on the bridge and thus on the larger surface beneath it. That larger, more acoustically responsive surface may be coupled to a sound chamber—an enclosure such as the body of a guitar or violin—that provides resonance that helps amplify the sound. Depending on the type of stringed instrument, the resonant surface the bridge rests on may be made of:

- Wood, as the top "plate" piece of wood of a guitar or violin
- Calfskin or plastic under tension, as with a drum, as on the head of a banjo
- Metal, as on certain types of resophonic fretted instruments
- Virtually any material that can vibrate sympathetically with the strings. Some upright basses are made of aluminium. Some violin family instruments are made of carbon fibre.

== Construction ==
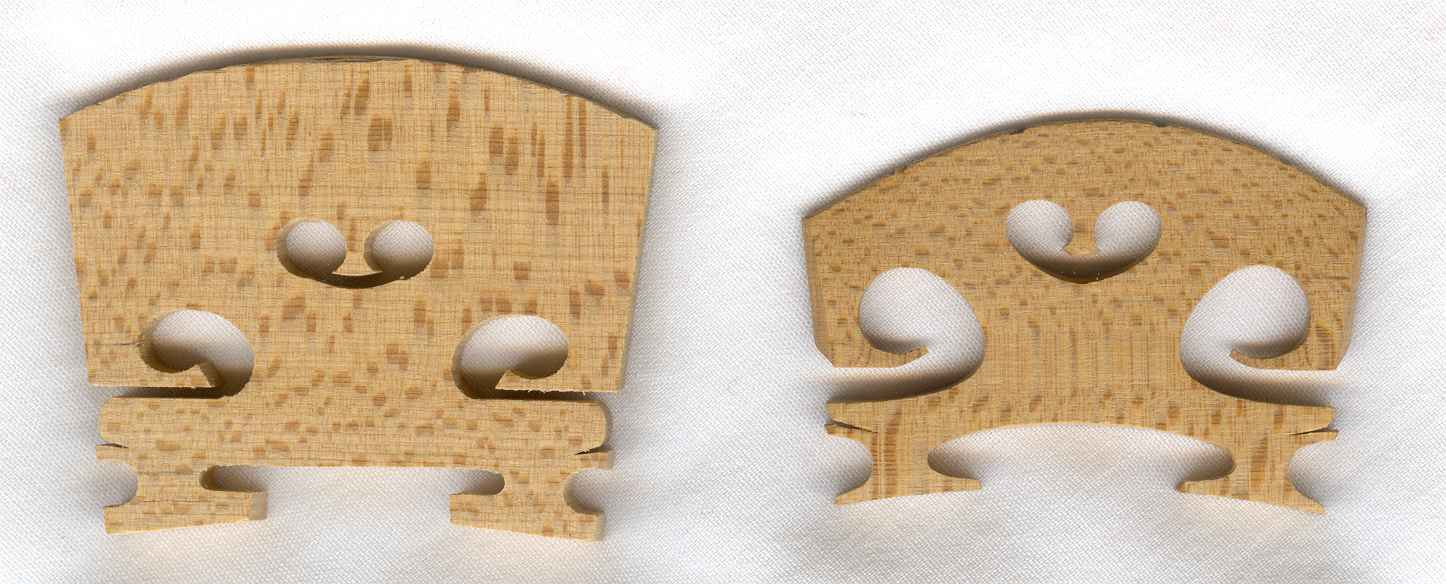
A violin bridge blank and a finished bridge.

Bridges may consist of a single piece of material, most commonly wood for violins and acoustic guitars, that fits between the strings and the resonant surface. Alternatively, a bridge may consist of multiple parts. One common form is a bridge with a separate bearing surface, called a saddle, that supports the strings. This is often of a material harder than the bridge itself, such as bone, ivory, high-density plastic, or metal. Some acoustic guitar bridges have multiple materials, such as a bridge support and "feet" made of wood and a plastic or bone "ridge" where the strings are positioned against.

A classical guitar saddle sits loosely in the hardwood bridge, held in place by string tension. Strings pass through shallow grooves in the saddle, at least for the treble strings, which prevents them moving around during hard playing.

Yet another type of multi-part bridge is common on instruments with a curved sound plate, such as an arch-top guitar or mandolin. Such instruments often have a bridge with a base and separate saddle that can be adjusted for height. On classical and flat-top guitars the bridge is glued to the top. A bridge held on to the top by string tension, as in banjos and archtop jazz guitars, is called a floating bridge, and requires a separate tailpiece to anchor the strings. Electric guitars typically have a metal bridge, often with adjustable intonation screws.

== Bridge pin ==
Bridge pins or string pegs are used on some musical instruments to locate the string precisely in the horizontal plane, and in the case of harpsichords to affect the sustain of the strings. They are usually made of steel in modern pianos, of brass in harpsichords, and bone or synthetics on acoustic guitars. Electric guitars do not usually have bridge pins as with acoustic guitars; they are used to transfer the sound from the strings into the hollow body of the instrument as well as holding the strings in place.

In pianos the pins are set precisely in line with the edges of the notches of the bridge. The precise and firm setting of the pins is a critical element of the piano's quality. Loose or inaccurate pinning commonly produces false beats and tonal irregularities.

In harpsichords there tends to be a significant distance instead. This enables control of sustain and tone in harpsichord design (as per external link).

== Tie block ==
The bridge of the classical guitar does not use bridge pins. In this instrument the strings are tied to the part of the bridge called the tie block. Strings run over the bridge saddle, through drilled holes in the base of the tie block, loop over the top of the tie block, loop under the strings and are tied on. A variation called the 18 hole bridge uses three holes per string and eliminates the need to tie the string down.

== Operation ==
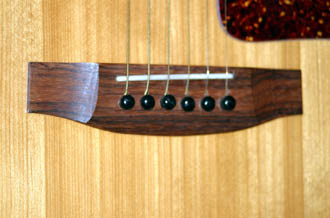
A guitar's bridge holds its strings fast to the instrument; its saddle (white) raises them above the bridge and conveys their vibrations to the bridge. The black fasteners are called string pegs. The black fasteners are "loose"—held in place only by string tension.

The bridge must transfer vibration of the strings to the sound board or other amplifying surface. As the strings are set in motion (whether by picking or strumming, as with guitars, by bowing, with violin family instruments, or by striking them, as with pianos), the bridge bends to and fro along the string direction at twice the rate of the string vibration. This causes the sounding board to vibrate at the same frequency as the string producing a wave-like motion and an audible sound. Instruments typically use a hollow, resonant chamber (violin bodies, guitar bodies) or a pickup and an amplifier/speaker to make this sound loud enough for the performers and audience to hear.

Bridges are designed to hold the strings at a suitable height above the fingerboard of the instrument. The ideal bridge height creates sufficient angularity in the string to create enough down force to drive the top, but places the strings sufficiently close to the fingerboard to make noting the strings easy. Bridge height may be fixed or alterable. Most violin-family bridges are carved by a luthier; as such, the height can be changed, but only by taking the violin into the repair shop. Many acoustic guitars have fixed bridges that a regular player cannot adjust. Some archtop jazz guitars have a "floating bridge" similar to violin family instruments.

In addition to supporting the strings and transmitting their vibrations, the bridge also controls the spacing between strings with shallow grooves cut in the bridge or its saddle. The strings sit in those grooves, thus are held in their proper lateral position. The nut, at the opposite end of the instrument from the bridge or tailpiece (typically where the head holding the tuning pegs joins the fingerboard), serves a similar string-spacing function. As well, like the bridge, the nut's height determines how high the strings are from the fingerboard.

== Electric guitar bridges ==
Bridges for electric guitars can be divided into two main groups, "vibrato" and "non-vibrato" (also called "hard-tail"). Vibrato bridges have an arm or lever (called the vibrato arm, tremolo arm, or "whammy bar") that extends from below the string anchoring point. It acts as a lever that the player can push or pull to change the strings' tension and, as a result, "bend" the pitch down or up. This means that this type of bridge produces vibrato (a pitch change) rather than actual tremolo, but the term "tremolo" is deeply entrenched in popular usage via some manufacturers (starting with Fender Stratocaster in 1954) naming their vibrato systems as "tremolo".

Non-vibrato bridges supply an anchoring point for the strings but provide no active control over string tension or pitch. That is, there is no "whammy bar" or lever. A small group of vibrato bridges have an extended tail (also called "longtail"). These guitars have more reverb and sustain in their sound, because of the string resonance behind the bridge. The Fender Jaguar is an example of such a guitar.

All bridges have advantages, and disadvantages, depending on the playing style, but, in general, a non-vibrato bridge is thought to provide better tuning stability and a solid contact between the guitar body and the strings. A whammy bar bridge is important in some heavy metal music styles, such as shred guitar.

=== Vibrato bridges ===
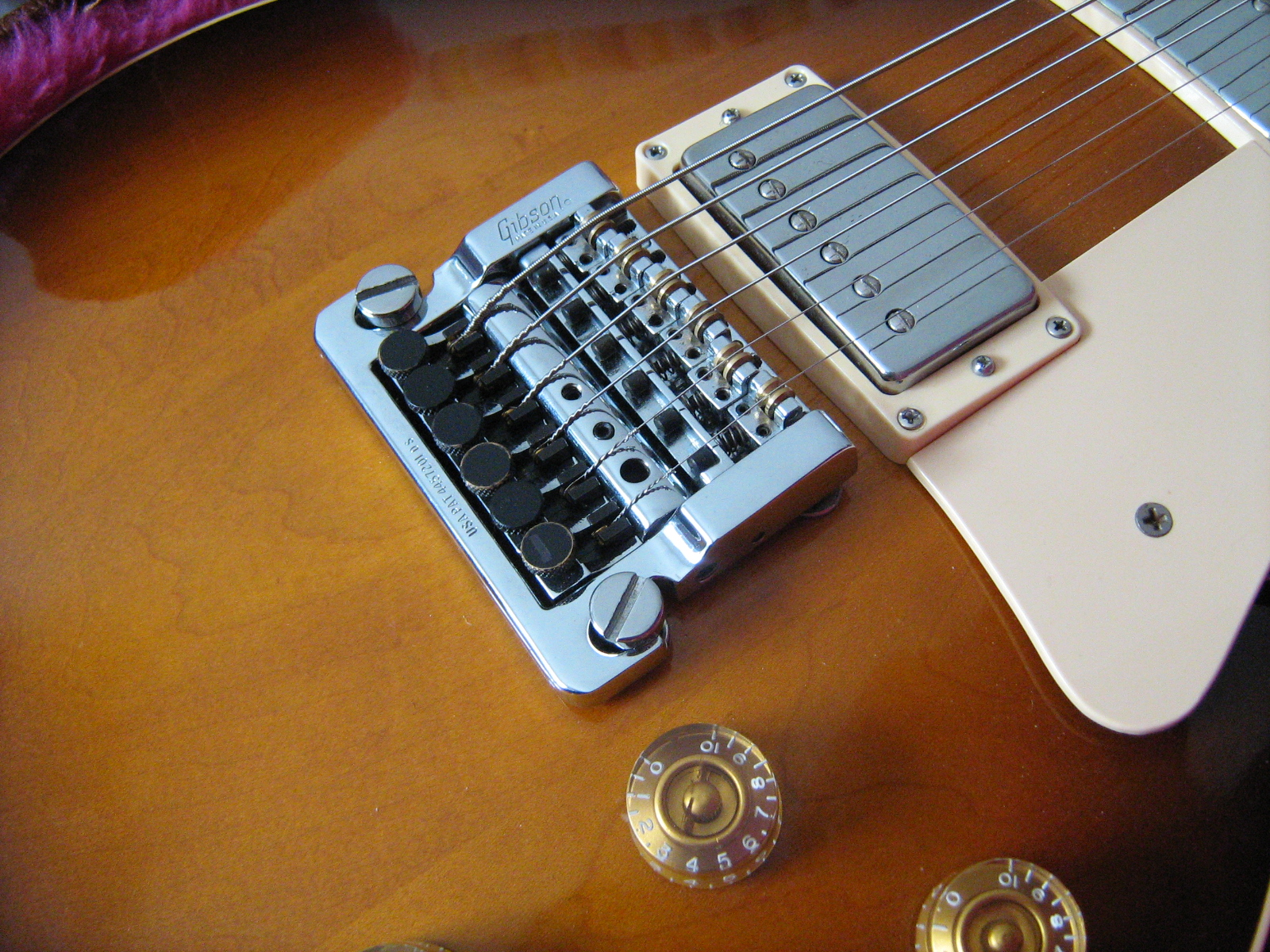
A licensed Kahler vibrato system on an '87 Gibson Les Paul Standard. Note that the "whammy bar" lever is not attached in this photo.

Generally, the more contact the bridge has with the body (i.e., the lower the position), the better the sound transfer is into the body. A "warmer" sound with increased sustain is the result. Vibrato bridges usually must be suspended in some way, which reduces contact. Most vibrato system designs use a group of springs in the guitar body, which oppose the tension of the strings. Some players feel that the vibration of the springs affects resonance in a way that makes the guitar sound better, but others disagree. Many electric guitar playing styles require a vibrato system, either "locking" or "non-locking".

==== Non-locking tremolo/vibrato systems ====
Non-locking (or vintage) tremolos are the bridges found on guitars manufactured prior to the advent of the Floyd Rose locking tremolo in the late 1970s and many (typically cheaper) guitars manufactured thereafter. For many playing styles, vintage tremolos are a good choice because they are easy to use and maintain and have very few parts. Some people feel that they can also provide a better degree of sound transfer, especially with tailpiece type tremolos such as the Bigsby lever used on vintage instruments. However, the "Synchronized Tremolo" type found on the Fender Stratocaster is balanced against a set of screws in much the same manner as a locking tremolo. Given that this type of tremolo is installed on solid body guitars the degree to which sound transfer affects the sound that the instrument produces is minimal.

Also, keeping a guitar with a non-locking tremolo in tune can be difficult. The most common types of non-locking tremolos are the "Synchronized Tremolo" type and an almost endless stream of copies. The Bigsby vibrato tailpiece is another option.

==== Locking tremolo/vibrato systems ====
A locking tremolo uses a bridge that has a small clamp in each saddle to hold the strings in place (usually adjusted with an Allen key). The nut at the end fingerboard also clamps the strings to hold them in place. This arrangement is especially useful for playing that requires tapping or heavy "bending" playing styles, such as shred guitar "dive bombing" effects. Locking tremolos provide excellent stability, but their fulcrum points provide minute contact with the body, which might disturb sound transfer.

=== Non-Tremolo/vibrato bridges ===
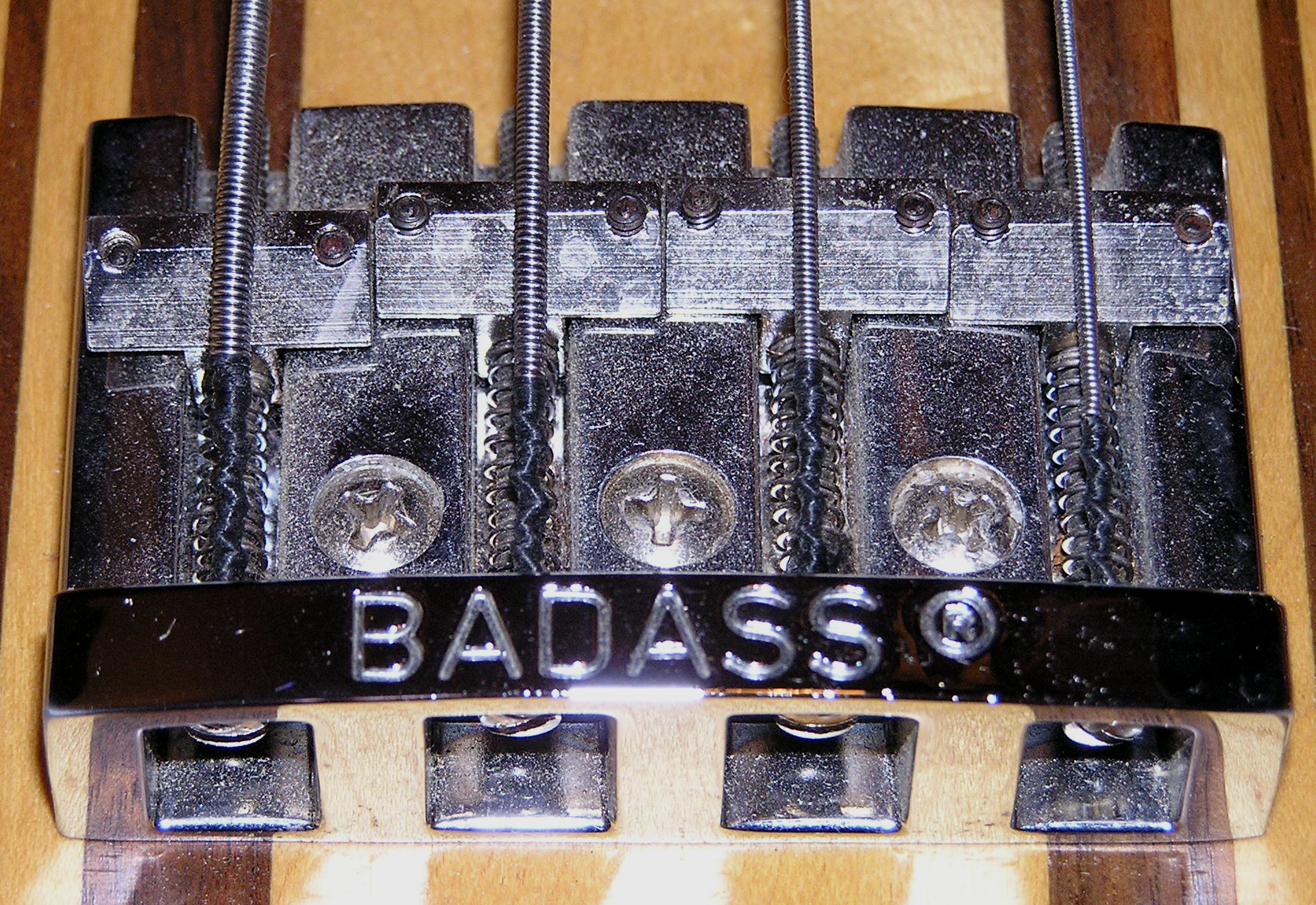
Badass Bridge on a Martin EB18 Bass guitar C.F. Martin & Company

It is generally thought that non-tremolo bridges offer better transfer of string vibration into the body. This is due to direct contact of the bridge to the guitar's body. These bridges bolt directly to the guitar body. Assuming the bridge is of good quality, it limits longitudinal string movement, providing tuning stability. The improved transfer of string vibration into the body has an effect on the sound, so guitars with this type of bridge have different characteristics than those with tremolos, even when removed. There are no springs in the body or a cavity to accommodate them, which also affects resonance.

== See also ==
- Fingerboard
- Electronic tuner Some tuners attach to the bridge of an instrument.
- Nut (string instrument)
