= Fingerboard =

String instrument part

Fretted classical guitar fingerboard

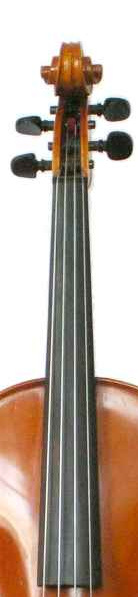
Fretless violin fingerboard

The fingerboard (also known as a fretboard on fretted instruments) is an important component of most stringed instruments. It is a thin, long strip of material, usually wood, that is laminated to the front of the neck of an instrument. The strings run over the fingerboard, between the nut and bridge. In playing the instrument, a musician presses strings down to the fingerboard to change the vibrating length, changing the pitch. This is called stopping the strings. Depending on the instrument and the style of music, the musician may pluck, strum or bow one or more strings with the hand that is not fretting the notes. On some instruments, notes can be sounded by the fretting hand alone, such as with hammer ons, an electric guitar technique.

The word "fingerboard" in other languages sometimes occurs in musical directions—in particular, the direction sul tasto (Ital., also sulla tastiera, Fr. sur la touche, G. am Griffbrett) for bowed string instruments to be played with the bow above the fingerboard. This reduces the prominence of upper harmonics, giving a more ethereal tone.

== Frets ==
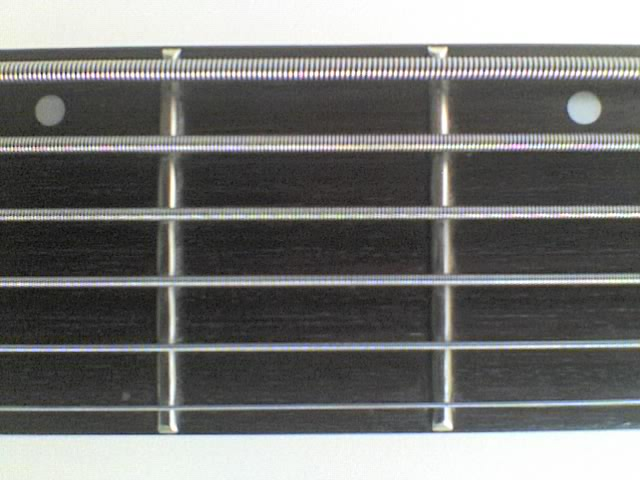
Six strings bass guitar fingerboard

A fingerboard may be fretted, having raised strips of hard material perpendicular to the strings, which the player presses the strings against to stop the strings. On modern guitars, frets are typically made of metal. Frets let the player stop the string consistently in the same place, which enables the musician to play notes with the correct intonation. As well, frets do not dampen string vibrations as much as fingers alone on an unfretted fingerboard. Frets may be fixed, as on a guitar or mandolin, or movable, as on a lute. Fingerboards may also be unfretted, as they usually are on bowed instruments, where damping by the finger is of little consequence because of the sustained stimulation of the strings by the bow. Unfretted fingerboards allow a musician more control over subtle changes in pitch than fretted boards, but are generally considered harder to master. Fingerboards may also be, though uncommon, a hybrid of these two. Such a construction is seen on the sitar, where arched frets attach at the edges of a smooth fingerboard; unfrettable strings run inside the frets, while frettable ones run outside. The fret arches are sufficiently high that the exterior strings can be fretted without the finger making contact with the interior strings.

Frets may be marked by inlays to make navigating the fingerboard easier. On six-string guitars and bass guitars, markers are typically single smallish dots on the fingerboard and on its side that indicate the 3rd, 5th, 7th and 9th frets—and the octaves of those positions higher up the neck. A double dot or some other variation marks the 12th fret and 24th frets. Variations on the standard dot shape can make a guitar more distinctive. Position markers are sometimes made luminescent (through using paint, or illuminated with light emitting diodes) to make them more visible on stage. Position markers are also sometimes repeated on the edge of the fingerboard for easy viewing.

Over time, strings wear frets down, which can cause buzzing and deaden the sound. Fixing this occasionally requires replacing the frets—but more often they just need "dressing". In fret dressing, a luthier levels and polishes the frets, and crowns (carefully rounds and shapes) the ends and edges. Stainless steel guitar frets may never need dressing, because of the density of the material. Not having frets carefully and properly aligned with the fingerboard can cause severe intonation issues and constant detuning. The ultimate way of determining the source of a buzz and detuning problem is to measure the levelness of the frets. A straightedge positioned on the neck in the "lie" of one of the strings should show nearly level frets. (There should be a slight relief to compensate for the elliptical shape of the vibrating strings.)

Guitar players and techs use the term "fret sprout" to describe when the ends of frets poke out past the sides of the fingerboard, "sprouting" like a plant out of the ground. The exposed metal, often sharp, makes playing uncomfortable or painful.

== Materials ==
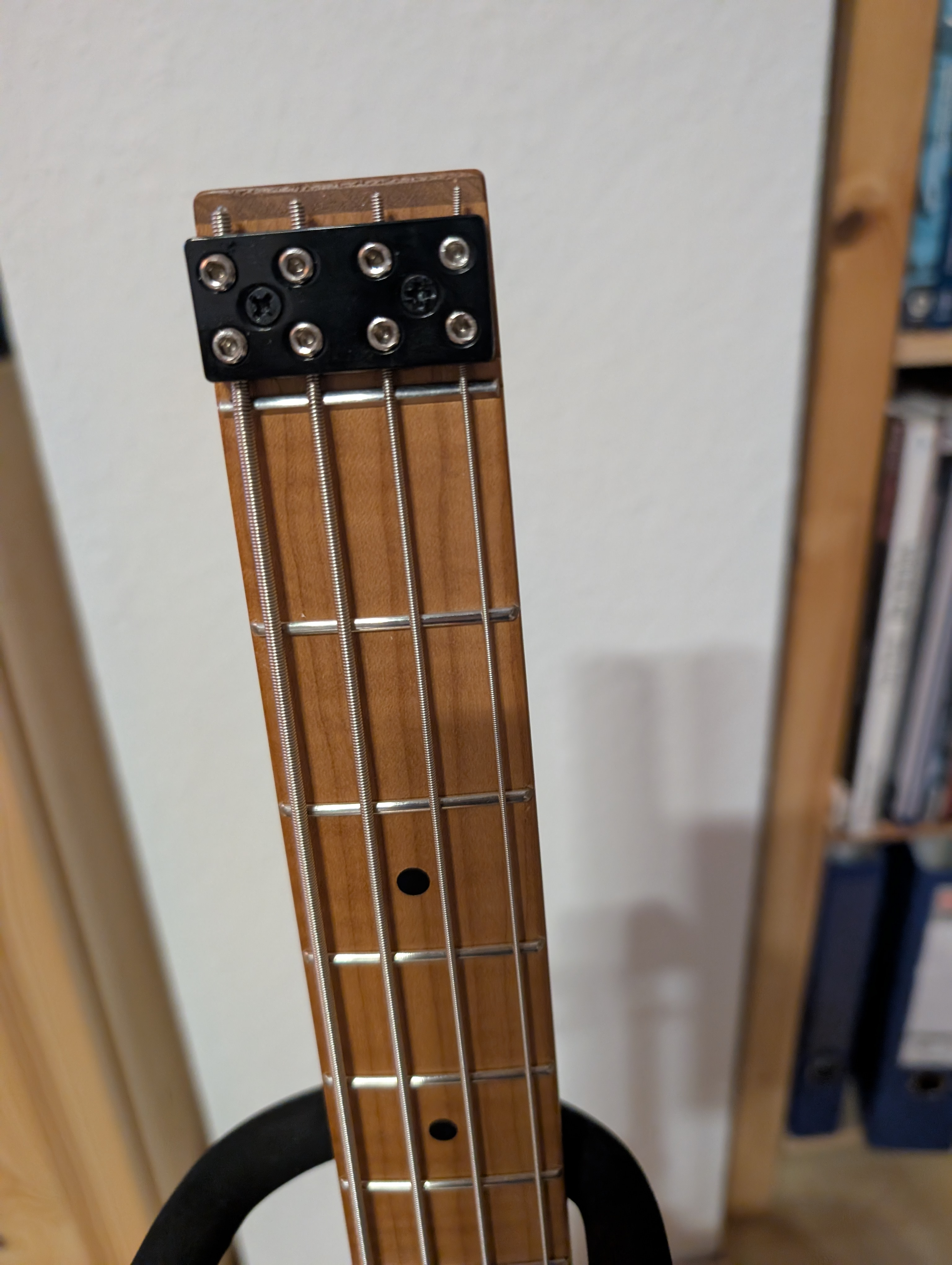
Fingerboard made from roasted maple on a Kolibri Guitars bass guitar

On bowed string instruments, (such as violin, viola, cello, and double bass), the fingerboard is usually made of ebony, rosewood or other hardwood. On some guitars, a maple neck and fingerboard are made from one piece of wood.

A few modern luthiers have used lightweight, non-wood materials such as carbon-fiber, Micarta and Richlite in their fingerboards. Various impregnated wood materials are being used for fingerboards in fretted instruments.

== Parameters ==
Fingerboard profile looking from nut to bridge. Scheme and essential parameters

Typically, the fingerboard is a long plank with a rectangular profile. On a guitar, mandolin, ukulele, or similar plucked instrument, the fingerboard appears flat and wide but may be slightly curved to form a cylindrical or conical surface of relatively large radius compared to the fingerboard width. The radius quoted in the specification of a string instrument is the radius of curvature of the fingerboard at the head nut.

Most bowed string instruments use a visibly curved fingerboard, nut and bridge to provide bow clearance for each individual string.

The length, width, thickness and density of a fingerboard can affect timbre. Most fingerboards can be fully described by these parameters:

- w_{1} — width at nut (close to the headstock)
- w_{2} — width at half of scale length (if fretted, usually the 12th fret)
- h_{1} — profile height (thickness) at the nut
- h_{2} — profile height (thickness) at half of scale length
- r — radius (may be non-constant)

=== Radius ===
Graphs of r(x) function for typical fingerboard profiles

Depending on values of radius r and their transition over the length of the fingerboard, all fingerboards usually fit into one of the following four categories:

1	Flat	Both nut and bridge are flat. The strings are all in one plane, and the instrument does not have a radius (the radius is in a sense infinite).	$r = \infty$
2	Cylindrical	The fingerboard has a constant radius, and the fingerboard, the nut and the bridge all have the same nominal radius (that of the fingerboard is strictly speaking a little smaller than that of nut and bridge).	$r = r_1 = r_2 = const$
3	Conical	The fingerboard has a varying radius, usually linearly progressing from $r_1$ to $r_2$. Sometimes it is also called a compound radius. The nut and bridge are both curved but the nut radius is smaller than that of the bridge.	$r(x) = r_1 + \frac{x}{l}(r_2 - r_1)$
4	Compound	While not strictly conical, with a curved nut and linear bridge. All parts of the fingerboard have some curvature, but the fingerboard shape is not strictly a cone.	$r(x) = f(x)$, usually $r(l) = \infty$

Notes:

- $l$ is a scale.
- $x$ designates a place on fingerboard, changes from 0 (at nut) to $l$ (at bridge).
- $r(x)$ describes radius depending on place on fingerboard.
- $f(x)$ is a non-linear function.

Classical guitars, some 12-string guitars, banjos, dobros, pedal steel, and a few steel-stringed acoustic guitars have flat fingerboards. Almost all other guitars have at least some curvature. However, some recent five and six string electric basses have flat fingerboards.

For guitars, some players feel that smaller radii (7.25–10") are more comfortable for chord and rhythm playing, while larger radii (12"-16" and up to flat) are better for fast soloing. Conical and compound radius fingerboards try to merge both these features. The nut end of the fingerboard has a smaller radius to ease in forming chords. The bridge end of the fingerboard has a larger radius to make soloing more comfortable and prevent "noting out" ("fretting out"), in which a string comes in contact with a higher fret during bends.

A Brief History Of Discovering The Conical Fingerboard in 1978 by luthier Denny Rauen can be found in American Lutherie #8/Winter 1986 and String Instrument Craftsman May/June 1988 under the title "Multi-Radius Fingerboards". This special radiusing is a standard on many of Denny's custom-built guitars and refret work beginning in 1978. Denny Rauen's articles on the "Multi Radius Fingerboard" are the first published documents on using a conical fingerboard to improve string bending while retaining comfortable chording.

Bowed string instruments usually have curved fingerboards, to allow the player to bow single strings. Those of the modern violin family and the double bass are strongly curved, however those of some archaic bowed instruments are flat.

=== Examples ===
Examples of some instruments' fingerboard radius parameters:

Model	radius
Fender vintage guitars	7.25 in (184.1 mm)
Fender modern guitars	9.5 in (241 mm)
Gibson electric guitars	12 in (305 mm)
Gibson acoustic guitars	12 in (305 mm)
Martin acoustic guitars	16 in (406.4 mm)
Danelectro guitars	14 in (355 mm)
Rickenbacker guitars	10 in (254mm)
Jackson guitars	16 in (406 mm) compound
PRS Guitars Regular	10 in (254 mm)
Classical guitars	flat (no radius)
Full size (4/4) violin	42 mm

== Scalloping ==
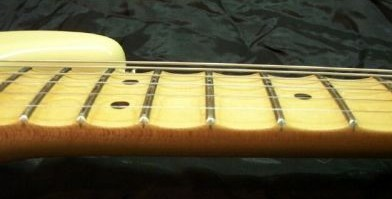
Scalloped fingerboard of Yngwie Malmsteen's Stratocaster

A fretted fingerboard can be scalloped by "scooping out" the wood between each of the frets to create a shallow "U" shape. The result is a playing surface wherein the players' fingers come into contact with the strings only, and do not touch the fingerboard.

If done by hand, the process of scalloping a fingerboard is tedious and time consuming work, involving the careful filing of wood between the frets, and can be expensive. Alternatively, luthiers can employ a special milling machine with 22 or 24 (according to neck length and number of frets) wood cutting tools. This equipment saves time and adds precision to the process, keeping the neck's radius the same in all fret spaces.

Scalloped fingerboards are most commonly used by shred guitarists, most notably Ritchie Blackmore and Yngwie Malmsteen, who have signature models developed with Fender that include scalloped fingerboards. Ibanez JEM series guitars, designed and played by Steve Vai, come standard with the last 4 frets scalloped. In 2008 Ibanez made available their E-Gen model, a Herman Li signature, which includes four scalloped frets (21st to 24th). Karl Sanders of the death metal band Nile also uses several guitars with scalloped fingerboards, including several Deans, and KxK Guitars.

In the 1970s, English guitarist John McLaughlin played with Shakti, along with Indian violinist L. Shankar, using an acoustic guitar with a fully scalloped fretboard. He also used an electric guitar with a scalloped fretboard in studio and live performances from 1978 to 1979. McLaughlin explained that this feature increased the ease and range of string bends by eliminating friction between the finger and fretboard. The scalloped fretboard also facilitates the rapid, microtonal variation that is important in Indian music, as exemplified by classical Indian Sitar music. Without scallops, the guitarist must play microtones by sliding the string sideways on the fret.

Experimental luthier Yuri Landman made an electric guitar for John Schmersal of Enon called the Twister with a partial scalloped neck for only the thin strings (similar to small playground slides).

Some examples of lutes with scalloped fretboards include the South Indian veena and Vietnamized guitar (called đàn ghi-ta, lục huyền cầm, or ghi-ta phím lõm). The Japanese multi-instrumentalist and experimental musical instrument builder Yuichi Onoue has also made a deeply scalloped electric guitar for Vietnamese microtonal playing techniques.

Some types of scalloping are:

- Partial Scalloping, with some of the high frets scalloped for fast soloing. Popular examples include half scalloping (12th to the last fret, used by Kiko Loureiro of Megadeth, among others) or upper fret scalloping (19–24, 17–22, etc.), used by such guitarists as Steve Vai. When done by hand, sometimes fretboards can be scalloped half below the D or G strings, as in the case for Turkish luthier Kenan Turgut.
- Full Scalloping, i.e., all frets from the first to the last are scalloped
- Extreme Scalloping scalloping has lateral intrusions in addition to the standard vertical hollows. The additional versatility in note control comes at the cost of substantially reduced rigidity of the neck.

Note that filing away wood to scallop a fingerboard also affects inlays—so intricately inlaid fingerboards are not usually good candidates for scalloping. Simple dot or block inlays survive the procedure moderately well.

=== Advantages and disadvantages ===
The "scooped out" nature of scalloped fingerboards creates a number of changes in the way the guitar plays. Most obvious is that the fingertip only contacts the string, not the fingerboard itself, creating less friction for bends and vibratos, which results in more overall control while playing. It also results in more weight-relief and less "neck-dive".

However, one of the main disadvantages is that many players, especially new players, may find a scalloped fingerboard too different, and difficult to play easily, especially if the strings are of a lighter gauge or the player tends to press too hard. It takes practice to play in tune on a scalloped fingerboard. The player must first become accustomed to not actually touching the fingerboard. Playing a scalloped fingerboard requires a careful application of pressure: Too much pressure raises the pitch of the fretted note to a sharp note, as during a bend, and too little pressure causes fret buzz. As a result, most guitar players use a traditional fingerboard on their instruments.

== Scoop of fretless bowed-string fingerboards ==
Fretless bowed-string fingerboards are usually scooped lengthwise in a smooth curve, so that if a straight edge is held next to the board parallel to a string, some daylight shows between them, towards the centre of the board. Usually the scoop is slightly greater on the bass side, less on the treble side of the fingerboard. Different string materials or different styles of playing may call for differing amounts of scoop. Nylon or gut strings require the most, and solid steel-core strings the least. A typical full-size (4/4) violin with synthetic-core G, D, and A strings shows 0.75 mm of scoop under the G string, and between 0.5 mm and zero scoop under the E, which is usually a solid steel core on modern instruments.

== Dip of guitar fretboards ==
On guitars, specifically steel-string and electric guitars, the relief (or "dip") is adjustable by altering the tension on the steel truss rod inside the neck. Relaxing the truss rod allows the pull of the strings to increase the dip, and vice versa. Classical guitars do not need truss rods due to the lower tension of nylon strings but should still exhibit some degree of dip.

== See also ==
- Scale length (string instruments)
- Bridge (instrument)
