= String (music) =

Sound producing musical instrument component

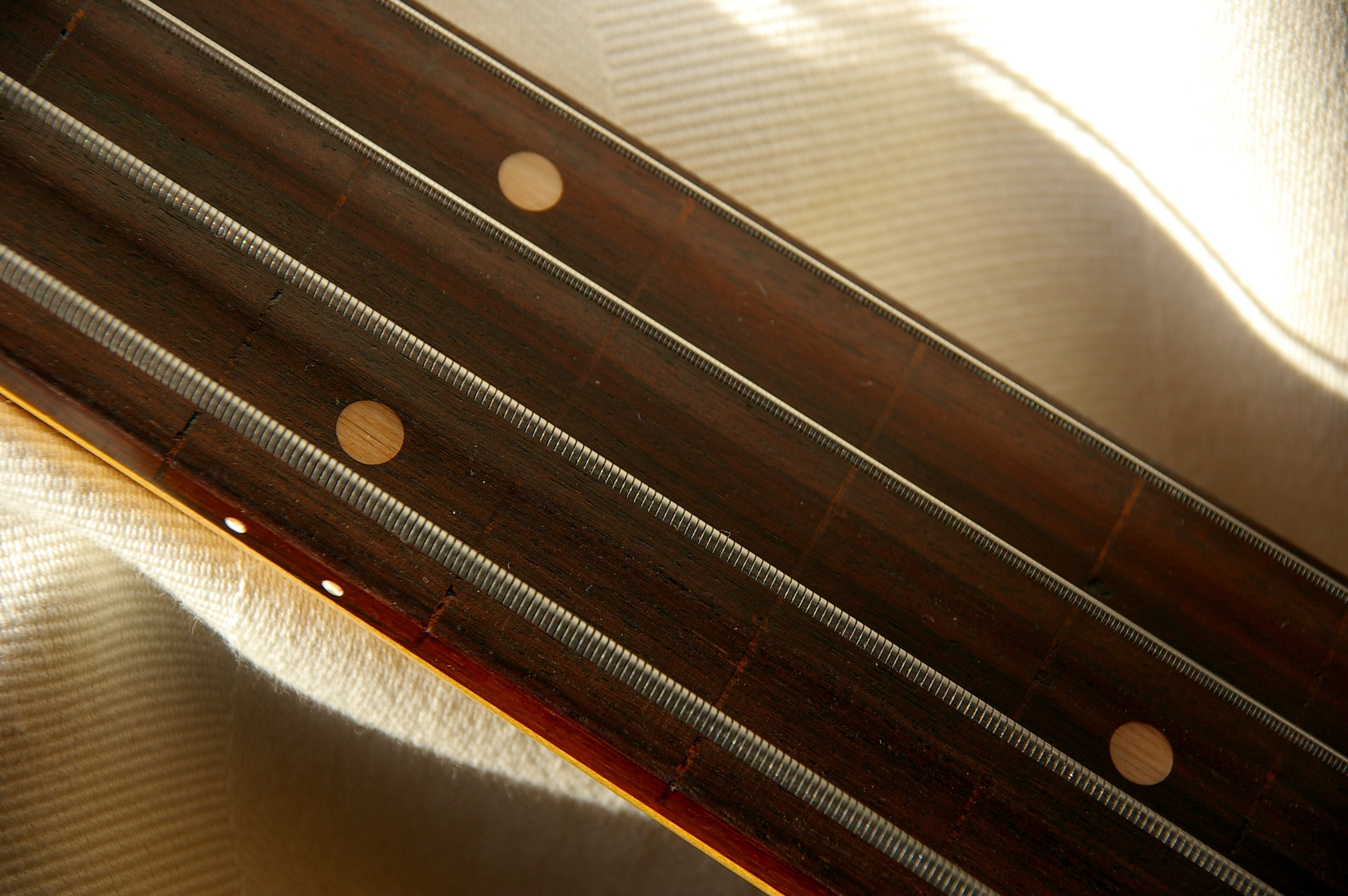
Flatwound strings on a fretless bass guitar.

In music, strings are long flexible structures on string instruments that produce sound through vibration. Strings are held under tension so that they can vibrate freely. The pitch (frequency) at which a string will vibrate is primarily related to its vibrating length (also called speaking length), its tension, and its mass per unit of length. A vibrating string produces very little sound by itself. Therefore, most string instruments have a soundboard to amplify the sound.

There are two main kinds of strings; plain and wound. "Plain" strings are one piece of long cylindrical material, commonly consisted of nylon, gut, or steel. "Wound" strings have a central core, with other material being tightly wound around the string .

Prior to Second World War, strings of many instruments (including violins, lutes, and guitars) were made of catgut, a type of cord made from refined natural fibers of animal intestines. During the mid-twentieth century, steel and nylon strings became more favored in string making, although catgut is still prized for its unique sound. The invention of wound strings was a crucial step in string instrument technology, because a metal-wound string can produce a lower pitch than a plain gut string of similar thickness. This enabled stringed instruments to be made with thinner bass strings.

On string instruments that the player plucks or bows directly (e.g., double bass), this enabled instrument makers to use thinner strings for the lowest-pitched strings, which made the lower-pitch strings easier to play. On stringed instruments in which the player presses a keyboard, causing a mechanism to strike the strings, such as a piano, this enabled piano builders to use shorter, thicker strings to produce the lowest-pitched bass notes, enabling the building of smaller upright pianos designed for small rooms and practice rooms.

== String construction ==
The end of the string that mounts to the instrument's tuning mechanism (the part of the instrument that turns to tighten or loosen string tension) is usually plain. Depending on the instrument, the string's other, fixed end may have either a plain, loop, or ball end (a short brass cylinder) that attaches the string at the end opposite the tuning mechanism. When a ball or loop is used with a guitar, this ensures that the string stays fixed in the bridge of the guitar. When a ball or loop is used with a violin-family instrument, this keeps the string end fixed in the tailpiece. Fender Bullet strings have a larger cylinder for more stable tuning on guitars equipped with synchronized tremolo systems. Strings for some instruments may be wrapped with silk at the ends to protect the string. The color and pattern of the silk often identify attributes of the string, such as manufacturer, size, intended pitch, etc.

=== Winding types ===
==== Roundwound ====
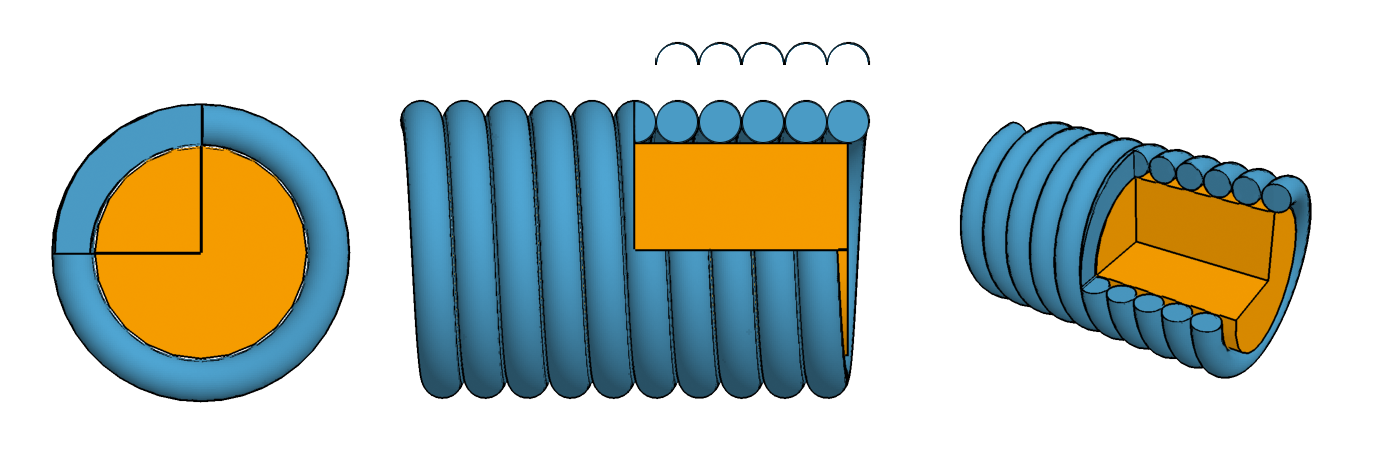

Roundwound strings are the simplest and most basic wound strings, they have round wire wrapped in a tight spiral around either a round or hexagonal core. Such strings are usually simple to manufacture, are the least expensive, and are convenient. Despite these advantages, they have several drawbacks, however:

- Roundwound strings have a bumpy surface profile (the bumps of the winding) that produce friction on the player's fingertips. This causes squeaking sounds when the player's fingers slide over the strings, especially when used on electric guitar with a guitar amplifier or with an acoustic guitar amplified through a PA system. (Some artists use this sound creatively, such as hardcore punk and heavy metal music electric guitarists who scrape the pick down the lower-pitched strings for an effect.)
- Roundwound strings' higher friction surface profile may hasten fingerboard and fret wear, compared with smoother flatwound strings.
- When the core is round, the winding is less secure and may rotate freely around the core, especially if the winding is damaged after use.

==== Flatwound ====
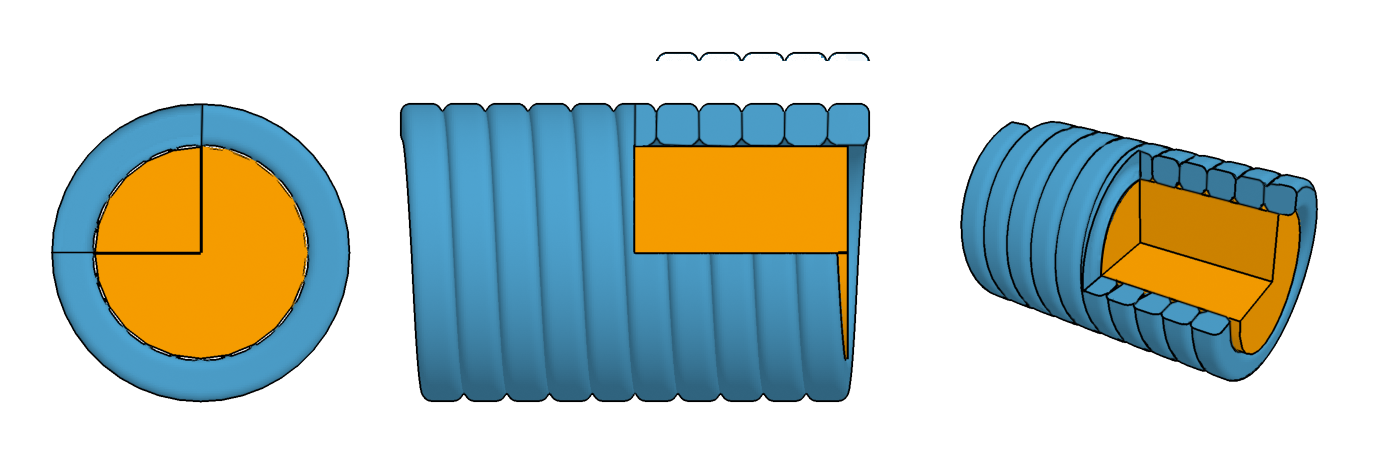

Flatwound strings are strings that have either a round or hex core, and have winding wire that has a rounded square cross-section that has a shallower profile (in cross-section) when tightly wound. This makes for more comfortable playing, and decreased wear for frets and fretboards (this makes them a popular choice for fretless instruments). Squeaking sounds due to fingers sliding along the strings are also decreased significantly. Flatwound strings also have a longer playable life because of smaller grooves for dirt and oil to build up in.

On the other hand, flatwound strings sound less bright than roundwounds and tend to be harder to bend, thus produce vibrato. Flatwounds also are more expensive than roundwounds because of less demand, less production, and higher overhead costs. Manufacturing is also more difficult, as precise alignment of the flat sides of the winding must be maintained (some rotation of the winding on roundwound strings is acceptable).

Modern bowed strings are plain (typically the higher-pitched, thinner strings) or flatwound, to allow smooth playing and reduce bow hair breakage. There is a niche market for roundwound fiddle strings.

==== Halfround, halfwound, ground wound, pressure wound ====
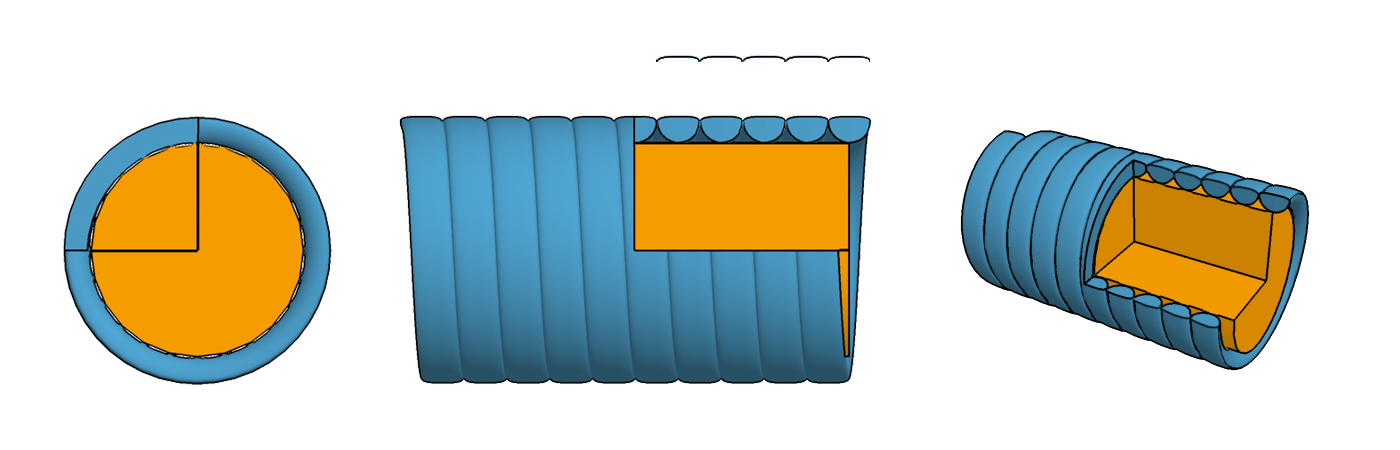

Halfround (also referred to as halfwound, ground wound, or pressure wound strings) are string that are cross between roundwound and flatwound. Such strings are usually made by winding round wire around a round or hex core first, then polishing, grinding (thus the name, ground wound) or pressing the exterior part of the winding until it is practically flat. This results in the flat, comfortable playing feel of flatwounds, along with less squeaking, with a brightness generally between roundwounds and flatwounds. The polishing process removes almost half of the winding wire's mass; thus, to compensate for it, manufacturers use winding wire of a heavier gauge. Because of the extra manufacturing process involved, they are normally more expensive than roundwounds, but less than flatwounds.

==== Hex wound ====
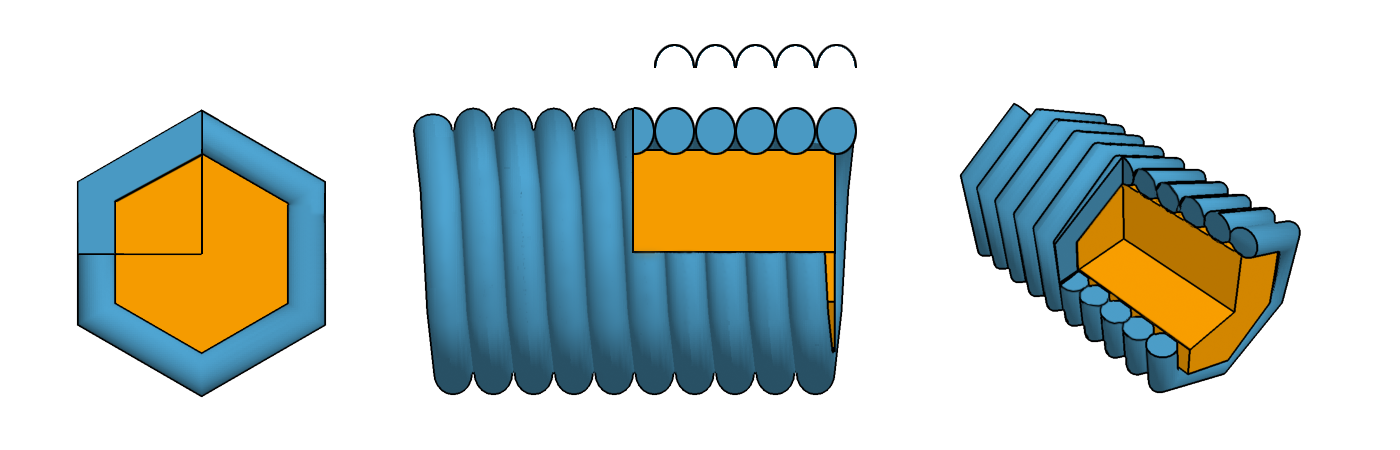

Hex wound strings are basically hexagon shaped versions of round wound strings in which they have a hex core with a round winding that is wrapped in the shape of a hexagon. This winding process solves the second problem: it secures the winding around the core so it cannot rotate and slip under the fingers, and it improves tone due to closer bond between the core and the winding. The drawback that hex wound strings used to have was that hexagonal corners are less comfortable for fingers, and wear down the fingerboard and fret wire even faster than regular round wound strings; that drawback has been addressed by having the corners slightly rounded to make them more comfortable on the fingers and to protect the fingerboard and frets from scratches.

=== Core types ===
There are two types, or shapes, of core wire typically used in wound strings.

==== Hexcore ====
Hexcore strings are composed of hexagonal core wire and a tight (usually round) winding. Hexcore string design prevents the winding from slipping around the core – which can occur with round core strings. This may improve tuning stability, flexibility, and reduce string breakage, compared to round core strings.

==== Round core ====
Round core strings are composed of regular round core and a tight (usually round) winding. Round core is the traditional "vintage" way of manufacturing and results in a greater contact between the winding and the core of the string.

== Gauge ==
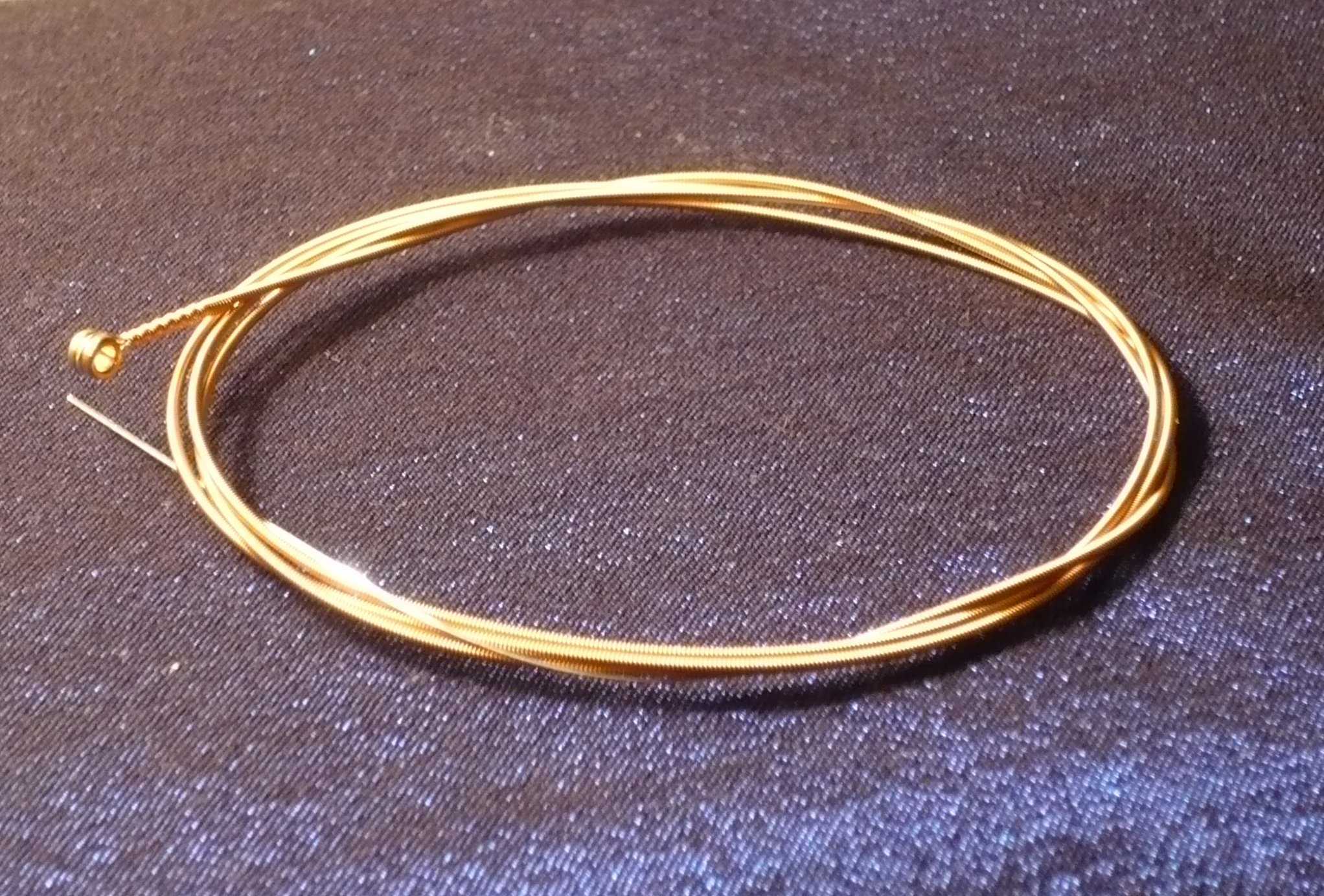
A wound acoustic guitar string (phosphor bronze wound around steel) with a ball end, 0.044" gauge

Bowed instrument strings, such as for the violin or cello, are usually described by tension rather than gauge. Fretted instruments (guitar, banjo, etc.) strings are usually described by gauge—the diameter of the string. The tone of a string depends partly on weight, and, therefore, on its diameter—its gauge. Usually, string manufacturers that do not describe strings by tension list string diameter in thousandths of an inch (0.001 in = 0.0254 mm). The larger the diameter, the heavier the string. Heavier strings require more tension for the same pitch and are, as a consequence, harder to press down to the fingerboard. A fretted instrument that is restrung with different string gauges may require adjustment to the string height above the frets (the "action") to maintain playing ease or keep the strings from buzzing against the frets. The action height of fretless instruments is also adjusted to suit the string gauge or material, as well as the intended playing style.

=== Guitar ===
Steel strings for six-string guitar usually come in sets of matched strings. Sets are usually referenced either by the gauge of the first string (e.g., 9), or by pair of first and last (e.g., 9–42); measurements in thousands of an inch are the de facto standard, regardless of whether Imperial units are used in a country. Some manufacturers may have slightly different gauge sequences; the sample data below comes from D'Addario string charts for regular, round-wound, nickel-plated strings. String set design has historically been done on a trial and error basis. Modern software tools can aid in the process.

==== Electric guitar ====
The highest string on a six string electric guitars is usually 8 to 12 thousandths inches in diameter. The low e is typically a 42 to 55 string. While thinner strings are easier to play, they fall out of tune faster and produce a less rich sound than thicker ones.

==== Acoustic guitar ====
String gauge is subject to the personal preferences of the musician, but acoustic guitars are typically strung with a heavier gauge than electric guitars. The need for projection due to lack of amplification is one of the main reasons for this.

==== Bass guitar ====
Bass guitar strings are sometimes made for a particular scale length and come in short, medium, long and extra long (sometimes called super long) scale. Almost all bass guitar strings are made wound.

== Bowed strings ==
Since the 20th century, with the advent of steel and synthetic core strings, most bowed instrument string makers market their strings by tension rather than by diameter. They typically make string sets in three tension levels: heavy, medium, and light (German stark, mittel, and weich). These tension levels are not standardized between manufacturers, and do not correlate to specific diameters. One brand's medium strings may have quite a different tension from another brand's medium. Based on available historical records, gut strings were sold before 1900 in a similar way.

On the other hand, modern gut core strings with metal winding, typically have been sold either ungauged for less expensive brands, or by specific gauge. The Gustav Pirazzi company in Germany introduced the Pirazzi meter (PM) measurement early in the 20th century. One PM equals .05 mm. For example, a 14 1/2 PM gauge string has is .725 mm in diameter. Pirazzi (now known as Pirastro) continues to sell its Oliv, Eudoxa, and Passione brand premium gut core strings by PM gauge. Each string is available in 5 or more discrete gauges. Manufacturers of traditional plain gut strings, often used in historically informed performance, sell their products by light/medium/heavy, by PM, by mm or some combination.

== Core materials ==
Steel forms the core of most metal strings. Certain keyboard instruments (e.g., harpsichord) and the Gaelic harp use brass. Other natural materials, such as silk or gut—or synthetics such as nylon and kevlar are also used for string cores. (Steel used for strings, called music wire, is hardened and tempered.) Some violin E strings are gold-plated to improve tone quality.

=== Steel ===
Steel or metal strings have become the foundation of strings for the electric guitar and bass. They have a pleasingly bright tone when compared to nylon strung guitars. Their metal composition varies greatly, sometimes using many different alloys as plating. Much of the history of metal strings evolved through innovations with the piano (see piano wire). In fact, the first wound metal strings ever used were used in a piano. However, when it came to getting extremely small diameter strings with good elastic properties, the electric guitar took the metal string to the next level adapting it for the use of pickups.

Because of the higher tension of steel strings, steel-strung guitars are more robustly made than 'classical' guitars, which use synthetic strings. Most jazz and folk string players prefer steel-core strings for their faster response, low cost, and tuning stability.

=== Nylon ===
Nylon (typically 610 or 612) string, traditionally used for classical music, has a more mellow tone, and the responsiveness of it can be enjoyed typically for folk but other styles of music use it as well (for example, Willie Nelson performs on a nylon strung guitar). Nylon is a softer, less dense material and nylon strings are used with about 50% less tension than steel strings. This means they can be used on older guitars that can't support the tension of modern steel strings.

Nylon strings do not work with magnetic pickups, which require ferrous strings that can interact with the magnetic field of the pickups to produce a signal.

Currently, stranded nylon is one of the most popular materials for the cores of violin, viola, cello, and double bass strings. It is often sold under the trade name of Perlon. Nylon guitar strings were first developed by Albert Augustine Strings in 1947.

=== Gut ===
The intestine, or gut, of sheep, cattle, and other animals (sometimes called catgut, though cats were never used as a source for this material) is one of the first materials used to make musical strings. In fact, the Ancient Greek word for string, "khordḗ," has "gut" as its original meaning.

Animal intestines are composed largely of elastomers, making them very flexible. But they are also extremely hygroscopic, which makes them susceptible to pitch fluctuation as a result of changing humidity. Exposure to moisture from the sweat of a musician's hands can cause plain (unwound) gut strings to fray and eventually break. This is not as much of a problem with wound gut strings, in which the gut core, being protected from contact with perspiration by the metal winding (and underlayer, if there is one), lasts a much longer time. All gut strings are vulnerable to going out of tune due to changes in atmospheric humidity and as a gut string ages and responds to cyclic changes in temperature and humidity the core becomes weak and brittle and eventually breaks.

However, despite the introduction of metal and synthetic core materials, many musicians still prefer to use gut strings, believing that they provide a superior tone. Players associated with the period performance movement use wound and unwound gut strings as part of an effort to recreate the sound of music of the Classical, Baroque, and Renaissance periods, as listeners would have heard it at the time of composition.

For players of plucked instruments, Nylgut strings are a recently developed alternative to gut strings. They are made from a specialty nylon and purport to offer the same acoustic properties as gut strings without the tuning problems.

=== Fluoropolymers (aka "Carbon") ===
Fluoropolymer strings are available for classical guitar, harp, and ukulele. This is the same material used for monofilament fishing lines, and a typical chemical used is PVDF. These strings are usually traded under descriptions like fluorocarbon, carbon fiber, or carbon, which is scientifically incorrect.

The so-called Carbon material has a higher density than nylon, so that a nylon string can be replaced by a carbon string of smaller diameter. This improves the precision of higher fretted notes, and the resulting vibrational behaviour leads to a more brilliant sound with improved harmonics. In particular, classical guitarists who feel that a nylon G string sounds too dull can use strings that include a carbon G string.

=== Other polymers ===
Other polymers, including polyetheretherketone and polybutylene terephthalate, have also been used.

=== Silk ===
Silk was extensively used in China for traditional Chinese musical instruments until replaced by metal and nylon strings in the 1950s. Only purely silk strings used for the guqin are still produced, while some silver-wound silk strings are still available for classical guitars and ukuleles. The quality in ancient times was high enough that one brand was praised as 'ice strings' for their smoothness and translucent appearance.

== Winding materials ==
Aluminum, silver, and chrome steel are common windings for bowed instruments like violin and viola, acoustic guitar strings are usually wound with bronze, and piano strings with copper. To resist corrosion from sweat, aluminium may be used as a resistant alloy such as hydronalium. Classical guitar strings are typically nylon. Electric guitar strings are usually wound with nickel-plated steel; pure nickel and stainless steel are also used. Bass guitar strings are most commonly wound with stainless steel or nickel. Copper, gold, silver, and tungsten are used for some instruments. Silver and gold are more expensive and are used for their resistance to corrosion and hypoallergenicity.

Some "historically-informed" strings use an open metal winding with a "barber pole" appearance. This practice improves the acoustic performance of heavier gauge gut strings by adding mass and making the string thinner for its tension. Specimens of such open wound strings are known from the early 18th century, in a collection of artifacts from Antonio Stradivari. "Silk and steel" guitar strings are overwound steel strings with silk filaments under the winding.

=== Phosphor bronze ===
Phosphor bronze was introduced by D'Addario in the early 1970s. Phosphor bronze is said to keep its "new" sound longer than other strings. Small amounts of phosphorus and zinc are added to the bronze mixture. This makes the phosphor bronze slightly more corrosion resistant than 80/20 bronze.

=== 80/20 bronze ===
80/20 bronze strings are 80 percent copper and 20 percent zinc. The zinc also gives it a brighter tone, additional hardness and slows down the aging process. With additional string coating, they are preserved even more. Although, If some of the coating is applied poorly, the strings can lose their tone in just a matter of hours, and if left in high humidity can turn a hint of green because of the copper and corrode with time. The name "80/20 bronze" is a misnomer since bronze is by definition an alloy of copper and tin. "80/20 bronze" strings would be more correctly referred to as brass.

=== Nickel-plated steel ===
Some acoustic players use strings, wound with nickel-plated-steel, meant for electric guitar. The properties of the nickel-plated strings make it a good choice for flattop guitars with sound hole-mounted magnetic pickups.

== String corrosion and prevention ==
An uncoated guitar string

A coated guitar string

All metal strings are susceptible to oxidation and corrosion. Wound strings commonly use metals such as brass or bronze in their winding. These two metals are very vulnerable to corrosion. The sebaceous gland in the player's skin produces oils that can be acidic. The oils, salts, and moisture from the player's fingers are the largest source of corrosion. The composition of the oil and the oxygen in the air also helps to oxidize and corrode the strings. In steel strings the oxygen reacts with the iron in the steel and it creates rust. As a result, the string loses its brilliance over time. Water, another by-product of oxidation, increases the potential for acid corrosion in oils. Wound strings, such as bronze acoustic strings, are very difficult to keep fresh sounding due to the lack of corrosion resistance. To help solve the corrosion problem strings are either metal plated or polymer coated. The polymer coating is claimed to reduce finger squeak and fret wear, and has better tuning capability. Some companies sell lubricating oils that slow down the oxidation process, increasing the string's life-span. These special lubricating oils are applied to the strings as a barrier to the air, to help slow the oxidation process.

=== Coating and plating ===
Some common types of metal plating on strings include tin, nickel, gold, and silver. Some metals such as gold and silver give the strings a different sound. Among strings coated with a polymer, (polytetrafluoroethylene) Teflon is the most commonly used. Teflon is resistant to many corrosive agents such as: chlorine, acetic acid, sulfuric acid, and hydrochloric acid. On the microscopic level Teflon has very tightly packed polymeric chains, and these tightly packed chains create a slippery surface that not only helps keep the oil from the player's hands off the strings but makes them smooth to play as well. Ethylene tetrafluorothylene (ETFE) is another polymer that is sometimes used to coat strings. It is abrasion and cut resistant and has many characteristics similar to Teflon.

=== Boiling strings (guitar and bass) ===
Some musicians boil guitar or bass strings to rejuvenate them. The high temperature of the boiling water helps free the strings of oil, salt, and grime from the player's hands. When a string is played, very small metal shavings from fret wear may break off and lodge between the windings of the strings. Heating the strings can expand these particles and separate them from the windings. Some players use deionized water to boil strings, believing that mineral deposits in tap water may aid corrosion of the string core. After boiling, strings may have less elasticity and be more brittle, depending on the quality of the alloys involved. Putting the strings through a cycle in the dishwasher has also been known to work.

== String vibration ==
A string vibrates in a complex harmonic pattern. Every time the player sets a string in motion, a specific set of frequencies resonate based on the harmonic series. The fundamental frequency is the lowest, and it is determined by the density, length and tension of the string. This is the frequency we identify as the pitch of the string. Above that frequency, overtones (or harmonics) are heard, each one getting quieter the higher it is. For example, if the fundamental pitch is 440 Hz (A above middle C), the overtones for an ideal string tuned to that pitch are 880 Hz, 1320 Hz, 1760 Hz, 2200 Hz, etc. The note names for those pitches would be A, A, E, A, C♯, etc. Due to the physical nature of the strings, however, the higher up the overtones go, the more out of tune (or "false") they are to the fundamental. This is an important consideration for piano tuners, who try to stretch the tuning across the piano to keep overtones more in tune as they go up the keyboard.

In a phenomenon called sympathetic vibration, a string seems to vibrate by itself. This happens when sound waves strike the string at a frequency close to the string's fundamental pitch or one of its overtones. When an outside source applies forced vibration that matches a string's natural frequency, the string vibrates.

Resonance can cause audio feedback. For example, in a setup with an acoustic guitar and a PA system, the speaker vibrates at the same natural frequency of a string on the guitar and can force it into vibrational motion. Audio feedback is often seen as an undesirable phenomenon with an acoustic guitar that is plugged into the PA system, because it causes a loud howling sound. However, with electric guitar, some guitarists in heavy metal music and psychedelic rock purposely create feedback by holding an electric guitar close to a powerful, loud guitar amplifier speaker cabinet, with the distortion turned up loud, creating unique high-pitched, sustained sounds. Jimi Hendrix and Brian May were notable users of electric guitar feedback.

For a typical high-E nylon string, the maximum transverse force is roughly 40 times greater than the maximum longitudinal force amplitude. However, the longitudinal force increases with the square of the pulse amplitude, so the differences diminish with increasing amplitude. The elastic (Young's) modulus for steel is about 40 times greater than for nylon, and string tensions are about 50% greater, so the longitude and transverse force amplitudes are nearly equal.

== Tensile properties ==
Tuning a stringed instrument puts the strings under a large amount of stress. Strain is a measure of the stretch or elongation of the strings. As the string is tuned to a higher pitch, it gets longer and thinner. If the string has been stretched past its elastic limit, it will not recover its original tension and will not be tunable. On a stress vs. strain curve, there is a linear region where stress and strain are related by Young's modulus. A newer set of strings will often be in a region on the stress vs. strain curve past the Young's modulus called the plastic region. In the plastic region, plastic deformation occurs—deformation the material cannot recover from. Thus, in the plastic region, the relationship is not linear (Young's modulus is no longer a constant). The elastic region is where elastic deformation is occurring, or deformation from where the string can recover. The linear (i.e. elastic) region is where musicians want to play their instrument.

== See also ==
- Violin construction and mechanics
- Electronic tuner
- Harmonic oscillator
