= Dingjiazha Tomb No. 5 =

- 丁家闸五号壁画墓 (Chinese)
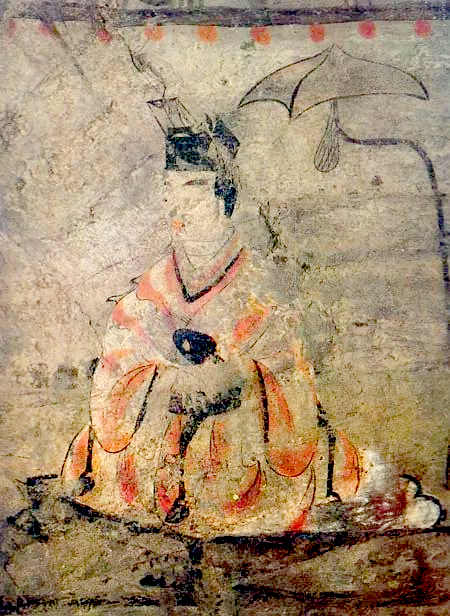
- Portrait of the occupant

- Location within Gansu Location within China
- 39°51′16.8″N 98°26′6.6″E
- Type: Underground tomb
- Location: Jiuquan, Gansu, China

History
- Built: late 4th-mid 5th century A.D.

The Dingjiazha Tomb No. 5 (Chinese: 丁家闸五号墓) is a mural tomb of the Northern Liang kingdom built when the Sixteen Kingdoms came to an end and the Northern Wei Dynasty was beginning, c. 384–441. The tomb was excavated in 1977 and has elements of art found in works from Eastern Han dynasty, Northern Wei dynasty, Jin dynasty, as well as the Mogao Caves. It is located in Jiuquan, Gansu Province, China.

The tomb is divided into two rooms, with murals covering the walls and ceilings of the entry room, creating a multi-level display of the lord's place in the world, between sky above and his workers below. The paintings are done in a mythic style; painted into the peak of the ceiling, overlooking everything (with the whole world and celestial realm beneath it) is a lotus. It is above celestial images of the heavens on the ceiling (nine-tail fox, flying horse, flying human or apsara), which are above the lord and his household in the center (the lord sitting with his servants on one side, those serving him behind him, performers dancing and playing instruments before him), who are above those who work and till the land below.

The image of the musicians and dancers is known as the Music and Bai Opera (乐伎和百戏图 Lè jì hé bǎi xì tú), part of the overall picture of the lord and his domain, known as Leisurely life, travel, and music (燕居行乐图). It features musicians playing waist drum (细腰鼓), flute (长笛), lute (阮咸琵琶), and guqin (古琴). The lute shown here was relatively new to China, or in the process of entering China, and is one of the earliest lute images in China.

== Gallery ==
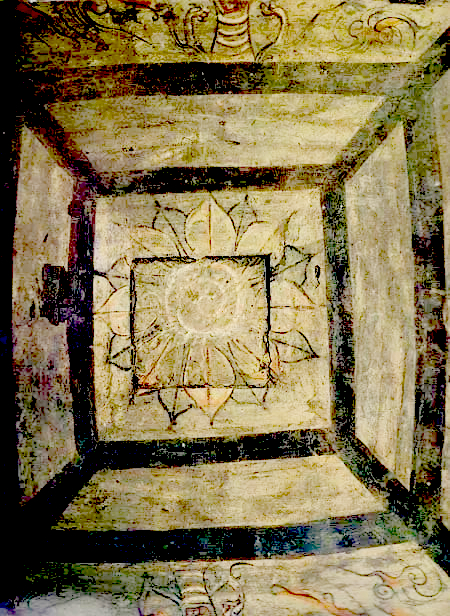
Lotus above the world, looking down on heavens and earth below

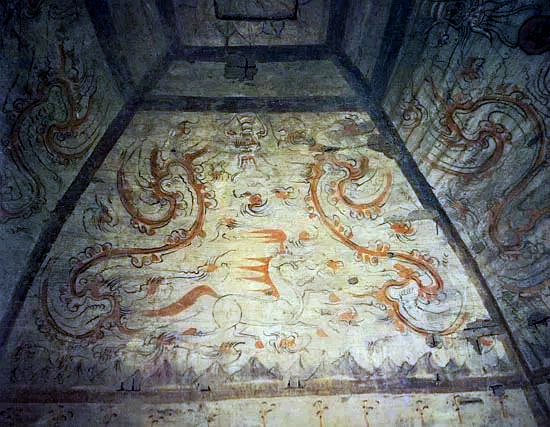
Heavens North ceiling

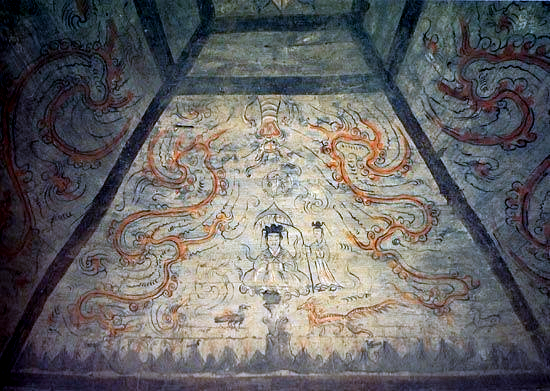
Heavens, West ceiling, Queen Mother of the West, sits opposite to the King of the East, Dong Wanggong (东王公). She is a Taoist goddess, but worship of her predates Taoism.

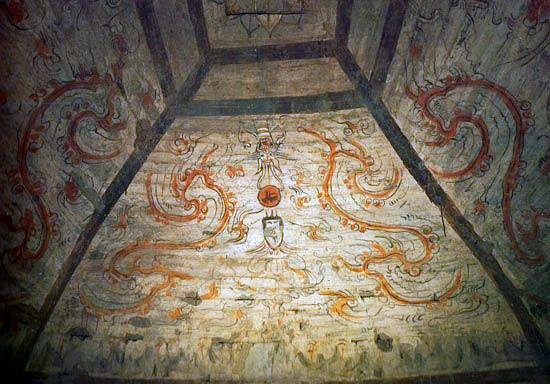
Heavens, East ceiling, King of the East, (东王公 Dōng Wánggōng). He is a Taoist god, also known as the Eastern parent, he sits opposite of the Queen Mother of the West.

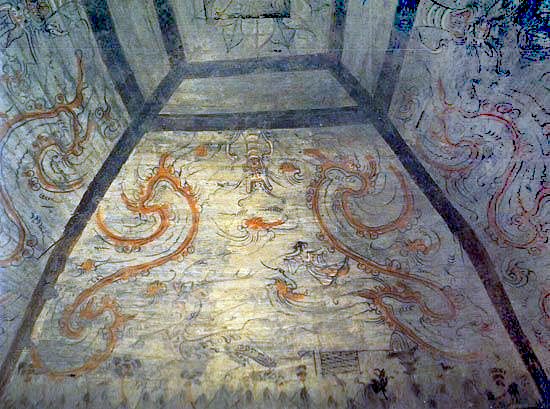
Heavens, South ceiling, a flying apsara or feitian (飞天).

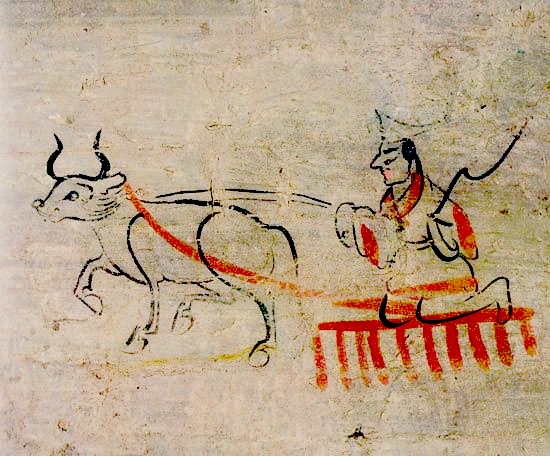
Peasant and ox harrowing field

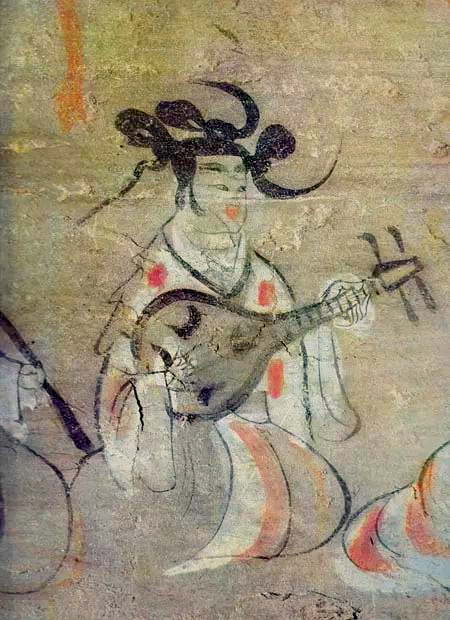
Lute or pipa player

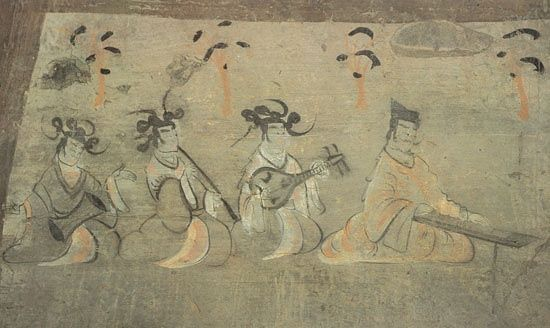
Musicians

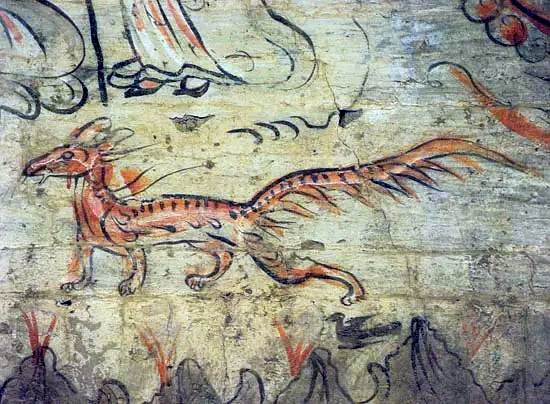
Fox painted into heavens in the tomb art

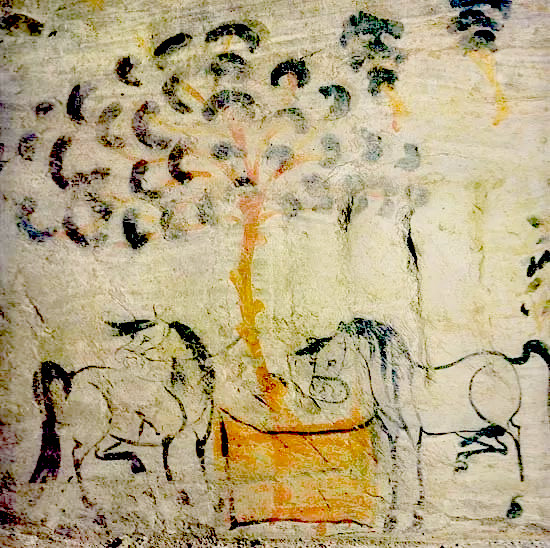
Horses

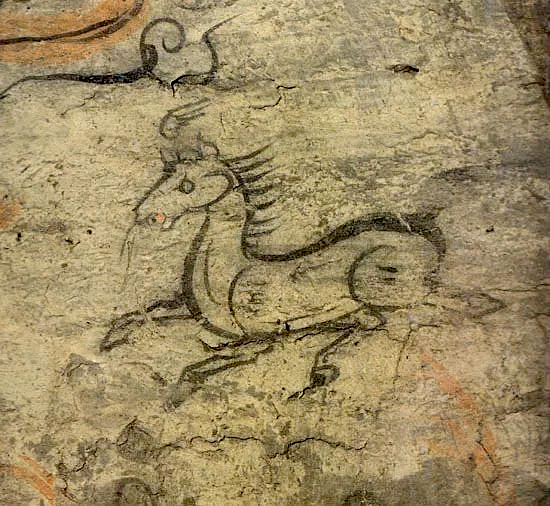
Horse painted into heavens in tomb art

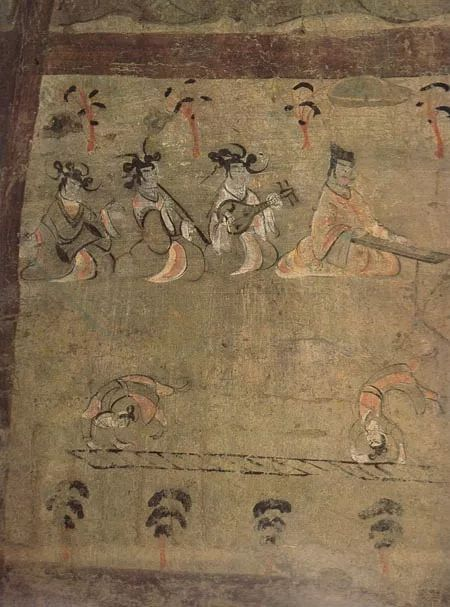
Dancers and musicians

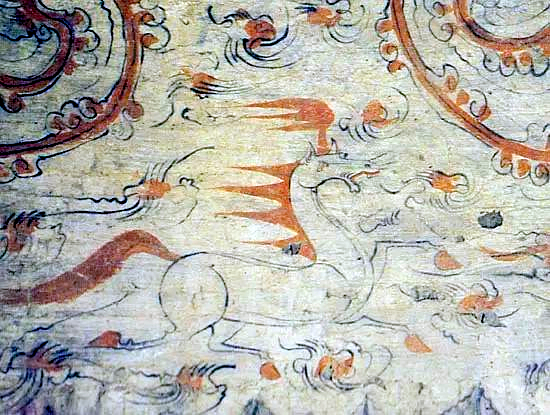
A horse painted into the heavens of the tomb.

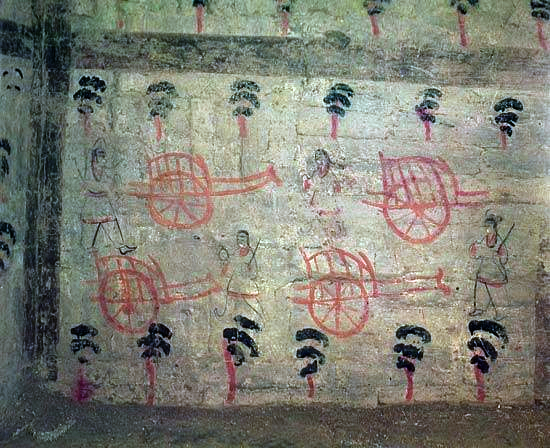
Workers in the fields

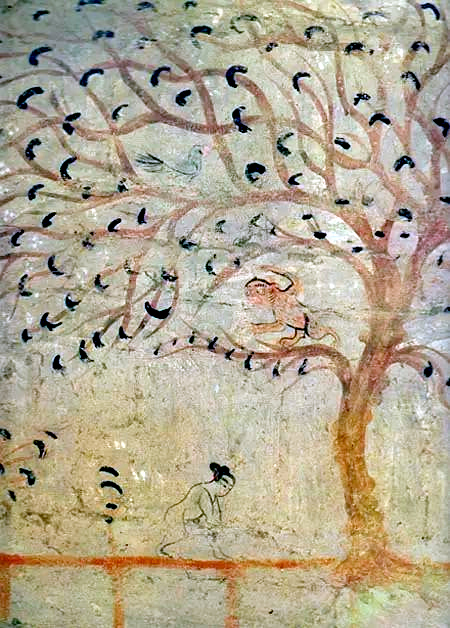
Nude girl harvesting, monkey in tree

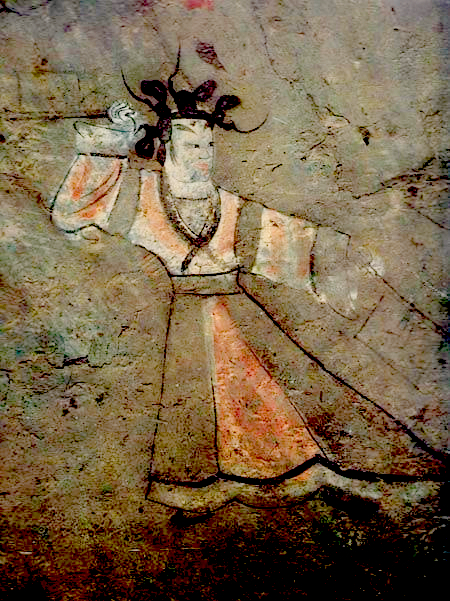
Dancer

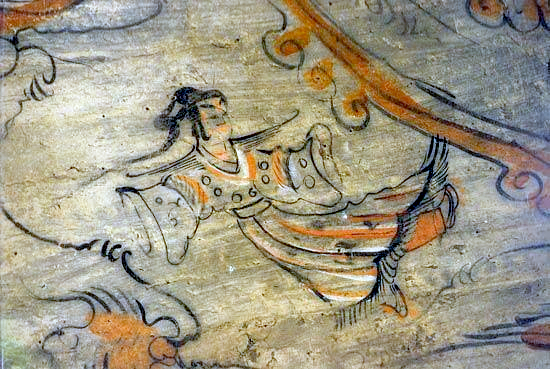
Person flying in skies in tomb painting, an apsara?

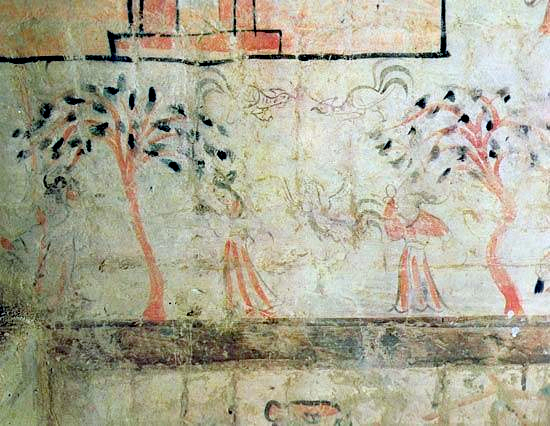
Harvesters in orchard
