= Guild of American Luthiers =

Organization for musical instruments

Guild of American Luthiers (GAL) is a nonprofit organization whose focus is to facilitate learning about lutherie: the art, craft, and science of stringed musical instrument building and repair.

GAL publishes a quarterly magazine, American Lutherie, entirely devoted to lutherie.

In 2017, GAL held its periodic convention in Tacoma, Washington. As of 2018, the Guild of American Luthiers had more than 3,700 members.
