= Intonation (music) =

Pitch accuracy in music

In music, intonation is the pitch accuracy of a musician or musical instrument. Intonation may be flat, sharp, or both, successively or simultaneously.

In vocal music, intonation also signifies the singing of an opening phrase.

== Interval, melody, and harmony ==
The lower or upper pitch of an interval may be sharp or flat, or both pitches of an interval.

If the lower pitch is sharp or the upper pitch is flat, the interval may be said to be flat given that as a whole it is too narrow; while if the lower pitch is flat or the upper pitch is sharp, the interval may be said to be sharp given that as a whole it is too wide. Intervals are conventionally measured from the bottom, as such in an interval that is too wide the upper pitch is thus sharp. Intonation exists within the context of musical temperament, of which there are several types.

However, the interval itself may be in tune, in relation to itself (i.e. both notes of the interval are in tune in relation to each other), but flat or sharp as a whole and thus both notes of the interval are out of tune.

Notes within a melody can be either sharp or flat, or in tune, in relation to the other notes in the melody or other pitches sounding at the same time.

=== Strings ===
With fretless string instruments such as violins or cellos, intonation depends on the exact places the musician's fingers press the strings against the instrument's fingerboard, as well as any pull or push the musician exerts on the string, either along the string's length or perpendicular to it.

The pleasantly "alive" sound of a large string section results from the amount by which each stringed instrument is slightly out of tune.

=== Fretted instrument intonation ===
Several factors affect fretted instrument intonation, including depth of the string slots in the nut, bridge saddle position, the position of the frets themselves, the bending stiffness of the string, and the technique of the musician.

On fretted string instruments, pushing a string against a fret—aside from raising the string's pitch because its effective length is reduced—also causes a slight secondary raise in pitch because pushing the string increases its tension. If the instrument doesn't compensate for this with a slight increase in the distance from the bridge saddle to the fret, the note sounds sharp. Playing technique has some effect on intonation but some amount of intonation variability may be uncontrollable.

Most electric fretted string instruments have individually adjustable bridge saddles, adjustable with a screw driver or Allen wrench. Acoustic fretted instruments typically have either a floating bridge, held in place by string tension, or a fixed bridge, such as a pin bridge on an acoustic guitar. A luthier or technician adjusts a floating bridge simply by carefully changing its position until the intonation is correct. Adjusting intonation on a fixed bridge involves carefully shaping the bridge saddle with a file to alter the string's contact point.

Another cause of poor intonation on a fretted instrument is that the maker didn't cut the string slots in the nut deep enough. If the string is higher than fret height at the nut, the string deflection-caused pitch increase is progressively greater closer to the nut.

=== Other instruments ===
Like unfretted string instruments, the trombone relies on the musician precisely positioning something, in this case the trombone's slide. The slide's pitch adjustment on a single partial is approximately the interval of a tritone on a slide length of over 80 centimeters. The trombonist may use his/her ear to minutely adjust pitch on sustained notes. By coincidence, the position of the bell on most trombones provides a reference for fourth position, but this is not accessible during fast passages and is massively unreliable as intonation varies by instrument make and model. Articulation is also an important consideration when playing trombone: imprecise articulation may add unwanted glissandi to a note not requiring it. Imprecise articulation often ends up as poor intonation and tone.

Woodwinds are manufactured with holes that must be covered or uncovered to shorten or lengthen the bore to change pitch, and (except for flute) require register keys to change octaves. Most woodwind instruments comply to a regular harmonic series of pitches and require one register key to change octaves. The exception is the clarinet, which sounds only every other pitch of the harmonic series. This means that the clarinet, rather than having an octave key, has a "register key" that raises the pitch by a 12th.

Brass instruments with valves have an inherent intonation defect in that valve combinations tend to be sharp. This is because the open horn is in a pitch of (for example) B♭, so depressing the first valve lowers the pitch to A♭. Depressing the second valve in isolation lowers the pitch to A natural. But together, these two valves produce a sharp G natural, because the second valve slide, which is long enough to lengthen a B♭ horn to A natural, is slightly too short to lower the longer A♭ horn to G. Combinations using all three valves have even worse intonation, so instruments need some means to compensate. Trumpets and flugelhorns commonly have saddles or triggers on the first and/or third valve slides to allow lengthening of the valve slides, while on larger instruments like the euphonium and tuba, such devices are impractical. Instead, better-quality tubas and euphoniums are provided a fourth valve, which takes the place of the 1-3 valve combination and allows use of 2-4 in place of 1-2-3. Better manufacturers of three-valve instruments such as Sousaphones often make the third valve slide long enough to partially address this deficiency. Also, many tuba models place the first valve slide in a position where it may be manipulated by the musician with the left hand during playing, which allows tuning for the always-flat 5th partial harmonic at the C below middle C.

Another solution for euphonium or tuba is called a compensating system, and these have been made in both three- and four-valve versions. In a compensating system, the tubing from the final valve is routed back to the first valve, and each of the valves before the final one is fitted with a short valve slide in addition to the normal ones. When the third or fourth valve, as applicable, is depressed in combination with any of the other valves, the additional tubing brings the pitch into tune. This has the primary effect of making the lowest octave playable including B natural (unplayable on non-compensating horns), and a secondary effect of putting low B natural and C natural into tune. Compensating systems add weight and "stuffiness" to a horn, so they are not commonly fitted to tubas. They find principal use in euphoniums, in which virtually all professional models are compensating. Some French horns have an altogether different system: they have a complete set of slides on each valve in B♭, parallel to the F slides. Pressing a separate trigger routes the air through the B♭ slides vice the F slides, and via shorter tubing to the bell. Intonation is less of a problem in French horn, because it usually plays using higher harmonics where use of the 1-3 and 1-2-3 valve combinations is not needed.

== Singing of an opening phrase ==
In vocal music, intonation can signify the singing of an opening phrase. For example, compositions of sacred vocal music, or sections thereof, often only start after the first phrase, meaning that that first phrase has to be intoned according to a traditional (usually Gregorian) melody. Where that tradition was not upheld, an intonation had to be composed afterwards for a performance of the complete work. Johann Sebastian Bach composed such inserts for church music by other composers, for example the Credo intonation in F major, BWV 1081, for the Credo of one of the Masses in Giovanni Battista Bassani's Acroama missale.

== Other related concepts ==
=== Intonation sensitivity ===
Intonation sensitivity is "determined by how the preference for a chord varies with the tuning, or mistuning, of the center note," and may be used to assess and evaluate a known or new chord and its perceptibility as the harmonic basis for a scale. For example, the chord formed by pitches in the ratios 3:5:7 has a very similar pattern of intonation sensitivity to the just major chord, formed by 4:5:6—more similar than does the minor chord. The major or minor triad may be used to form the diatonic scale and the 3:5:7 triad may be used to form the Bohlen–Pierce scale.

=== Semiotic concept ===
The semiotic concept came to musicology from linguistics. In Soviet musicology, it refers to Boris Asafiev’s concept of intonation in music. This concept looks at intonation as a basis of musical expression, and relates it to the peculiarities of different national or personal styles. The basis of the intonation doctrine was laid by Russian musicologist Boleslav Yavorsky (1877–1942) and later developed by Asafiev.

== See also ==
- Musical tuning
