= Dalbergia maritima =

Conservation status
- Endangered (IUCN 2.3)

Scientific classification
- Kingdom: Plantae
- Clade: Tracheophytes
- Clade: Angiosperms
- Clade: Eudicots
- Clade: Rosids
- Order: Fabales
- Family: Fabaceae
- Subfamily: Faboideae
- Genus: Dalbergia
- Species: D. maritima

Binomial name
- Dalbergia maritima R.Vig.

Subspecies
- Dalbergia maritima subsp. maritima; Dalbergia maritima subsp. pubescens (Bosser & R.Rabev) Crameri, Phillipson & N.Wilding

Species of legume

Dalbergia maritima is a species of flowering plant in the family Fabaceae. It is a tree endemic to eastern Madagascar. It grows in lowland coastal evergreen rain forest. It is threatened by timber over-harvesting habitat loss from forest clearance and mining, and the IUCN Red List assesses the species as Endangered.

It is a rosewood, and its wood is often referred to as Bois de Rose.

Two subspecies are accepted:

- Dalbergia maritima subsp. maritima
- Dalbergia maritima subsp. pubescens (Bosser & R.Rabev) Crameri, Phillipson & N.Wilding

== Similar species ==
- Dalbergia occulta, also found only in Madagascar, and similarly threatened.
