= Baroque violin =

Bowed string instrument

A Baroque violin is a violin set up in the manner of the baroque period of music. The term includes original instruments which have survived unmodified since the Baroque period, as well as later instruments adjusted to the baroque setup, and modern replicas. Baroque violins have become relatively common in recent decades thanks to historically informed performance, with violinists returning to older models of instrument to achieve an authentic sound.

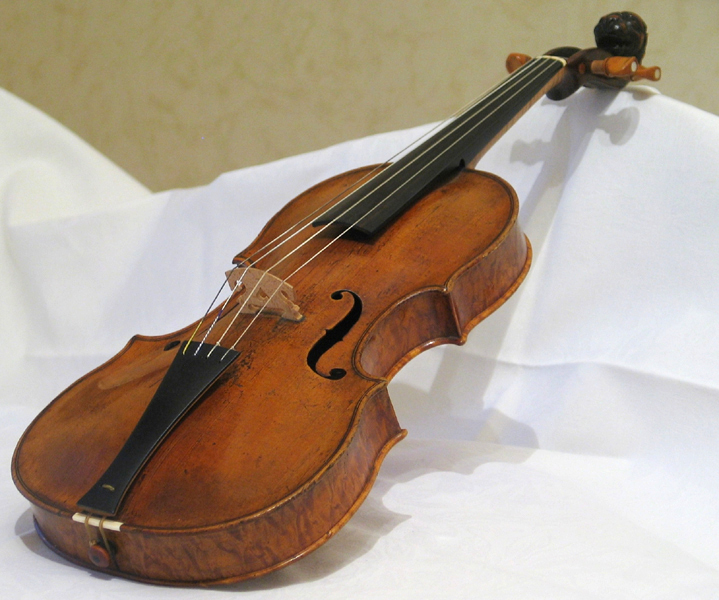
Baroque mounted Jacob Stainer violin from 1658

The differences between a Baroque violin and a modern instrument include the size and nature of the neck, fingerboard, bridge, bass bar, and tailpiece. Baroque violins are almost always fitted with gut strings, as opposed to the more common metal and synthetic strings on a modern instrument, and played with a bow made on the baroque model rather than the modern Tourte bow. Baroque violins are not fitted with a chin rest and are played without a shoulder rest.

== Characteristics ==
The development of the violin started in the 16th century. "Renaissance violins" of this period are of a wide variety of sizes, from small pochette through descant, treble and tenor instruments, as a consort. Around 1610, Giovanni Paolo Cima wrote the first sonatas for violin, marking the start of its use as a solo instrument. The size and broad design of the violin became fairly consistent towards the start of the Baroque period, at about 1660. In subsequent centuries, there were a number of gradual changes to the violin and bow. The main effect of these changes was to increase the overall sound and volume of the instrument, to improve the instrument's performance in higher registers, and to enable longer legato phrases. Today's Baroque violins are set up as far as possible in the manner of violins used from 1650 to 1750.

There was no single standard model of violin in the Baroque period. Then, as now, instruments were made by individual craftsmen, to different fashions. The instruments used to play the work of Claudio Monteverdi at the very beginning of the Baroque period differed somewhat from those of late Baroque composers. As a result, a modern player who plays repertoire from throughout the Baroque period but can afford only one instrument necessarily has to make a compromise with an instrument that has recognisably Baroque characteristics, but matches the instruments of any one part of the Baroque imperfectly.

The neck of a Baroque violin can be at a shallower angle to the body of the instrument than is the case on a modern violin, but again there was a great deal of variation. The neck angle can result in less pressure being exerted on the bridge from the strings. The old neck was also generally glued to the violin's ribs and nailed from the inner top-block through the thicker, more gently sloped neck-heel, while the modern neck is mortised into an opening cut into the ribs and upper edge of the violin. The bridge in turn is shaped differently, with less mass and greater flexibility in the upper half, owing to the high placement of its "eyes"—holes on either side.

The fingerboard on a Baroque violin is also shorter than that on a modern violin. During the Baroque period, the use of higher positions on the violin increased. In 1600, the highest note in regular use was the C above the E-string, while by 1700 the A one octave above the E-string was relatively common (being, for instance, the highest note used in Bach's violin music). Virtuoso violinists throughout the period continued to push the boundaries of possibility, with Locatelli reputedly playing in 22nd position.

Baroque violins are typically strung with gut E, A and D strings, and either a plain gut G or a metal-wound gut G. The guts in question are those of sheep, wound into a material historically referred to as "catline", and occasionally (if inaccurately) referred to as cat-gut.

=== Bows ===
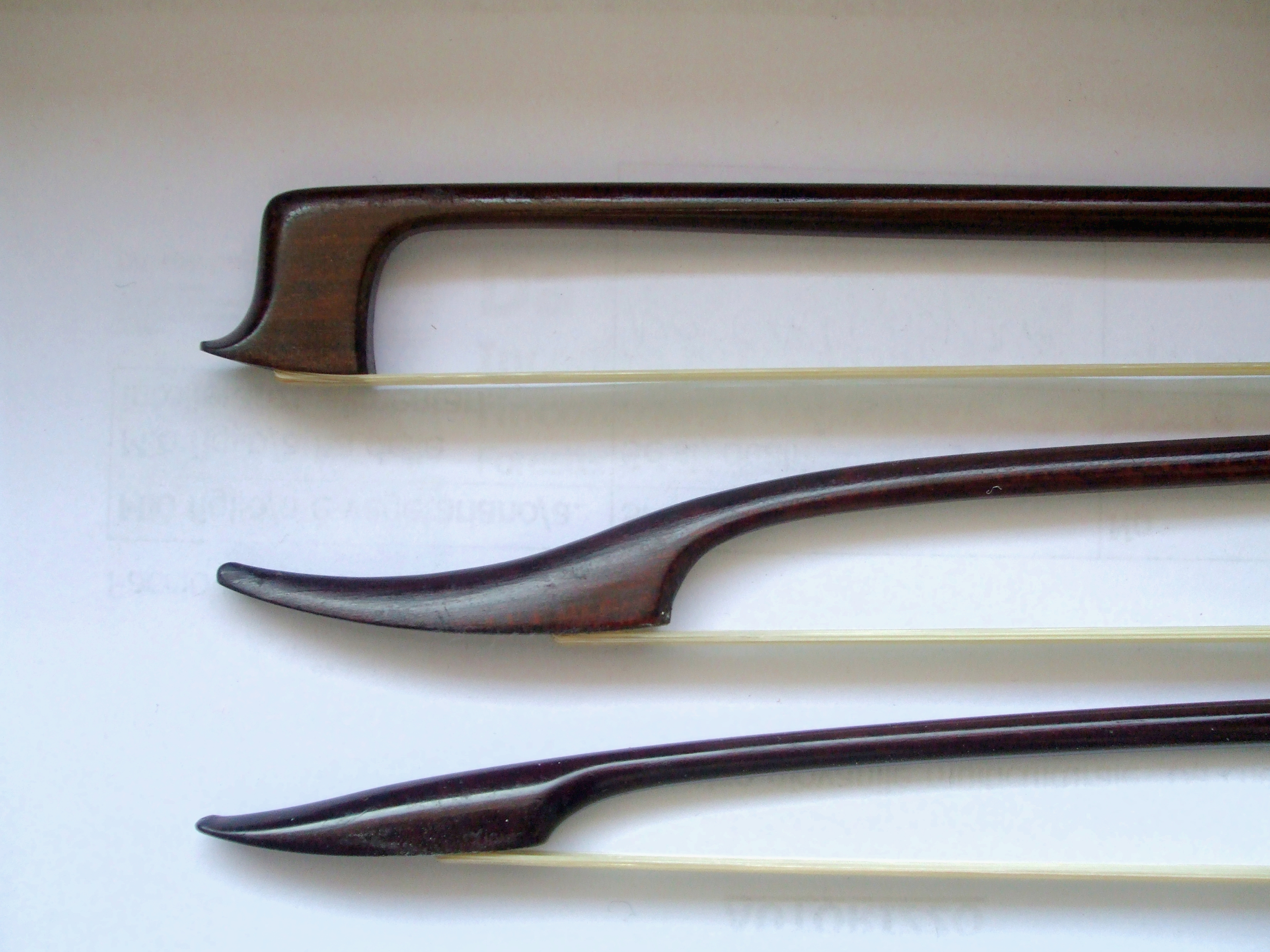
Heads of three violin bows. Top: Late 18th-century Tourte-style. Middle: swan-bill head of a long 18th-century model. Bottom: pike-head of a 17th-century model

Baroque bows generally look straight or bent slightly outwards in the middle, with an elegant "swan-bill" pointed head. They are typically made from strong, heavy snakewood. By contrast, a modern bow is made from pernambuco and has a marked inwards bend, particularly when the hair is relaxed, and has a "hatchet" head at right-angles to the stick.

Bows underwent more changes within the Baroque period than did violins. Bows of the earlier 17th century were used interchangeably between violins and viols. They were particularly short and light, and well-suited for dance music. Italian music of the first half of the 18th century, for instance the work of Arcangelo Corelli, was played with a longer bow better suited to long, singing notes. It was in response to this continued desire for longer, more legato playing that the inward curve was introduced in the mid 18th-century, and the modern bow derives from designs made by François Tourte in the later 18th century.

The screw mechanism for changing hair tension is first mentioned in a French shop inventory of 1747. It was not universally accepted for over a decade as players were perfectly happy with "clip-in" models: a removable frog held in place by hair tension in a mortise carved into the stick, its tension adjusted by shims between hair and frog surface. However, baroque-style bows produced today almost universally adopt the screw mechanism.

Bows were made of the hair of the horse tail.

== Technique and performance ==
Typically, a Baroque violin is played in a "historical manner", using a technique and musical style intended to resemble actual baroque performance as far as possible. Because this style had fallen out of use long before recording technology was invented, modern performers rely heavily on documentary evidence to recreate a Baroque-style technique. They then apply this technique to the music of the period, looking in particular for facsimile or critical editions of the music to play from, as many later editions include editorial "improvements" which depart from Baroque practice.

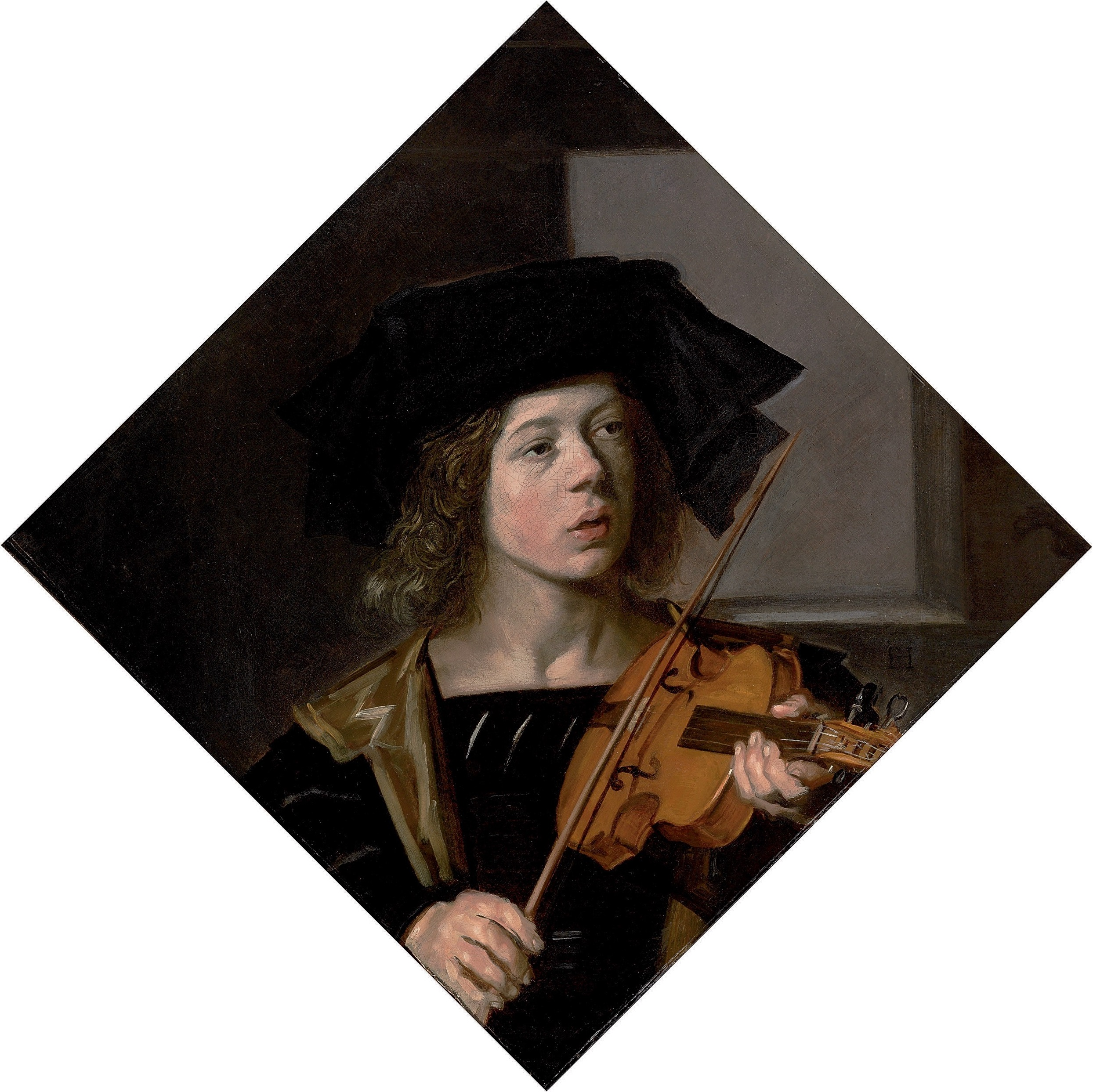
Frans Hals, The Violinist (c. 1625)

=== Holding the instrument and left-hand technique ===
Early violins and violas were typically held against the left chest, below the shoulder. By the 18th century, the typical position was a little higher, on top of the shoulder, with the chin occasionally making contact with the violin. Chin-rests and shoulder-rests are not used – the chin rest which is universally used on a modern violin was not invented until the early 19th century, though Abbe Fils used some kind of device for a similar purpose. Shoulder rests were absent, being a 20th-century invention.

The position of the violin affects the player's ability to shift, and so the range of the instrument. In the chest position it is easy to play in first position but difficult to shift up much. It is easier to shift up when the violin is held on the collar-bone, and it is likely that the movement of the violin up the body and the development of repertoire in higher and higher positions went hand in hand.

Even in the later-Baroque position with the violin resting on the collar bone, shifting is more challenging than on a modern instrument, as the support of the left hand is required to keep the violin in position. (In contrast, modern technique usually has the violin firmly wedged between shoulder and chin, maintaining its position even when the left hand is absent). In particular, shifting down between positions is more difficult.

As a result, players choose fingerings which result in few shifts, or small "creeping" shifts. They choose their moments for shifting carefully, using open strings and points of articulation in the music where changes of position in the left hand can be made inaudibly. While in the Romantic period audible shifts are often used (portamento and glissando) these are absent from Baroque playing. Some Baroque sources indicate the deliberate use of a higher position on a lower string, typically for a piano or misterioso effect, but low positions are preferred on the whole for greater sonority.

==== Vibrato ====
It is generally accepted that vibrato was used much more sparingly in Baroque playing than is typical of Romantic repertoire and that the use of vibrato continuously dates after from the early 20th century around the time of Fritz Kreisler. According to this view, vibrato was used for effect in the Baroque period, on long or stressed notes, but never on short notes or at the end of slurs.

In chapter 11 of his treatise on violin playing, Leopold Mozart writes:

The tremolo [vibrato] is an ornamentation which arises from Nature herself and which can be used charmingly on a long note, not only by good instrumentalists but clever singers... Now because the tremolo is not played purely on one note but sounds undulating, so would it be if every note were played with the tremolo. Performers there are who tremble consistently on each note as if they had palsy. The tremolo must only be used at places where nature herself would produce it....

This belief has been questioned by musicologists who believe there was not universal agreement on the meaning of vibrato or the degree to which its use was appropriate.

Influential Baroque violinist Francesco Geminiani recommended that the vibrato be applied continuously, even on short notes.

Of the Close SHAKE. This cannot be described by Notes as in former Examples. To perform it, you must press the Finger strongly upon the String of the Instrument, and move the Wrist in and out slowly and equally [...] when it is made on short Notes, it only contributes to make their Sound more agreeable; and for this Reason it should be made use of as often as possible.

Composer Jean-Jacques Rousseau wrote vibrato should be used "in all contexts where the length of note permits"

Even authors critical of the use of constant vibrato acknowledged that this was common practice. For example, Robert Bremner writes:

Many gentlemen players on bow instruments are so exceeding fond of the tremolo, that they apply it wherever they possibly can.

The debate on the use of vibrato is complicated by inconsistent terminology and disagreement even on the mechanism of vibrato in writings from the era.

It is now generally acknowledged that vibrato was more widely used in the Baroque, not exclusively for ornamentation, but that the extent to which it was used varied significantly by region, individual taste, and rapidly changing fashion.

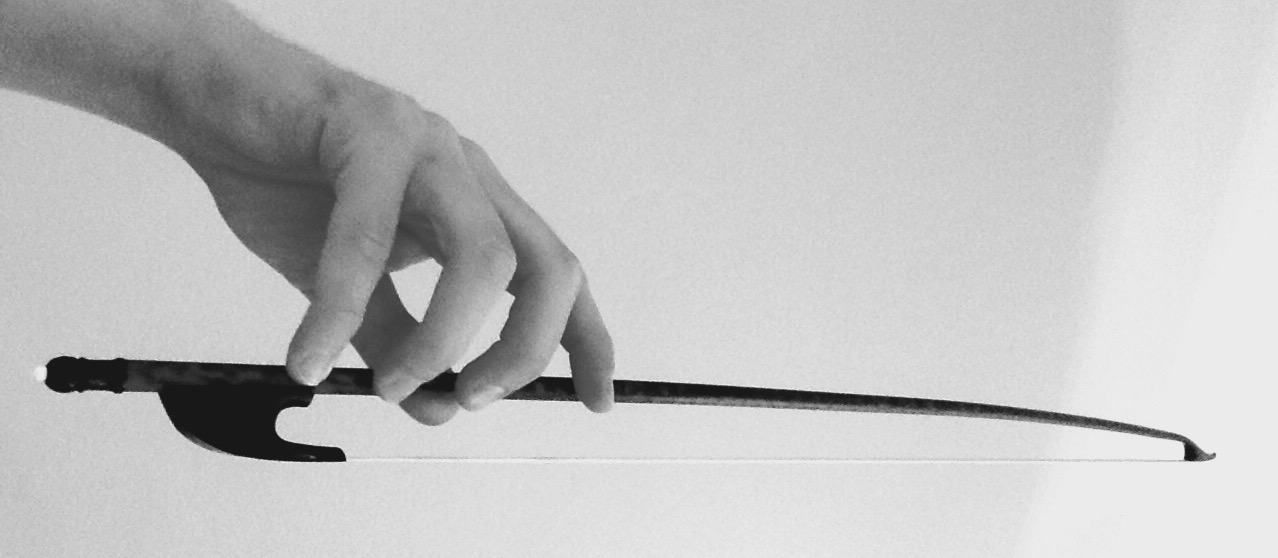
One variant of baroque violin bow holds

=== Bowing ===
Baroque bows are typically held in the same way as modern bows, with the thumb on the underside of the stick towards the frog, though in the earlier Baroque period a "French grip" with the thumb positioned on the hair of the bow was also used.

An important, but often overstated, aspect of Baroque playing is the "rule of the down bow", which says that any stressed beat – and in particular the first beat of a bar – ought to be played with a down-bow. The down-bow is naturally stronger than the up thanks to the action of gravity, and this tendency is even more true with a Baroque bow, which is stiff towards the bottom and middle and weak towards the tip. In Romantic and later violin playing, this natural tendency is evened out as much as possible with the aim of producing clear melodic phrases. However, much Baroque music relied on strong rhythmic emphasis, making the contrast between up and down bow a virtue.

The orchestra of Lully in particular enforced strict bow discipline according to the rule of the down-bow, which was documented by Muffat. While important in performance of dance music, the rules of the down-bow become less important when dealing with contrapuntal German and Italian compositions.

Baroque bows have a much narrower range of technique than do modern bows. In particular, fast strokes in the upper half (detaché and martelé), strokes which initiate with a high level of tension between bow and string (collé), and deliberately bounced strokes (spiccato and ricochet) are all later inventions which are difficult to achieve with Baroque bows, and are inauthentic for historical performance.

Two principal bow-strokes are attested in the treatises of the time. In quick allegro passages, particularly where there are leaps between notes, Baroque players used a short bow-stroke with the notes clearly detached. Tartini advised a correspondent to practice playing semiquavers as demisemiquavers followed by a rest, gradually building up the tempo but maintaining the separation between notes. By contrast, in slower cantabile passages, there should be little separation between notes, but players are advised to start each note softly and develop it for effect, for instance using a messa di voce.

=== Treatises ===
There are a number of Baroque-era manuals of music playing. Among the most important are Francesco Geminiani's The Art of Playing on the Violin (London, 1752; fasc. rpt. London: Oxford Univ. Pr., 1952) and Leopold Mozart's Versuch einer grundlichen Violinschule (Augspurg 1756; trans. by Editha Knocker: A Treatise on the Fundamental Principles of Violin Playing [London: Oxford University Press, 1937, 1948, etc.]). Researchers in historically informed performance also find relevant insights in correspondence of musicians at the time, and also manuals aimed at players of other instruments. However, the use of these sources is far from trouble-free. Sources occasionally contradict one another, and may have left unsaid "obvious" points.

=== Folk violins retaining characteristics of Baroque Violins ===
German baroque violins/violas and viola da amores were still being made by German makers well into the 19th Century; Johann Heinl's workshop in Bohmen produced the traditional old German version of a typical baroque viola in 1886. This traditional style of viola was mainly to be played by local German folk music groups. Another interesting feature of this instrument is that it has tuners similar to the mandolin rather than a pegbox. Heinl's baroque viola plays with good volume and is also well-suited for the orchestra. It can be fitted with a viola E string and tuned to GDAE and played in the same way as a violin.

It was fitted with removable frets so it could be played as a viola da gamba. It could also have a chin rest fitted and be played as a viola da braccio or it could have pegs fitted and be played like a table viola. The fingerboard is shorter which is typical of a baroque instrument and tunes to CGDA as would a modern viola but has a deeper, more richer sound altogether unique in itself.

There were other German violin makers of the same period as Johann Heinl who continued to produce old German baroque instruments for the musician who especially wanted a traditional German violin. One interesting type of old German pattern made by Grunwald has the body similar in size to the modern violin but with the fingerboard an inch and a half longer than today's standard. This change in fingerboard length allowing for the instrument to be strung as a violin with the strings tuning to GDAE or as a viola causing the strings to tune to CGDA or a shorter tailpiece would be fitted to enable tuning to GDAE in the cello octave and be played as a medium size tenor violin. Frets were often fitted and could be easily removed and refitted according to the preference of the player. Grunwald's violin of 1929 has seven special resonance bars that are attached to the underside of the top plate to cause a sympathetic resonance effect that greatly amplifies the sound more like what would be expected of a 16- or 17-inch viola. About this same period did Charles Manby himself invent an instate fretted fIngerboard for his brand of "new style violins" that was an idea born of these late 19th century violins that had baroque period innovations and variations in their design. Another famous violin design that incorporates into its design facets of baroque period variation is the Gusetto which is a baroque period viol design, and the common more modern violin pattern married together, creating an entirely unique violin in itself.
