= Kempter =

Kempter is a German surname. Notable people with the surname include:

- Friederike Kempter (born 1979), German actress
- Lothar Kempter (1844–1918), German-Swiss composer and conductor
- Susan Kempter, American violin teacher
- Michael Kempter (referee) (born 1983), German association football referee
