= Amazonas Baroque Ensemble =

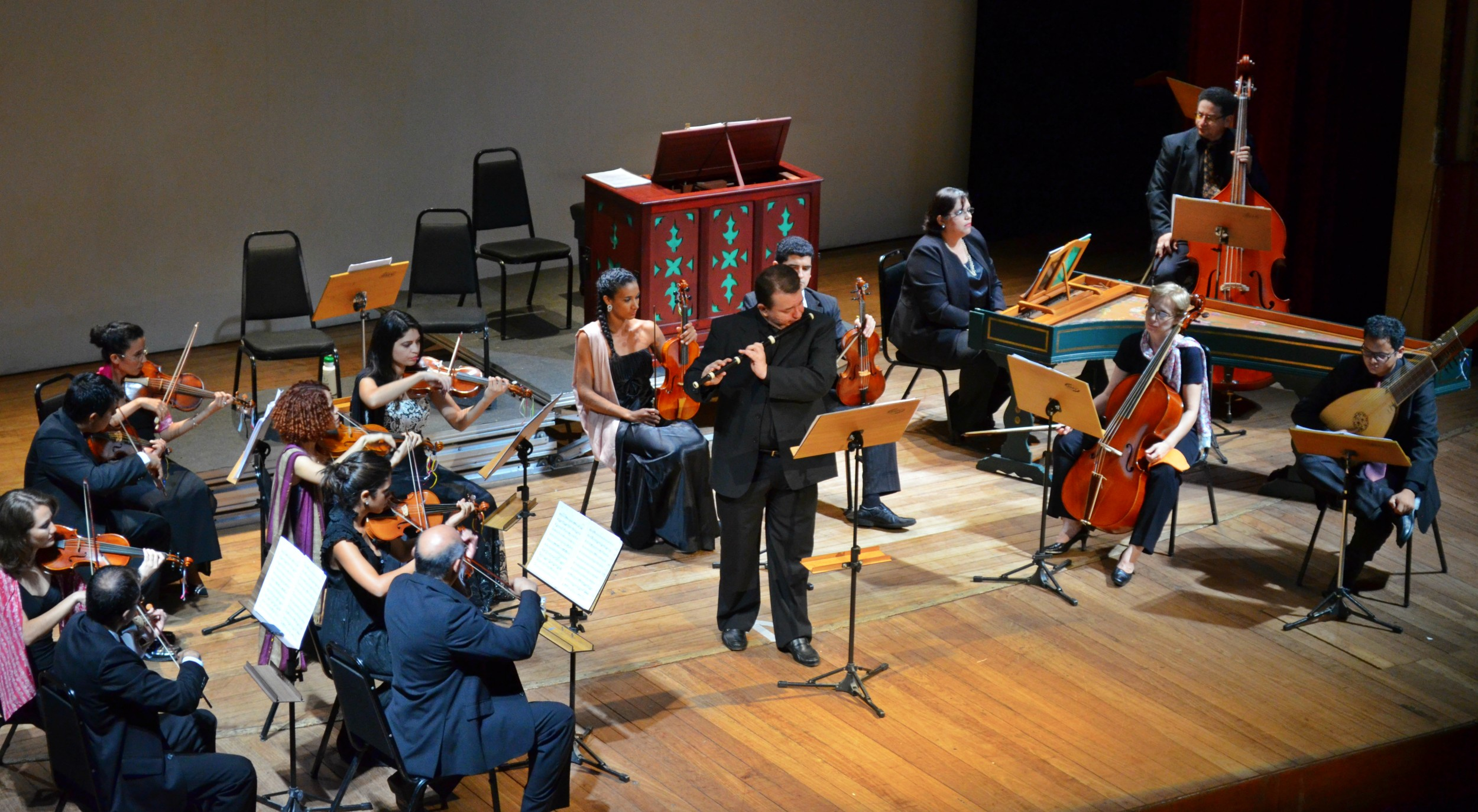

Related instruments
- Baroque violin; Baroque viola; Viol (viola da gamba); Baroque cello

Amazonas Baroque Ensemble – ABE is a Baroque music group based on Manaus, Amazonas, Brazil. Its members join themselves in Amazonas State University as music and musicology teachers and former students. Their aims included restoration of ancient Brazilian and Portuguese repertory, in a historically inspired approaching. Many of them joined musicological research and practical performance projects sponsored by local and federal government agencies, such as Fundação de Amparo à Pesquisa do Amazonas, Petrobrás, Eletrobrás, among others. At this moment ABE performed in many Brazilian and European cities, including festivals (opera, sacred music) and stage productions.

== Musicians ==
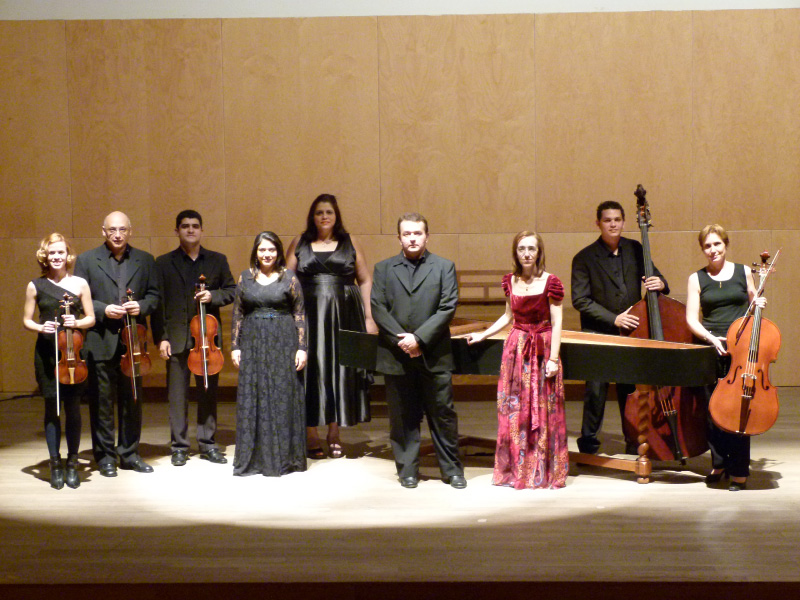
Concert at "Juan Del Enzina Auditorium" in Palazo Arzobispal, Salamanca, Spain

- Mirian Abad – soprano
- Thelvana Freitas – contralto
- Fabiano Cardoso – tenor
- Roberto Paulo Silva – bass
- Gustavo Medina (Spalla), Tiago Soares, Juliana Lima Verde, Andreza Viana – baroque violin 1
- Manoella Costa, Silvia Raquel Lima, Raúl Gustavo Falcón – baroque violin 2
- Gabriel Lima, Elcione Santos – baroque viola
- Edoardo Sbaffi – baroque cello
- Diego Soares, Laércio Gomes – double bass
- Mário Trilha – harpsichord
- Vanessa Monteiro – organ
- Arley Raiol – baroque flute
- Márcio Páscoa – baroque flute and musical direction

== Repertoire ==
- Anonymous (Chiquitos, Bolivian Amazonia, 18th century) Trio Sonata
- Anonymous 18th century, Credo de São José do Tocantins
- Antonio Leal Moreira (1758–1819) - In te confida (Mardocheo recitative and aria from Ester (1786)
- Antonio Leal Moreira (1758–1819) Ah cangiar può d'affetto (Ismene aria in Gli eroi spartani, 1788)
- Antonio Leal Moreira (1758–1819) Amor di questa impresa (Alcibiade aria in Gli eroi spartani, 1788)
- Antonio Teixeira (1707–1774), Guerras do Alecrim e Mangerona (1737) opera jocoseria (in two acts)

-Libretto by Antonio José da Silva (1705-1739)

- Carlos de Seixas (1704–1742). Symphony movement
- Corelli, Arcangelo (1653–1713). Concerto Grosso (Op. 6 nº 8) Fatto per la notte di Natale
- Corelli, Arcangelo (1656–1713). Concerto Grosso (Op. 6, nº10)
- Corelli, Purcell, Handel and J.S.Bach. Trio Sonates
- David Perez (1711–1778). Trio sonata in D minor
- David Perez (1711-1778): Semplicetta tortorella, (Barsene aria in Demetrio, 1766)
- Dietrich Buxtehude (1637–1707). Jesu Meines Lebens Leben
- Giovanni Battista Pergolesi (1710–1736). Stabat Mater Dolorosa (from Stabat mater)*+
- Gluck, C. W. (1714–1787). Que farei sem o consorte. (Rozaura aria from A mulher amoroza)
- Haydn, Joseph (1732–1809). Die himmel erzahlen
- João de Deus do Castro Lobo (1794–1832). Seis Responsórios Fúnebre
- João de Sousa Carvalho (1745–1799). Con tanto riprove de tenere affeto (duet Giulietta e Armidoro in L'amore industrioso, 1769)
- João de Sousa Carvalho (1745–1799). Trio (Penelope, Ulisse and Icario in Penelope nella partenza da Sparta, 1782)
- João de Sousa Carvalho (1745–1799). Se l'interno affano mio (Alcione ária in Alcione, 1787)
- João de Sousa Carvalho. Padre, amico, non piangete (Isacco aria, from Isacco figura del redentor)
- José Maurício Nunes Garcia (1767–1830). Lauda Sion (1809)
- José Mauricio Nunes Garcia (1767–1830). Laudate Dominum
- José Mauricio Nunes Garcia (1767–1830). Laudate Pueri
- José Maurício Nunes Garcia (1767–1830). Creator alme siderum
- José Maurício Nunes Garcia (1767–1830). Te Christe solum novimus (1800)*
- José Palomino (1755–1810). Concert for violin (ca.1804, first movement)
- José Palomino (1755–1810). Harpsichord concerto
- Niccolo Jommelli (1714-1774): Ah, non son io che parlo (Fulvia aria in Ezio, 1772)
- Niccolò Jommelli (1714–1774). Nasce al bosco in rozza cuna, (Varo aria in Ezio, 1772)
- Nicolò Porpora (1686–1768). Lungi dal ben che s'ama (aria from Or che d'orrido verno)*
- Telemann, Georg Phillip (1681–1767). Ouverture e minor for flute and strings

== Gallery ==
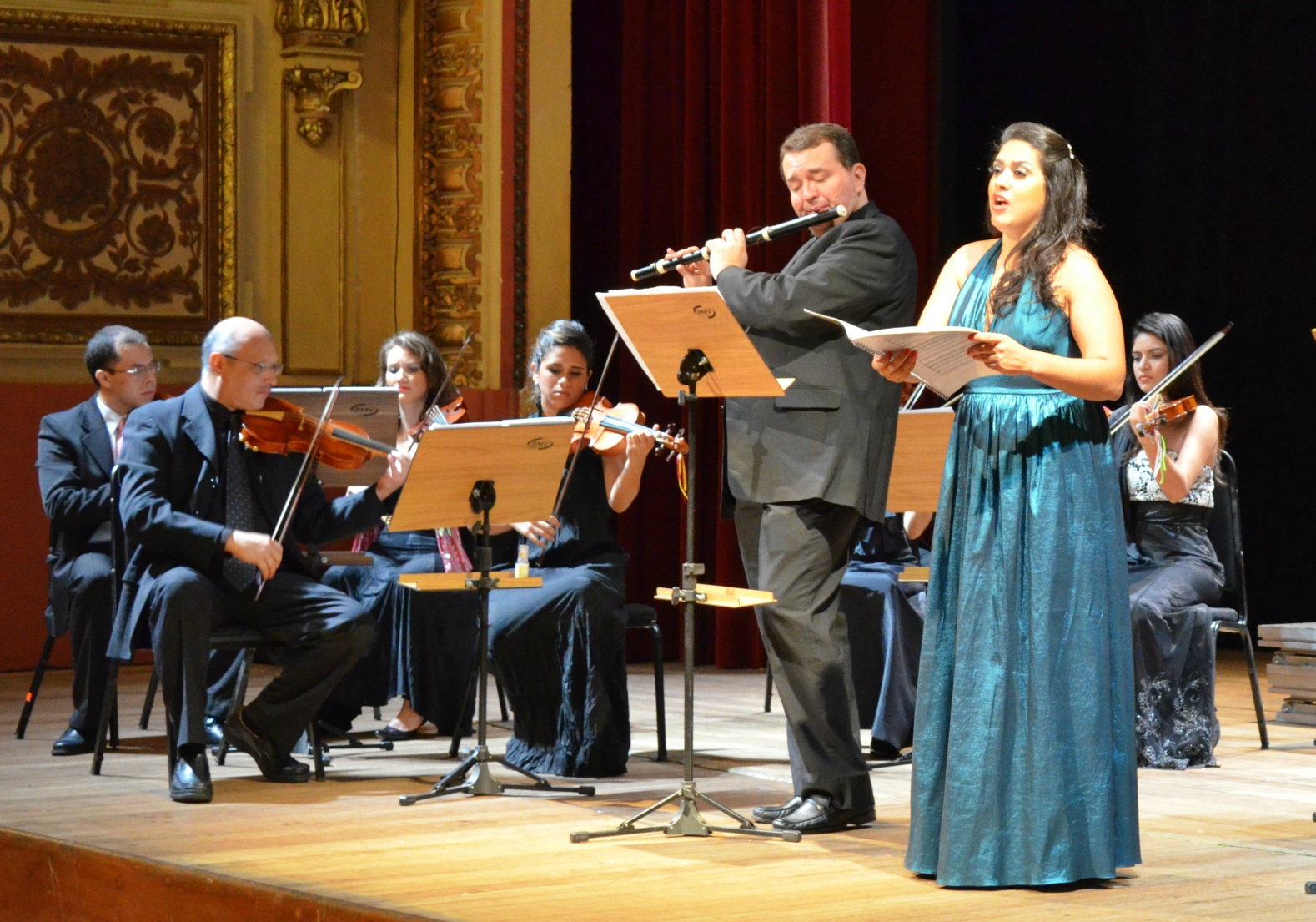
Concert at The Amazon Theater, 2013

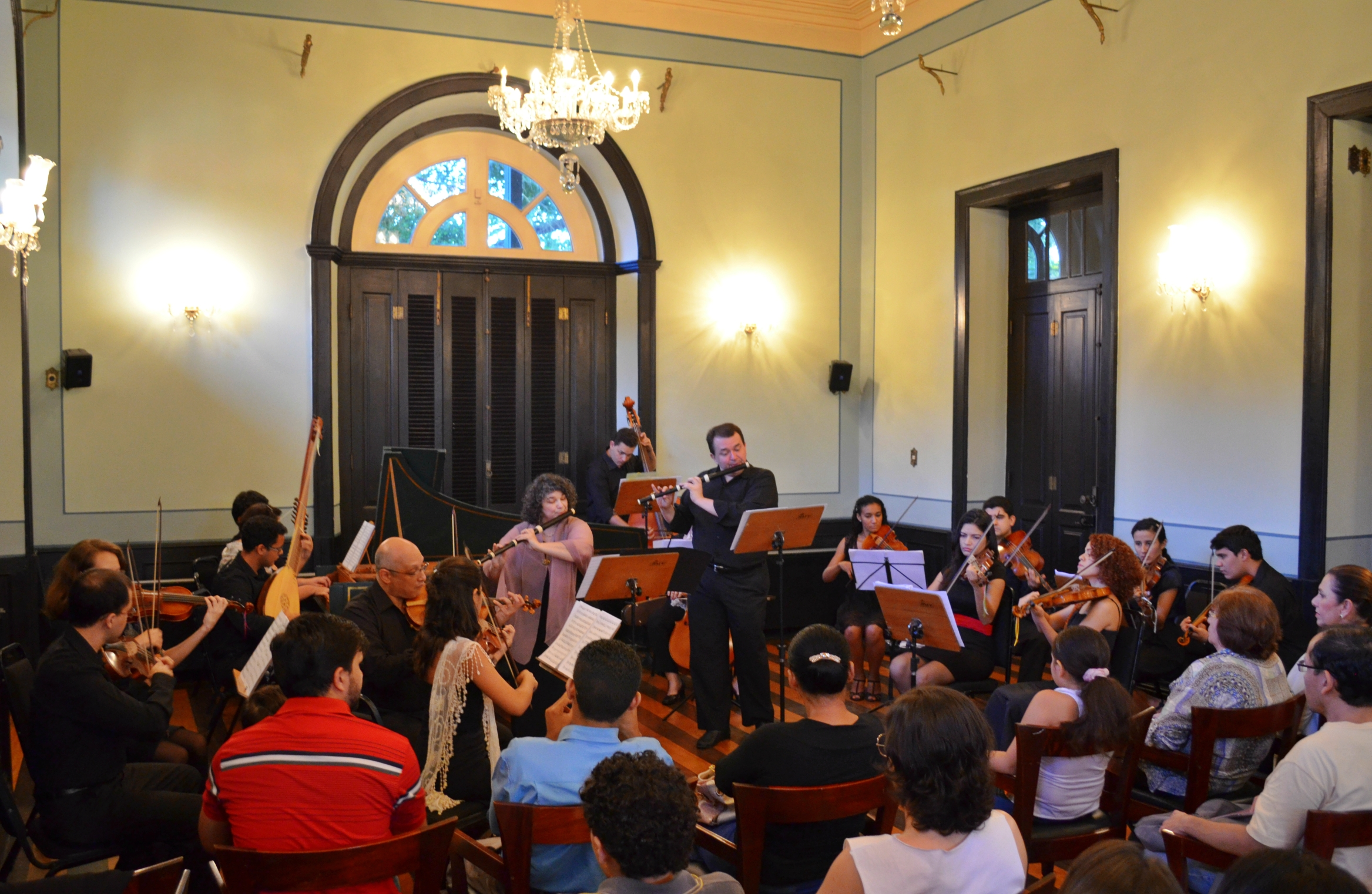
Concert at Palácio Rio Negro

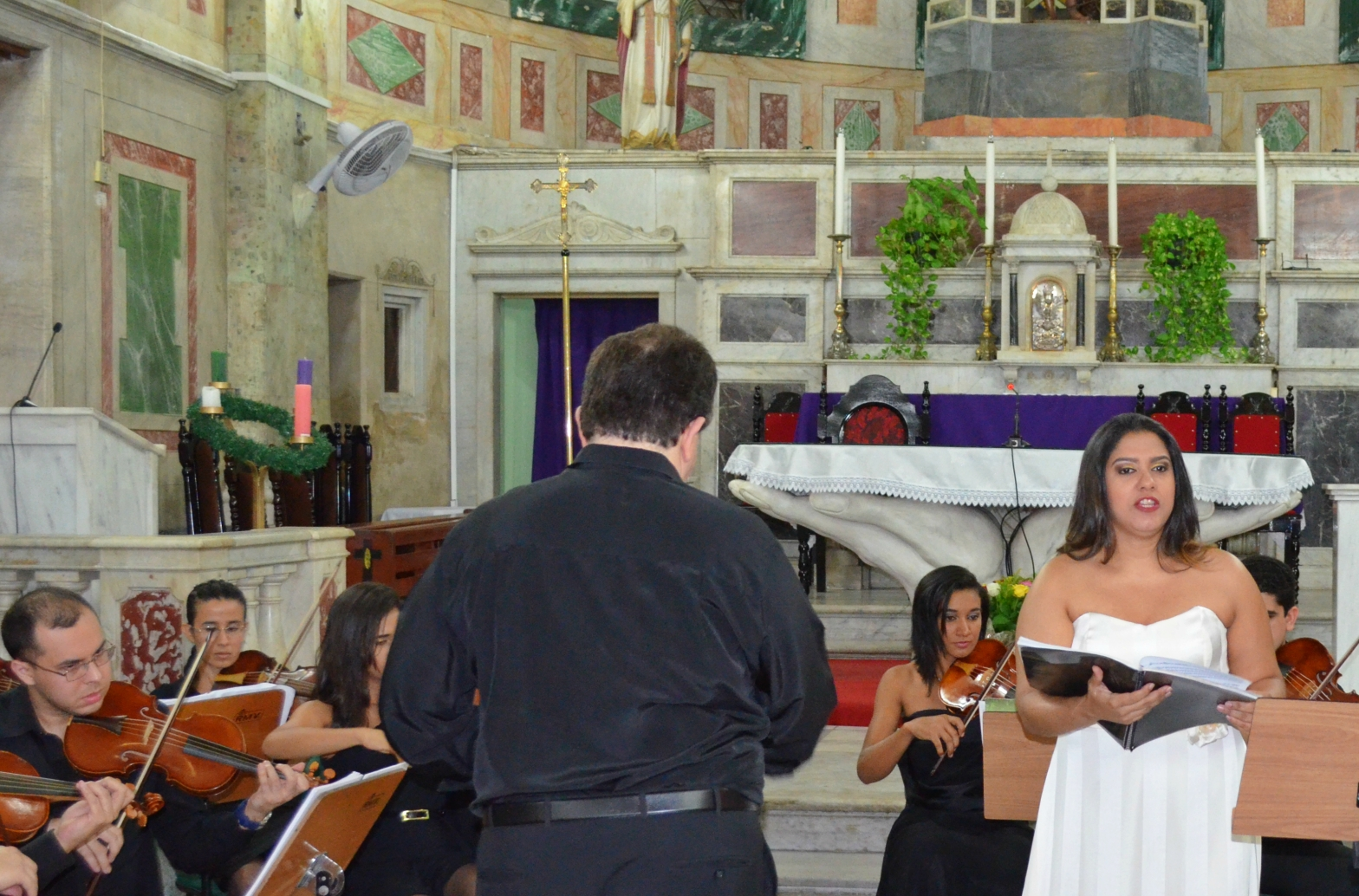
Concert at Igreja de São Sebastião
