= Chinrest =

Musical instrument accessory

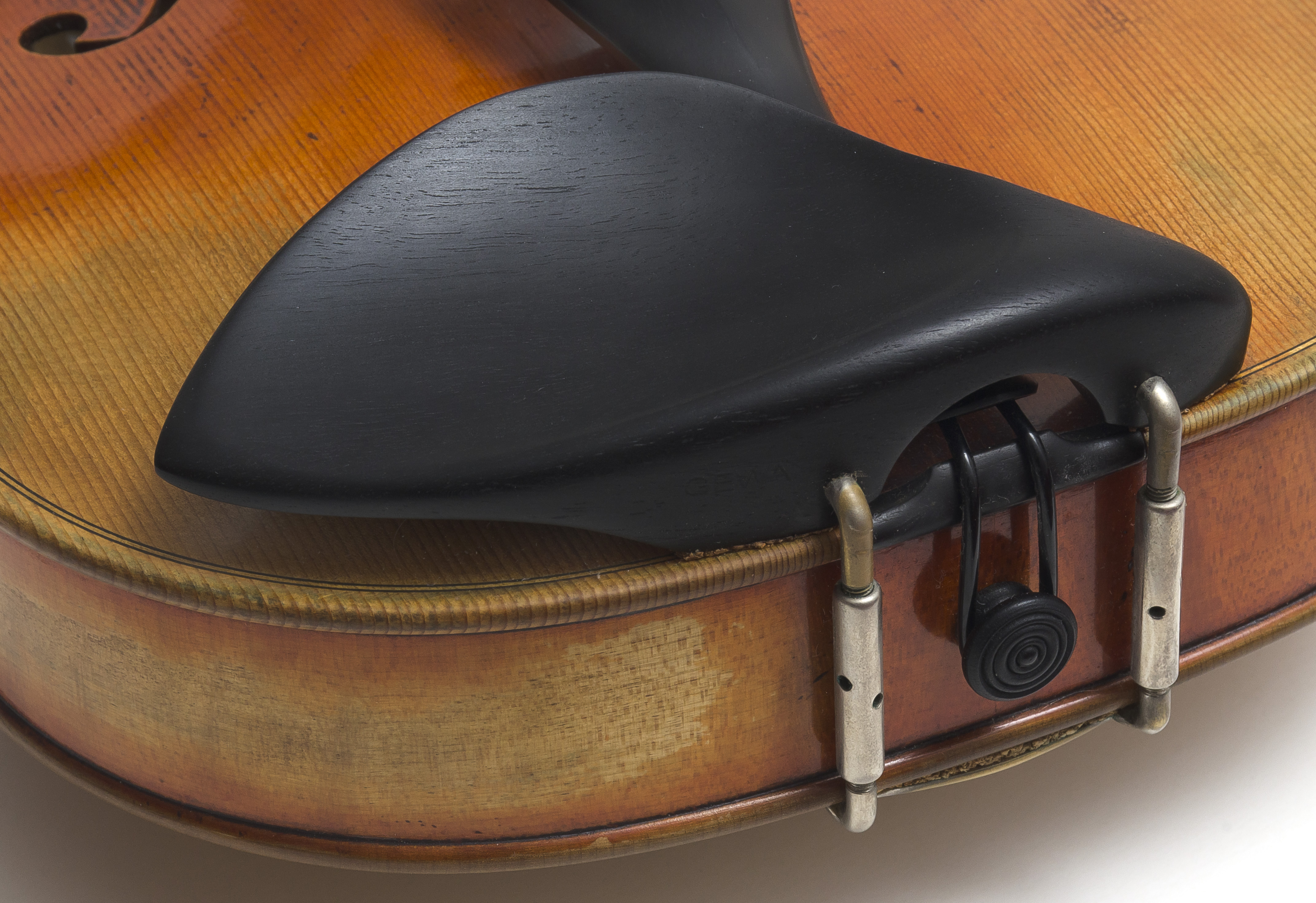
Chinrest on a violin

A chinrest is a shaped piece of wood (or plastic) attached to the body of a violin or a viola to aid in the positioning of the player's jaw or chin on the instrument. The chinrest may be made of ebony, rosewood, boxwood, or plastic.

== History ==
The chinrest was invented by Louis Spohr in the early 19th century, about 1820. Historically, this has been explained as a response to increasingly difficult repertoire which demanded freer left hand techniques than had previously been used; however, Spohr intended his small block attached to the bout to protect the tailpiece, which he reportedly broke with his vigorous playing. However, after being promoted by prominent violinists of the day, such as Pierre Baillot and Giovanni Battista Viotti, it gained quick acceptance among most violinists and violists and is today considered a standard part of the violin and viola.

== Chinrest attachment ==
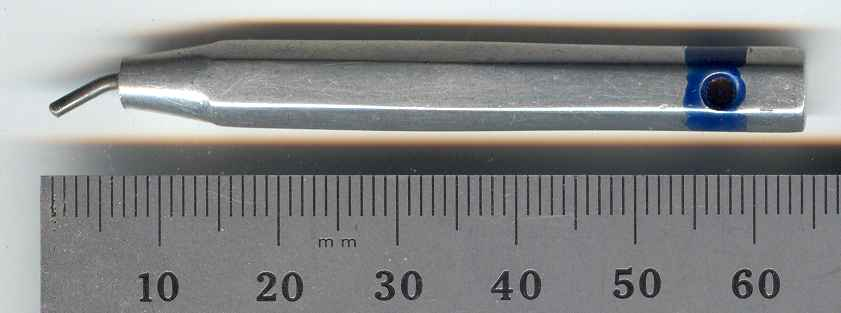
Chinrest clamp wrench

The chinrest is attached to the instrument by one or two metal clamps that hook over the edge of the back. One or two turnbuckles or machine screws provide slight clamping tension to hold the chinrest in place. In most cases, two screws are joined by a metal bar that conforms to the back edge of the instrument, whereas "Hill-style" clamps are used in a pair, each clamp having its own foot and its own screw, with no bar joining them. The clamps and the chinrest itself are usually padded with cork, leather, or felt where they contact the instrument to minimize damage to the wood.

For side-mount chinrests, the clamp is placed on the bass side of the instrument; center-mount rests are placed so that the chinrest straddles the tailpiece. The latter may be considered a safer installation, as the clamps get support from the bottom block, and there is less chance that overtightening will cause damage.

A special pin wrench may be used for easy adjustment of the clamp tension without damaging the rib of the violin. The clamps of some modern chinrests are adjusted with a Torx or small Phillips screwdriver, or with a hex key.

== Types ==
Spohr's original design called for a small block of wood to be centered over the tailpiece, but soon evolved. Today, there are at least 50 different types of chinrests available.

Most common models of chinrests in ebony and rosewood

One of the most popular type of chinrest is the "Guarneri" type, whose attachment is centered over the tailpiece with the cup for the chin to the left of the tailpiece.

Some players prefer a chinrest with the cup centered over the tailpiece. The "Flesch" chinrest is of this type.

As described in the preceding section, some chinrests attach to the left of the end pin.

Chinrests are available in different heights and shapes. Violin and viola pedagogue Susan Kempter advocates having a luthier customize the chinrest by shaping it to fit the player's jaw properly and either raising or reducing the height until it fits the player's neck height as well.

== Other considerations ==
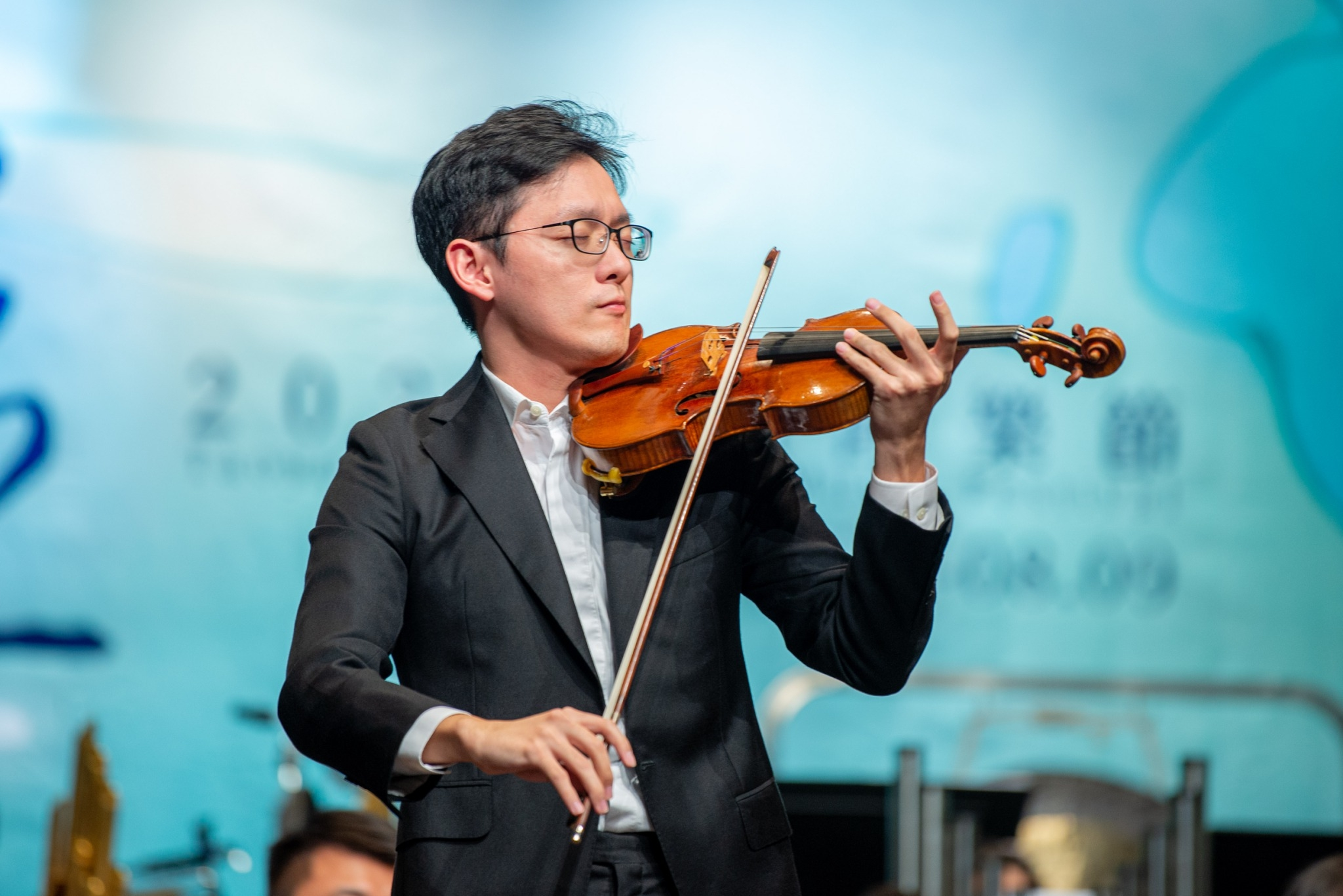
Typical usage of the chinrest for a violinist

The chinrest should be placed so it does not touch or buzz against the tailpiece or belly of the instrument.

Pressure from the chinrest against the player's skin can result in a common irritation known as "fiddler's neck" or "plague". It can also be caused by bacteria or fungus living on the wood or by an allergic reaction to the metals used in the chinrest. Some players prefer to use a cloth, such as a handkerchief, to cover the chinrest, to avoid this irritation and make playing more comfortable. Several types of padded fabric slipcovers are also commercially available. They may not only cover the chinrest cup, but also extend to provide a barrier between the metal clamp hardware and the skin—beneficial if the hardware is plated with nickel and the player is allergic to the metal. Hypo-allergenic chinrests (with plastic or titanium fittings) are also available.

Vociferous debate may be elicited in some circles by suggesting that a violin sounds better without a chinrest, or that better technique and posture is developed without it. The chinrest did not significantly increase the playability of the violin. It has been suggested that Paganini played without a chinrest, and there is significant evidence to suggest; he played mostly on a short-necked violin more akin to the Baroque instrument, and used gut strings, and is always depicted in his famous posture—that is further suggestion he isn't using a chinrest. A few professionals today also eschew the use of a chinrest on their modern instruments.

== See also ==
- Shoulder rest
