= Shoulder rest =

Accessory used for violins and violas

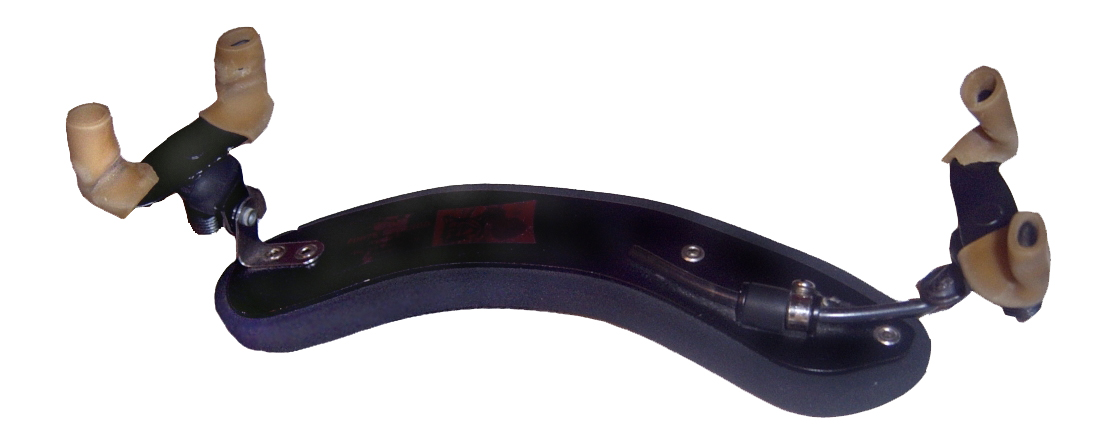
Shoulder rest for violin

The shoulder rest is an accessory that can be found on violins and violas. The shoulder rest appeared around the middle part of the 20th century. It may be made of wood, aluminium, carbon fiber or plastic. Usually, the shoulder rest attaches to the edge of the back of the violin with "feet" padded with rubber tubing or made of soft plastic. The goal of a shoulder rest is to allow a more comfortable attitude while playing by adding height to the shoulder and preventing the instrument from slipping. A shoulder rest generally follows the curve of the shoulder; some shoulder rests are bendable, others are made of sponge-like material, and a few have an extension that hooks further over the shoulder for stability.

== Function ==
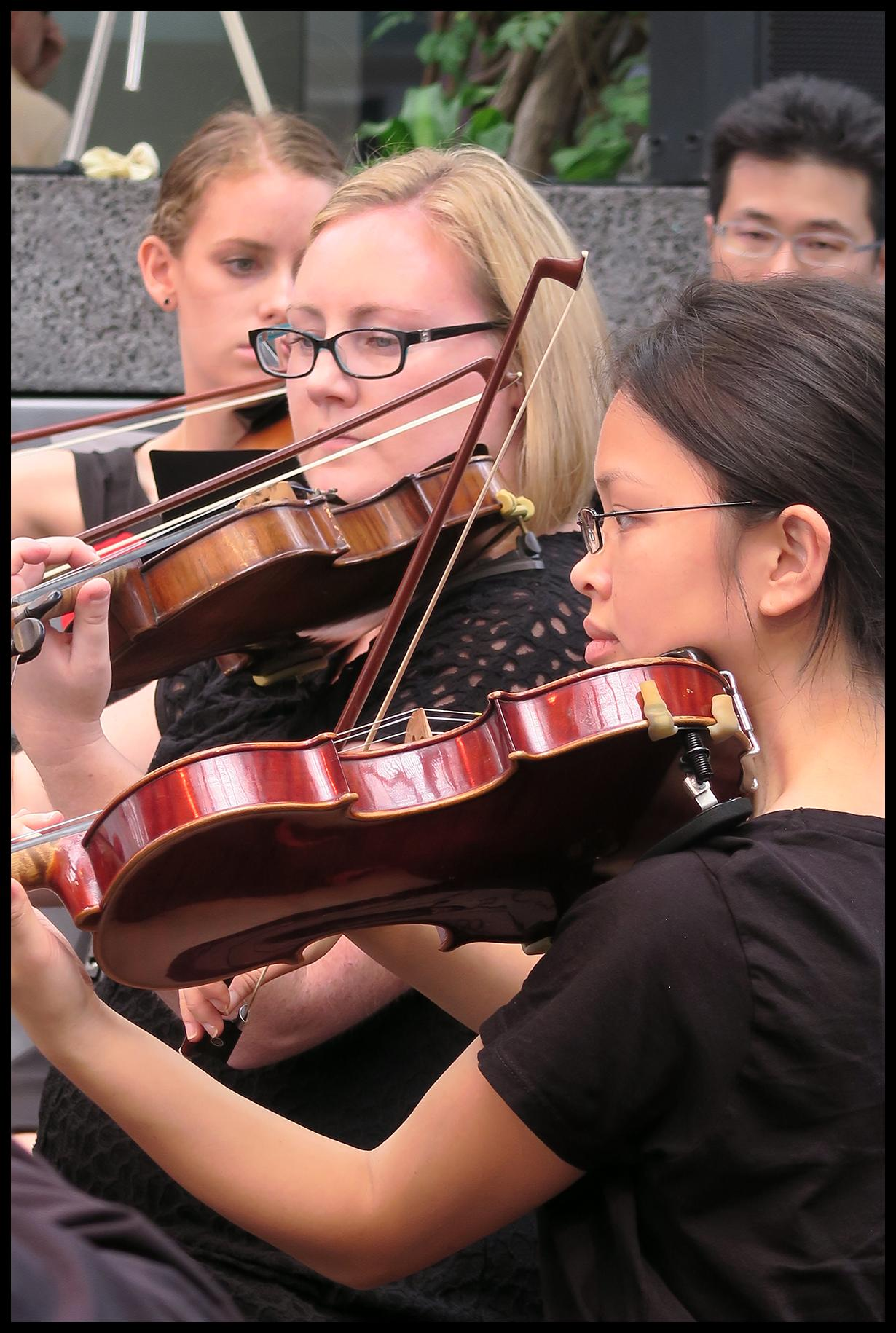
A violinist using a shoulder rest at Queen Street Mall in Brisbane, Australia

A shoulder rest, whatever its design, is an accessory to facilitate holding the instrument in place while playing. This can lighten the task of the left hand, enabling smoother and lighter shifting technique. All rests must make a compromise between violin support and freedom (or flexibility in holding the violin). There are both soft rests and rigid rests on the market.

The shoulder rest is an invention of the middle part of the 20th century. Prior to its invention, violinists and violists employed a number of strategies to hold their instruments: the violin in particular was often depicted in the 16th, 17th and 18th centuries being held on or below the collarbone, though this does restrict shifting somewhat. Leopold Mozart is portrayed holding his violin quite low on his shoulder. Large violas were sometimes played with the aid of straps around the neck, and violins could occasionally be attached to the players' cravat. There are two common approaches to playing without a shoulder rest. The first is to hold the violin horizontal with the support of the left hand at all times. This usually decreases the mobility of the thumb during downshifts and requires the thumb never to leave the neck of the violin in order to support the instrument. The second approach is to support the instrument almost fully at the neck-shoulder region, often requiring the use of some form of padding beside the collar bone to bring the violin closer to the jaw and to hold the instrument in place. Some violinists may even raise their shoulder to achieve this, particularly when shifting positions and when using vibrato.

Modern musicians who chose not to use shoulder rests may also prefer in its place a thin sponge or a cloth. Some instruments have also been marked by shoulder rests due to friction on the wood or added tension to the instrument.

== See also ==
- Chinrest
