= Susan Kempter =

American music teacher

Susan Kempter is an American violin teacher and prominent Suzuki teacher trainer who specializes in applying interdisciplinary research to music pedagogy. She is an active promoter of teaching students to play musical instruments with both physical as well as musical demands in mind, so that they can play their instruments without the pain and repetitive stress injuries which are common in the profession. She was influenced by the teaching of Paul Rolland and John Kendall. She is the director of a violin performing group, Mad About Music, in Albuquerque, NM, which exemplifies her teaching methods.

She was the founding director of String Pedagogy at the University of New Mexico, and is well as a frequent speaker and workshop specialist for the American String Teachers Association, Music Teachers National Association, and the Suzuki Association of the Americas. She is the author of several articles and books dealing with violin pedagogy, including How Muscles Learn: Teaching the Violin with the Body in Mind.
