= Tailpiece =

Musical instrument part

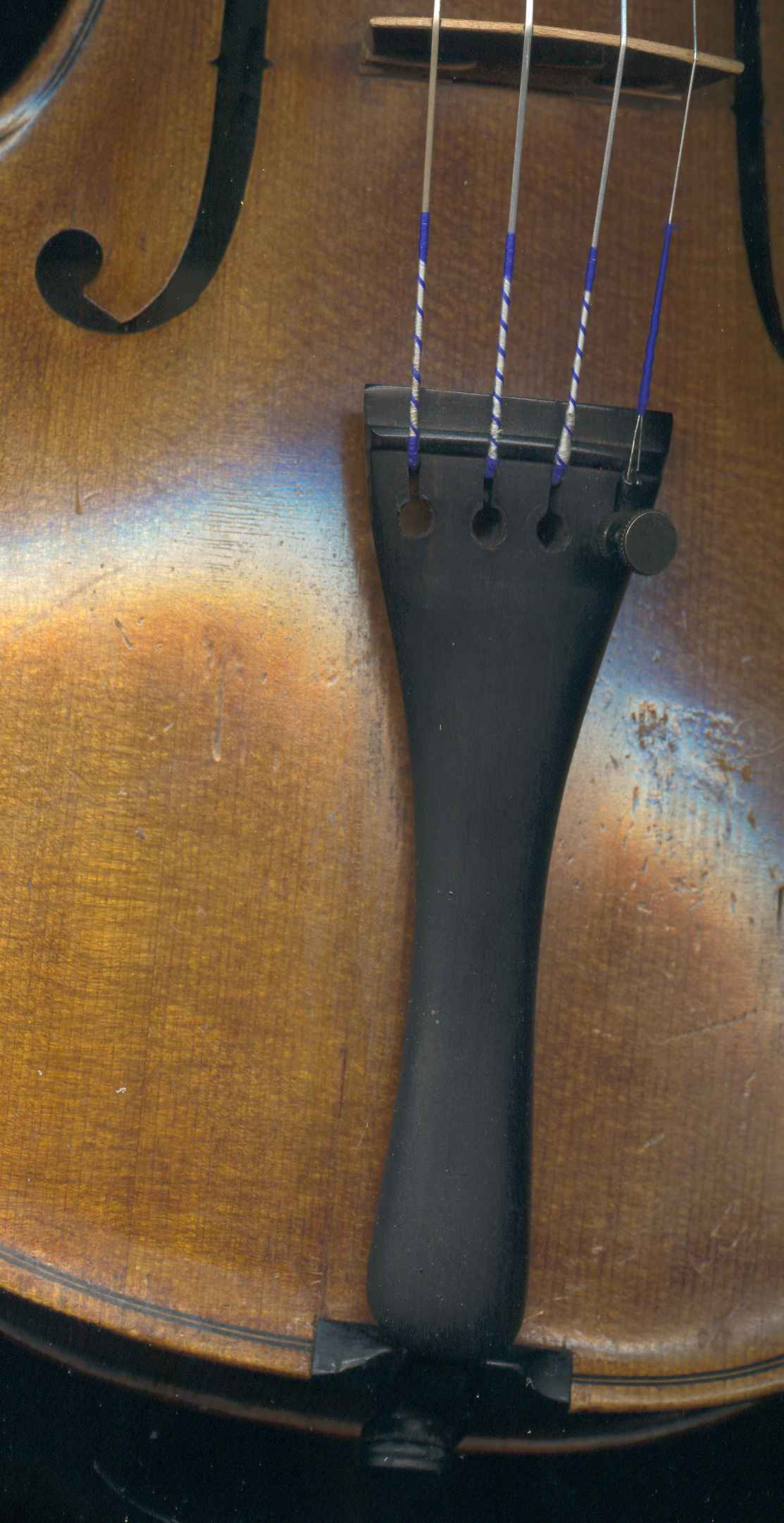
This violin tailpiece has one fine tuner on the E string.

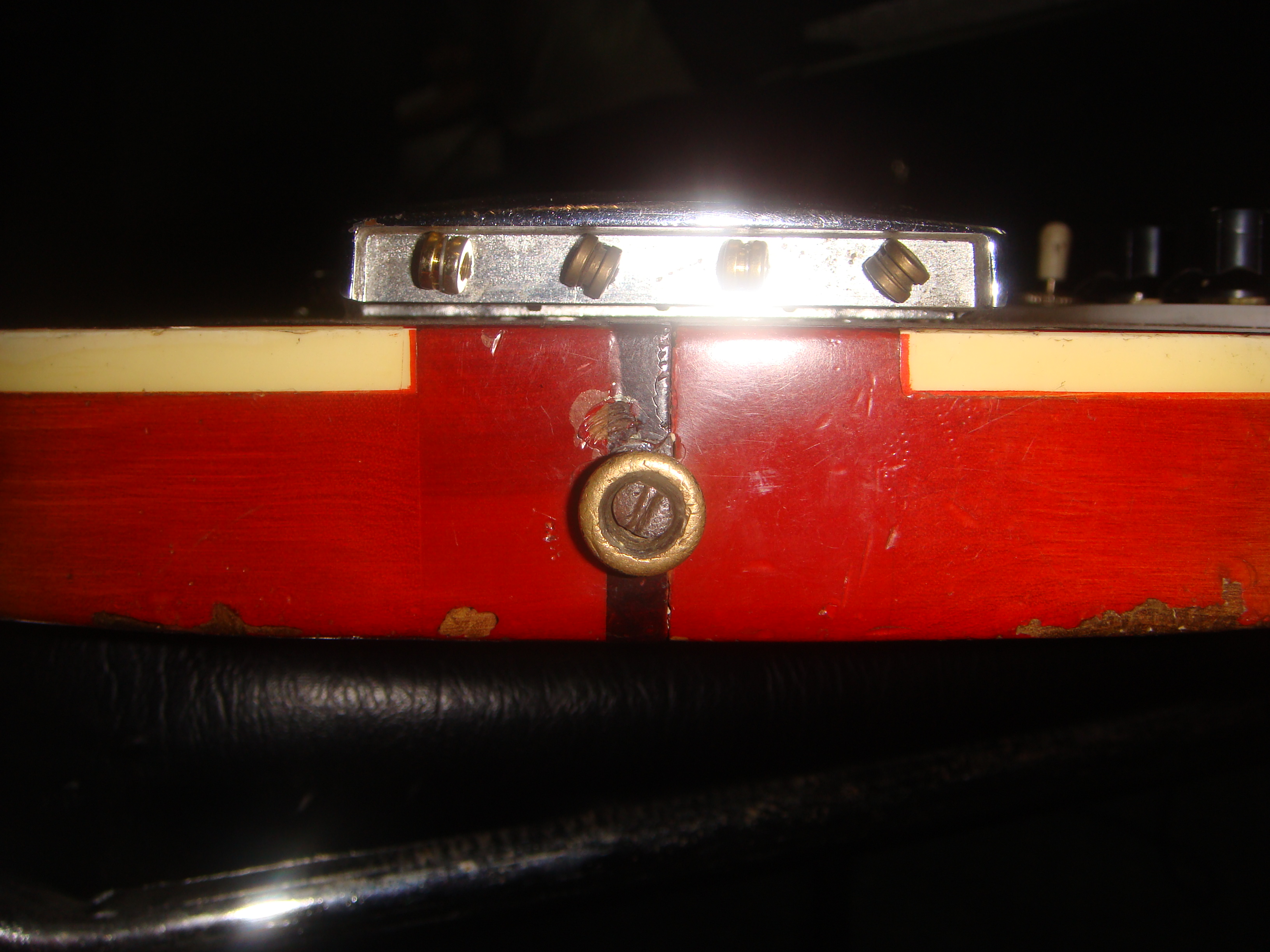
Bass guitar tailpiece

A tailpiece is a component on many stringed musical instruments that anchors one end of the strings, usually opposite the end with the tuning mechanism as scroll, headstock, peghead, etc...

== Function and construction ==
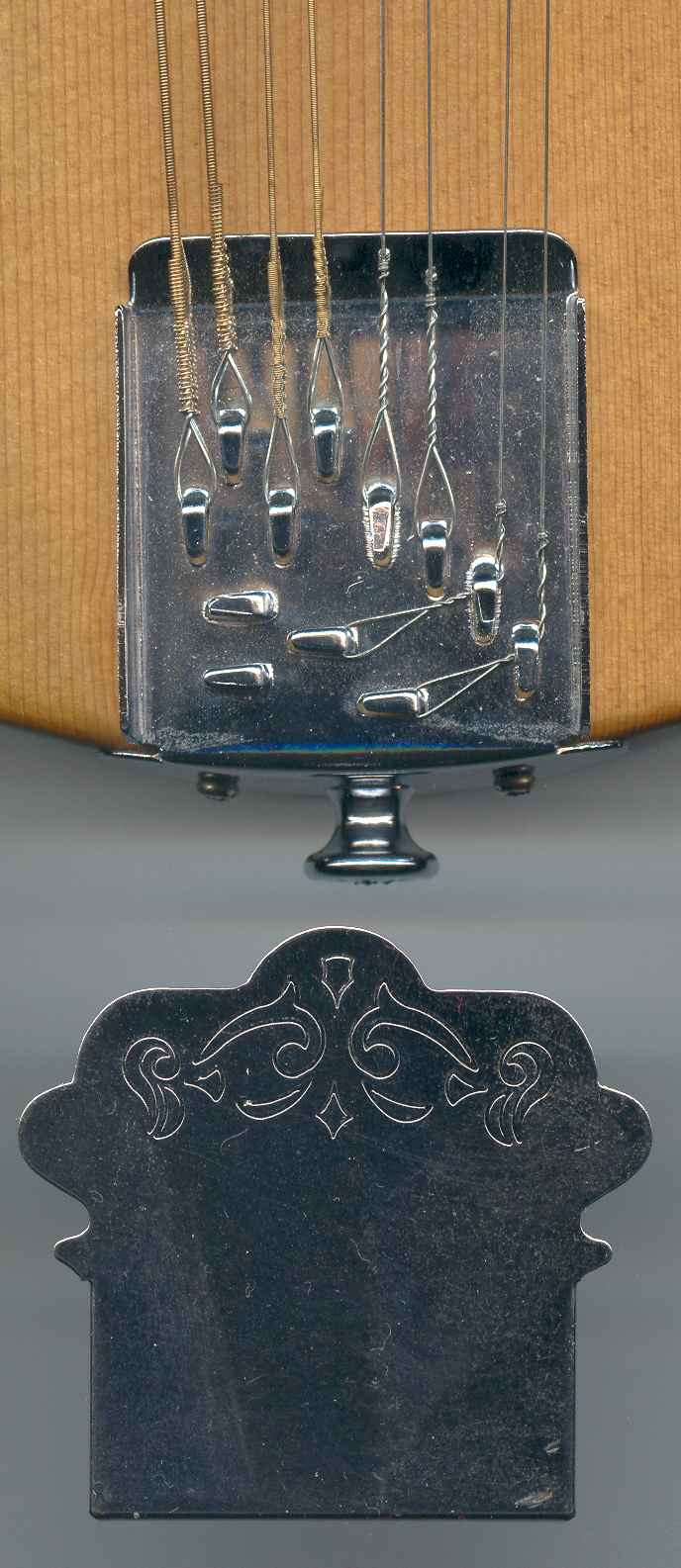
Mandolin tailpiece, which simply anchors the strings solidly

The tailpiece anchors the strings, so it must be strong enough to withstand their combined tension. Tailpieces of the violin family or viol families of instruments, including double basses, are attached by a "tailgut" looped around the tailpin or end button, which is let into the bottom bock of the instrument. Originally made of animal gut and adjusted with difficulty by means of a knot, tailguts are now usually made of wire or nylon monofilament, and easily adjusted with threaded collars, usually made of brass, on the ends.

Tailpieces are made of many materials. Violin tailpieces are typically made of wood: ebony, rosewood, boxwood, or rarely pernambuco. Other materials include cast light metal, and composites including plastic. Choice of material may have more than just cosmetic effect; a well-made instrument is sensitive to tailpiece weight, mass distribution, and tailgut placement on the saddle. Fretted string instrument tailpieces are typically made of metal.

Violin tailpieces come in various shapes. Some resemble a tulip or a goblet. The common Hill style has a central longitudinal ridge that gives it a faceted appearance. Some violin tailpieces feature decorative elements, as shell inlays or ornate stylized or figurative carvings.

Devices called "fine-tuners" are sometimes used to assist in the tuning of the instrument; they may either be affixed to the tailpiece or built into its design. Most modern violinists, regardless of what other strings they use, play an E with a solid steel core, which may be overly touchy to tune with the traditional tuning pegs. For convenience in tuning, the added mass of a single fine tuner is a tolerable trade-off. Four fine tuners are advantageous when tuning a set of metal-core strings.

Some electric guitar tailpieces feature a vibrato bar, which a player uses to alter the pitch of all strings at once for various musical effects.

== Setting up tailpieces ==
A well-set-up instrument from the violin family will have attention paid to the tuning of the afterlength, or string length on the tailpiece side of the bridge. On many instruments it is set to 1/6 the playing length, or length between nut and bridge, sounding two octaves and a fifth above the open note of the playing length. This tuning may be varied to give certain desired effects.

== See also ==
- Tailpiece (book illustration)
