= Violin (disambiguation) =

A violin is a bowed string instrument with four strings tuned in perfect fifths.

Violin may also refer to:

== Entertainment ==
- Violin (2011 film), a Malayalam film
- Violin (2017 film), a Russian film
- Violin (novel), novel by Anne Rice
- The Violin, a 2005 Mexican film

== Music ==
- Violin (album), album by violinist Vanessa-Mae
- "Violin", a children's song by They Might Be Giants on their album No!
- "Violin", a song by Kate Bush on her album Never for Ever
- "Violins", a song by Lagwagon on their album Hoss

=== Instruments ===
- Violin family, family of string based instruments developed in sixteenth century Italy
- Violin octet, family of string based instruments developed in twentieth century United States of America
- Bass violin, various bass instruments of the violin family
- Baritone violin, violin variant either one octave below convention or the third largest member of the violin octet family
- Baroque violin, violin whose design is based in the baroque period
- Electric violin, electrical variant of the standard violin
- Five string violin, five string variant of the violin
- Kit violin, small violin designed to fit in a pocket
- Nail violin, instrument categorised as a friction idiophone
- Stroh violin, violin that uses metal resonators or metal horns to amplify sounds
- Tenor violin, instrument with a range between a cello and a viola

== Other uses ==
- Violin beetle, species of ground beetles
- Violin Island or Pulau Biola, island off the coast of Singapore
- Violin Memory, US manufacturer of flash memory arrays
- Violin plot, in mathematics a box plot that illustrates probability density function
- VIOLIN vaccine database

== See also ==
- Fiddle, colloquial term for the instrument
- List of compositions for violin and orchestra
- List of violinists
