= Standard tuning =

Typical tuning of a string instrument

In music, standard tuning refers to the typical tuning of a string instrument. This notion is contrary to that of scordatura, i.e. an alternate tuning designated to modify either the timbre or technical capabilities of the desired instrument.

== Violin family ==
The most popular bowed strings used nowadays belong to the violin family; together with their respective standard tunings, they are:

- Violin – G_{3} D_{4} A_{4} E_{5} (ascending perfect fifths, starting from G below middle C)
- Viola – C_{3} G_{3} D_{4} A_{4} (a perfect fifth below a violin's standard tuning)
- Cello – C_{2} G_{2} D_{3} A_{3} (an octave lower than the viola)
- Double bass – E_{1} A_{1} D_{2} G_{2} (ascending perfect fourths, where the highest sounding open string coincides with the G on a cello).
- Double bass with a low C extension – C_{1} E_{1} A_{1} D_{2} G_{2} (the same, except for low C, which is a major third below the low E on a standard 4-string double bass)
- 5-stringed double bass – B_{0} E_{1} A_{1} D_{2} G_{2} (a low B is added, so the tuning remains in perfect fourths)

== Viol family ==
The double bass is properly the contrabass member of the viol family. Its smaller members are tuned in ascending fourths, with a major third in the middle, as follows:

- Treble viol – D_{3} G_{3} C_{4} E_{4} A_{4} D_{5} (ascending perfect fourths with the exception of a major third between strings 3 and 4)
- Tenor viol – G_{2} C_{3} F_{3} A_{3} D_{4} G_{4} (a perfect fifth below the treble viol)
- Bass viol – D_{2} G_{2} C_{3} E_{3} A_{3} D_{4} (an octave lower than the treble viol)
- 7-stringed bass viol – A_{1} D_{2} G_{2} C_{3} E_{3} A_{3} D_{4} (an extra low A is added)

A more recent family is the violin octet, which also features a standardized tuning system (see page).

== Guitar family ==
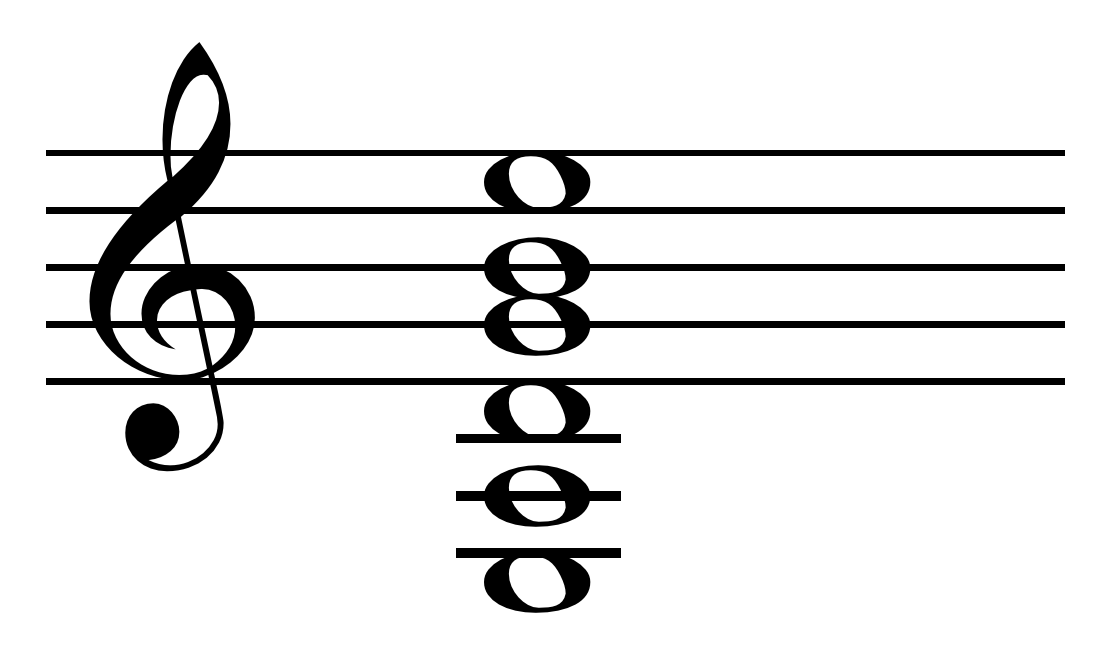
Guitar standard tuning (written an octave higher than it sounds).

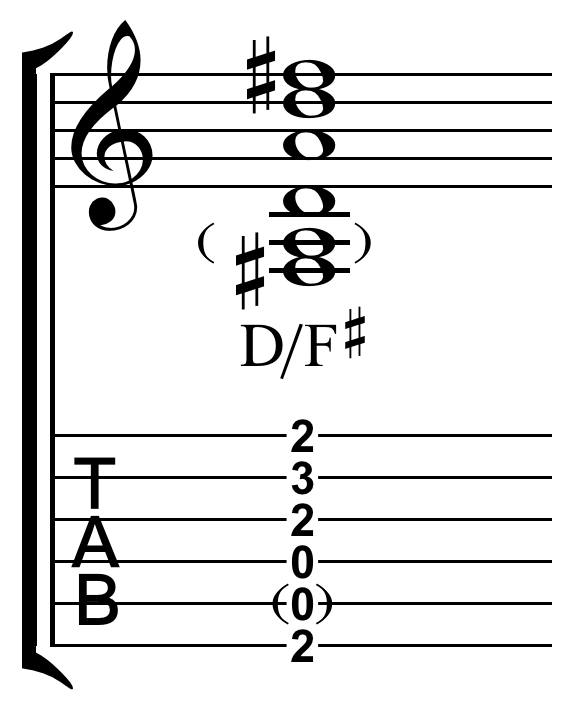
D/F♯ slash chord.

Guitars and bass guitars have more standard tunings, depending on the number of strings an instrument has.

- six-string guitar (the most common configuration) – E_{2} A_{2} D_{3} G_{3} B_{3} E_{4} (ascending perfect fourths, with an exception between G and B, which is a major third). Low E falls a major third above the C on a standard-tuned cello.
- Renaissance lute – E_{2} A_{2} D_{3} F♯_{3} B_{3} E_{4} (used by classical guitarists for certain pieces; identical to standard guitar tuning, except for the F♯, lowered one semitone from the standard G string, placing the major third between 3rd and 4th rather than 2nd and 3rd strings)
- seven-string guitar – B_{1} E_{2} A_{2} D_{3} G_{3} B_{3} E_{4} (identical, except for the low B, which is a perfect fourth below the low E on a 6-stringed guitar)
- four-string bass guitar (most popular) – E_{1} A_{1} D_{2} G_{2} (its standard tuning coincides with that of a 4-stringed double bass)
- five-string bass – B_{0} E_{1} A_{1} D_{2} G_{2} (identical to 4-stringed bass with the addition of a low B string a perfect fourth below the E).
- six-string bass – B_{0} E_{1} A_{1} D_{2} G_{2} C_{3} (identical to 5-stringed bass with the addition of a high C string a perfect fourth above the G).
- Baritone (older use) / 6 string bass (older use) such as the Fender Bass VI – E_{1} A_{1} D_{2} G_{2} B_{2} E_{3} (Similar to a standard guitar but an octave lower, and often played like a standard guitar rather than a bass guitar.)
- Baritone guitar (contemporary versions) – B_{1} E_{2} A_{2} D_{3} F♯_{3} B_{3} a fourth below standard tuning, although A_{1} to A_{3}; a fifth lower is also used.
- 12-string guitar E_{3} E_{2} A_{3} A_{2} D_{4} D_{3} G_{4} G_{3} B_{3} B_{3} E_{4} E_{4} in six two-string courses.

== Other ==
Other plucked string instruments and their respective standard tunings include:

- Banjo (Five-stringed): G_{4} D_{3} G_{3} B_{3} D_{4} for bluegrass; old time and folk banjoists use this and a wide variety of other tunings
- Mandola: C_{3} G_{3} D_{4} A_{4} (same as standard viola tuning)
- Mandolin: G_{3} D_{4} A_{4} E_{5} (same as standard violin tuning)
- Pipa: A_{2} D_{3} E_{3} A_{3} (most common and used in Chinese orchestra; several other tunings exist)
- Balalaika (Prima): E_{4} E_{4} A_{4} (the two identical Es are on strings of different gauges)
- Requinto Jarocho: A_{3} D_{3} G_{3} C_{4} (G string tuned the same as a guitar's)
- Ukulele (Soprano): G_{4} C_{4} E_{4} A_{4} (C_{6}) and A_{4} D_{4} F♯_{4} B_{4}

== See also ==
- List of guitar tunings
- Musical tuning
- Scordatura
