= Violetta (instrument) =

16th-century musical instrument similar to a violin

The violetta was a 16th-century musical instrument.

== String instruments under the name ==
It is believed to have been similar to a violin, but occasionally had only three strings, particularly before the 17th century. The term was later used as an umbrella for a variety of string instruments. Some of the instruments that fall under its umbrella are the viol, viola, viola bastarda, viola da braccio, viola d'amore, violetta marina, tromba marina and the viola da gamba, viola pomposa, violino piccolo, violoncello, and the violin.

Many of the instruments within this family contained anywhere from three to eight strings (also double sets of strings like a mandolin), either had frets or did not, was built with either very narrow ribs or wide ribs, and most distinctive of all (at least by modern standards) either did or did not contain sympathetic strings. Sympathetic strings (sometimes also referred to as resonating strings) are strings that sit below the regular strings and vibrate, or resonate, in sympathy with the strings above them as they’re played. According to The New Grove Dictionary of Musical Instruments, one of the earliest inceptions of the term came from G. M. Lanfranco, a lesser-known 16th century Italian composer, who uses the term “violetta” in one of his books, titled Scintille di musica, in 1533.
