= Bass violin =

Musical instrument

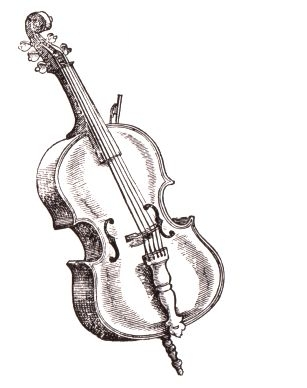
A woodcut of an early bass violin ("Bas-Geig de bracio") from Michael Praetorius' Syntagma musicum, 1619. This instrument is somewhat unusual in that it had five strings.

Bass violin is the modern term for various 16th- and 17th-century bass instruments of the violin (i.e. viola da braccio) family. They were the direct ancestor of the modern cello. Bass violins were usually somewhat larger than the modern cello, but tuned to the same nominal pitches or sometimes one step lower. Contemporaneous names for these instruments include "basso de viola da braccio," "basso da braccio," or the generic term "violone," which simply meant "large fiddle." The instrument differed from the violone of the viol, or "viola da gamba" family in that like the other violins it had at first three, and later usually four strings, as opposed to five, six, or seven strings, it was tuned in fifths, and it had no frets. With its F-holes and stylized C-bouts it also more closely resembled the viola da braccio.

The name "bass violin" is also sometimes used for the double bass.

Occasionally, historians have used the term "bass violin" to refer to other various instruments of the violin family that were larger than the alto violin or viola, such as the tenor violin. This use can be synonymous with "harmony violin."

After the 1950s, the term "bass violin" sometimes referred to a bass instrument of the violin octet.

== History and development ==
The bass violin was developed in Italy in the first half of the sixteenth century to play in consort with the violin and viola. The first builder was possibly Andrea Amati, as early as 1538. The first specific reference to the instrument was probably made by Jambe de Fer in his treatise Epitome Musical (1556). One of the first known instances of a composer explicitly calling for the bass violin ("basso da brazzo") was Monteverdi in Orfeo (1607) (the first was possibly Giovanni Gabrieli in Sacrae symphoniae, 1597).

The viol, or viola da gamba, was introduced to Italy from Spain around 1490. Before the introduction of the viol, no bowed instrument existed in the region. The viol da gamba was played in the a gamba position (i.e., between the legs like a cello, as opposed to under the chin like a violin). The viola da gamba was also much larger, and therefore could play much lower notes than other fiddles in Italy at that time. The first Italian viols (or "violoni" as they were often called) soon began to take on many characteristics of the precursors to the violin, such as separate tail pieces, and arched bridges that let the player sound one string at a time. (Though paintings like Jan Brueghel the Elder's "The Rustic Wedding" and Jambe de Fer in Epitome Musical suggest that the bass violin had alternate playing positions, these were short-lived and the more practical and ergonomic a gamba position eventually replaced them entirely.) One of the qualities that was almost certainly adopted by the Italian violin makers from the early Spanish viols was the C-bout, which they soon stylized. At some point in the early to mid-sixteenth century, an Italian maker (possibly Amati) set out to create a violone that was more closely matched, in appearance, tuning, and number of strings, to the new violin. Judging by artistic representations of the period, this may have been a somewhat gradual development. For example, there are depictions of instruments that appear to be bass violins (such as the one in Gaudenzio Ferrari's Glory of Angels, c. 1535), but that clearly show the presence of frets. Once the distinction became clear, and the form of the bass violin had crystallized, theorists and composers began to refer to the new instrument as the "basso da viola da braccio", or the first true bass violin.

Innovations in the design of the bass violin that ultimately resulted in the modern violoncello were made in northern Italy in the late 17th century. They involved a shift to a slightly smaller type and the higher tuning in C_{2}–G_{2}–D_{3}–A_{3} (although Michael Praetorius already had reported this tuning for the bass violin in his Syntagma Musicum (c. 1619)). It has been surmised that an early centre of these innovations lay in musical circles of Bologna, and that it was made possible by the invention of the new technique of composite strings of gut wound with metal. The new type found its ultimate consolidation and standardisation in works of the famous violin builder Antonio Stradivari around 1700. Luthiers cut many existing bass violins down in size to convert them into cellos. The new, smaller type was also linked to the new name of violoncello, a hypocoristic form of the older term violone, meaning literally "small violone" (i.e., ultimately, "small large viola"). The bass violin remained the "most used" instrument of the two in England as late as c.1740, where the violoncello was still uncommon.
