= Viola da braccio =

Baroque-era instruments of the violin family

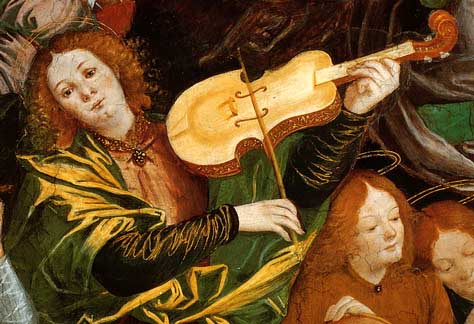
Viola da braccio in detail from a fresco by Gaudenzio Ferrari in Santa Maria dei Miracoli, Saronno (c. 1534–6)

Viola da braccio (from Italian "arm viola", plural viole da braccio) is a term variously applied during the baroque period to instruments of the violin family, in distinction to the viola da gamba ("leg viola") and the viol family to which the latter belongs. At first "da braccio" seems to encompass the entire violin family. Monteverdi's Orfeo (printed 1609) designates an entire six-part string section "viole da brazzo", apparently including bass instruments held between the knees like the cello and bass violin. His Selva morale (1641) contains a piece calling for "due violini & 3 viole da brazzo ouero 3 Tronboni" (2 violins & 3 viole da braccio or trombones), reflecting a general shift in meaning towards the lower instruments. Eventually it came to be reserved for the alto member, the viola. A famous example is Bach's Sixth Brandenburg Concerto (1721), combining two viole da braccio with two viole da gamba. The German word for viola, Bratsche, is a relic of this last use.

== Differences from viola da gamba ==
The families of the viola da braccio and the viola da gamba differ in size and form, the string tuning (viola da braccio in fifth tuning – viola da gamba in fourth tuning) as well as in the posture (viola da braccio = arm position, exception: bass-viola da braccio – viola da gamba = knee position) as well as in the bow position (viola da braccio = overbow grip – viola da gamba = underbow grip).

== History and development ==
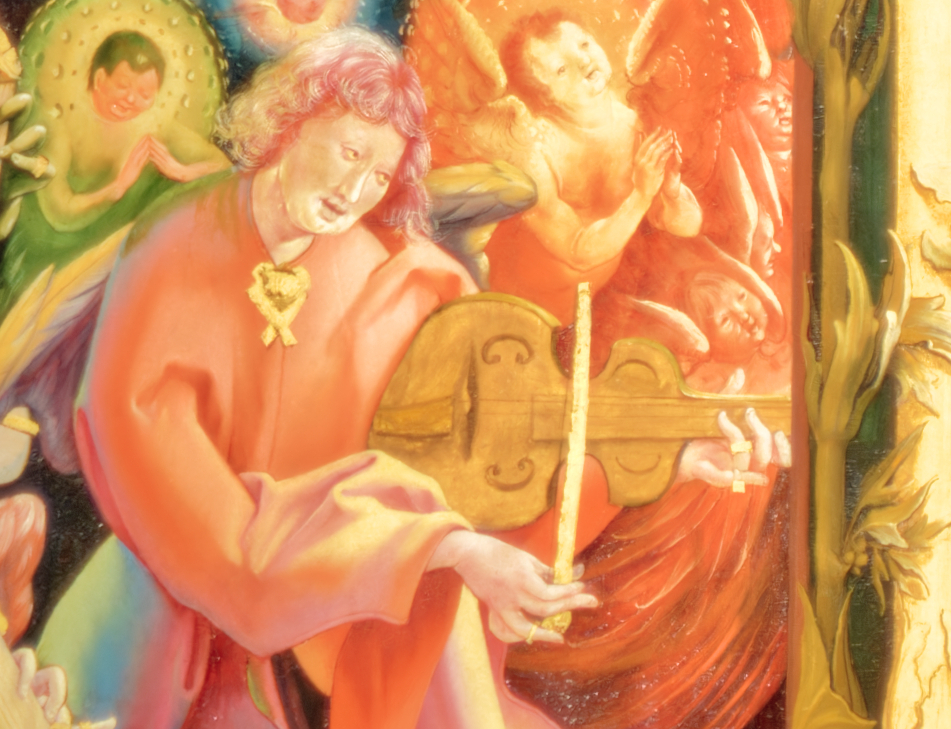
Viola da braccio in Matthias Grünewald's Isenheim Altarpiece painting

Over the centuries of history in the violin and viola da gamba families, there had been a constant development into the present form of the modern instruments known to us as violins, violas and cellos. The double bass, however, developed from both the violone and the bass-viola da gamba.

The first instruments of the viola da braccio family were built in Italy about 1530.

After an early form with three strings, a four-stringed version without string frets was developed with tuning in fifths. In this family, there were also different sizes and tunings, with different names based on pitch. There were soprano, alto, tenor and bass viola da braccio.

The alto viola da braccio's tuning is comparable to today's viola. The tuning for this alto viola da braccio was first recorded in the 16th century first (f-c'-g'-d") but was later tuned lower and is now the same tuning as modern violas. The tenor viola da braccio’s tuning was first tuned a minor third higher (B♭-f-c'-g') and later tuned lower (G-d-a-e') and is now comparable to tenor violin’s tuning. The soprano viola's tuning corresponded to today's violin, and the bass viola's tuning is the same as a modern-day cello's tuning.

== See also ==
- Fiddle
