= Carleen Hutchins =

American inventor

- Born: May 5, 1911; Springfield, Massachusetts, United States
- Died: August 7, 2009 (aged 98); Wolfeboro, New Hampshire, United States
- Education: Cornell University BA biology 1933
- Occupations: acoustician, violin-maker and researcher
- Organization(s): Acoustical Society of America, Catgut Acoustical Society

Carleen Maley Hutchins (May 24, 1911 – August 7, 2009) was an American high school science teacher, violin-maker and researcher, best known for her creation, in the 1950s/60s, of a family of eight proportionally sized violins now known as the violin octet (e.g., the vertical viola) and for a considerable body of research into the acoustics of violins. She was born in Springfield, Massachusetts and worked at her home in Montclair, New Jersey.

== Early life and education ==
Carleen Hutchins spent her childhood in New Jersey exploring the outdoors and her interests in entomology and woodworking; she was an active participant in her local Girl Scouts of the USA troop. In 6th grade, she took shop class instead of home economics and further developed her interest in wood-working during the 1920s. When she was 8 years old Hutchins learned to play the bugle and in high school she played trumpet in the band and the orchestra. She pursued her interest in entomology by obtaining a B.A. in biology from Cornell University in 1933. From 1931-1942, during the summers was an instructor at Camp Edith Macy, the National Girl Scout Leaders' Training School. Hutchins hoped to attend medical school to become a doctor, and went so far as being accepted by Duke University, however the expense of medical school and difficulty of being a woman in the medical field dissuaded her.

== Career ==
Hutchins taught science (and occasionally woodworking) in private elementary schools in New York City from 1934-1949. She left teaching to raise her family. Hutchins started to play viola in her free time and in 1947, frustrated by the sound of her instrument, she decided to build her own. In 1949 she completed her viola and showed it to Swiss luthier Karl A. Berger; over the next six years, Hutchins studied with Berger, building about 30 different instruments, mostly violas. During that same time period Hutchins also studied under Frederick A. Saunders, exploring the way the structure of instruments changed the acoustics by studying Chladni patterns. In 1962 she published her first article in the Scientific American "The Physics of Violins" and attended her first Acoustical Society of America meeting in 1963. The day after the close of the meeting, Hutchins co-founded the Catgut Acoustical Society, which develops scientific insights into the construction of new and conventional instruments of the violin family.

== Achievements ==
Hutchins’ greatest innovation, still used by many violin-makers, was a technique known as free-plate tuning. When not attached to a violin, the top and back are called free plates. Her technique gives makers a precise way to refine these plates before a violin is assembled.

From 2002 to 2003, Hutchins's octet was the subject of an exhibition at the Metropolitan Museum of Art in New York. Titled “The New Violin Family: Augmenting the String Section.” Hutchins was the founder of the New Violin Family Association, creator-in-chief of the Violin Octet, author of more than 100 technical publications, editor of two volumes of collected papers in violin acoustics, four grants from the Martha Baird Rockefeller Fund for Music, recipient of two Guggenheim Fellowships, an Honorary Fellowship from the Acoustical Society of America (ASA), and four honorary doctorates. In 1981, Hutchins also received the ASA Silver Medal in Musical Acoustics.

The Hutchins Consort, named after Hutchins, is a California ensemble featuring all eight instruments.

In 1974, Hutchins and Daniel W. Haines, using materials supplied by the Hercules Materials Company, Inc. (Allegany Ballistics Laboratory) of Cumberland, Maryland, developed a graphite-epoxy composite top that was determined to be a successful alternative to the traditional use of spruce for the violin belly.

== In popular culture ==
In Cormac McCarthy's novel Stella Maris, the main character, Alicia, talks about corresponding with Hutchins.
