= Violino piccolo =

Small stringed musical instrument

Violino piccolo (piccolo violin)
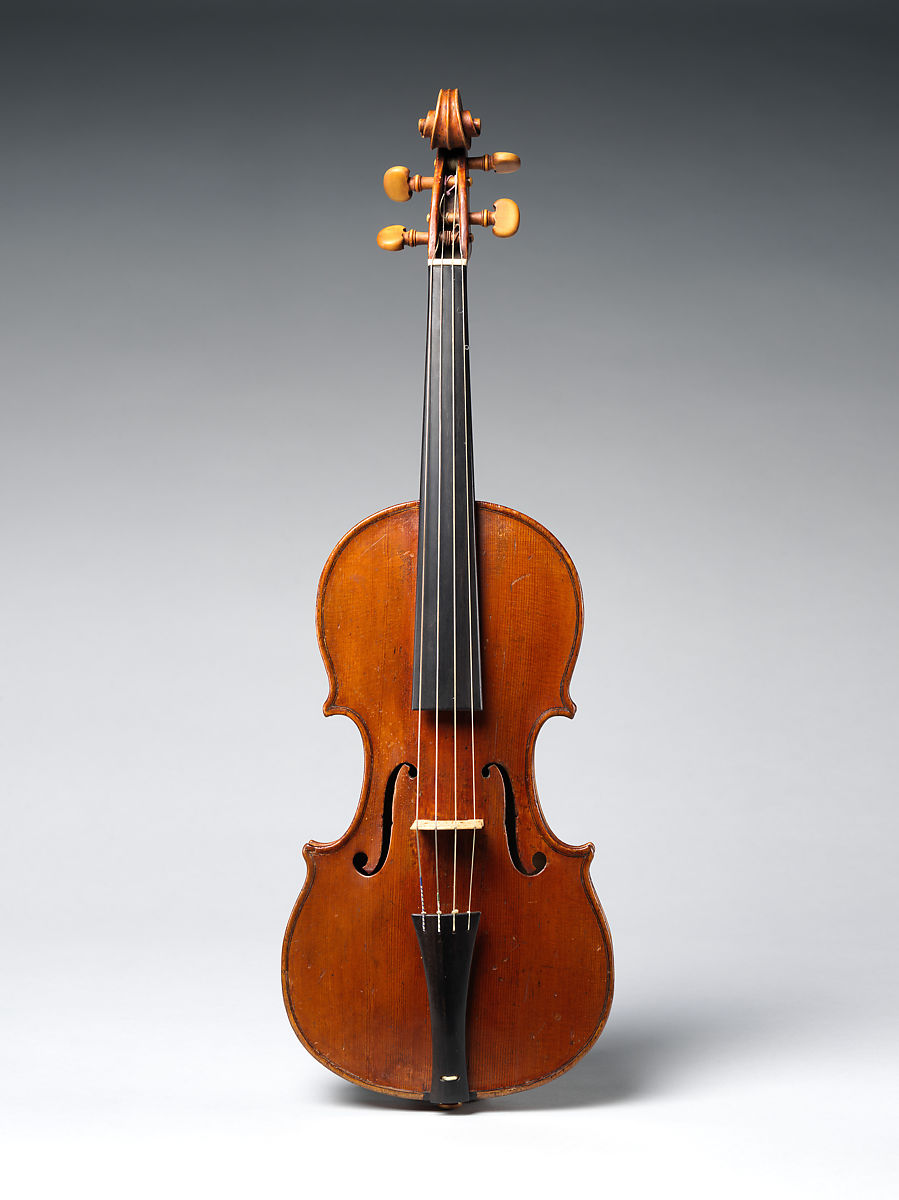
- Classification: Bowed string instruments

Related instruments
- Violin; Viola; Cello; Double bass

The violino piccolo (also called the Diskantgeige, Terzgeige, Quartgeige or Violino alla francese and sometimes in English as the Piccolo Violin) is a stringed instrument of the baroque period. Most examples are similar to a child's size violin in size, and are tuned a minor third (B♭_{3}–F_{4}–C_{5}–G_{5}) or a fourth higher (C_{4}–G_{4}–D_{5}–A_{5}). The most famous work featuring violino piccolo is the first Brandenburg Concerto of Johann Sebastian Bach.

The best-known violino piccolo is the Brothers Amati example in the National Music Museum in Vermillion, South Dakota. By modern measurements, the body is 1/4 size, the neck 1/2 size, and the head corresponds to that of a 3/4 size instrument. The string length is the equivalent of a 4/4 violin stopped a minor third from the nut, which corresponds with its normal tuning of a third higher than a 4/4 violin. It's notated in E flat. This Amati violin also has fingerboard widths similar to that of a 4/4 board cut a third shorter, which in view of the other measurements implies a clear conceptual relationship to the 4/4-sized violin.

When the construction of the violin changed as the rococo period began, it became possible to play many higher-pitched violin parts on a standard violin, and the piccolo violin was no longer considered necessary.

Violins of similar tuning have been built in modern times (specifically the soprano violin of the new violin family) but have not yet been accepted as standard.

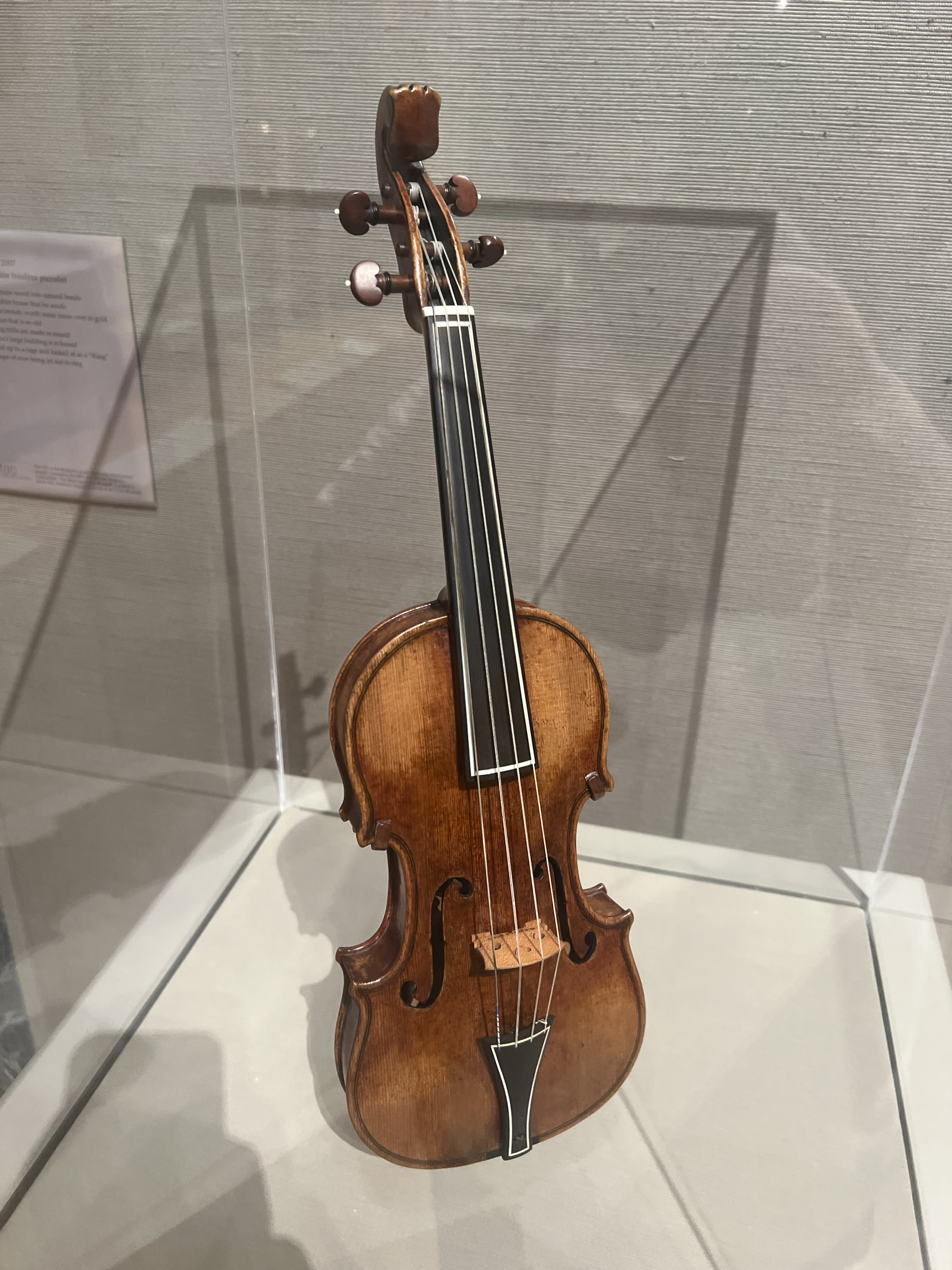
A Stradivarius violino piccolo at the Museum of Fine Arts, Boston.

== See also ==
- Rabeca chuleira, a short-scale Portuguese fiddle
- Pochette (musical instrument)
