= Vertical viola =

Musical Instrument

- Other names: Alto Violin
- Classification: Bowed string instruments

Related instruments
- Violin; Viola; Cello; Double bass

The vertical viola, alto violin or upright viola, is a stringed instrument with the range of a viola that is played vertically in the manner of a cello. It is the fourth-highest member of the violin octet (after the treble, soprano, and mezzo violins).

The standard viola is about as big as can conveniently be played under the chin. The physicist/instrument maker Carleen Hutchins, working during the 1960s, reasoned that a viola played vertically could be made larger, and that a larger viola might produce a better sound. Based on principles of instrument design she had observed in top-quality existing instruments, Hutchins designed a viola about 6 cm (2 1/2 in) longer than the regular viola, intended to be played vertically like a cello. (Despite Hutchins's original intention, a few violists have played her viola horizontally.)

The fundamental acoustic principle underlying the vertical viola is that the main body resonance (resonance of the wood of the instrument) should match the second-highest string, and the main cavity resonance (resonance of the air the instrument contains) should match the third-highest string. On a viola these strings are D and G, respectively. The standard viola is too small to achieve this matchup of string frequency to resonance frequency.

The same design principle was used by Hutchins to design a complete family of eight stringed instruments, commonly called the violin octet, of which the vertical viola has been the most successful. Since all of the instruments are designed based on the violin, Hutchins gave the name alto violin to her vertical viola design.

Hutchins's instrument has attracted admiration for its power and beauty of tone. The cellist Yo-Yo Ma has employed a Hutchins vertical viola to perform and record Béla Bartók's Viola Concerto.
