= VIOLIN vaccine database =

Vaccine database

The Vaccine Investigation and OnLine Information Network (VIOLIN) is the largest web-based vaccine database and analysis system. VIOLIN currently contains over 3,000 vaccines or vaccine candidates for over 190 pathogens. The vaccine information in the database is collected by manual curation from over 1,600 peer-reviewed papers. Different from most existing vaccine databases, VIOLIN focuses on vaccine research data. Different types of information is curated, including vaccine name, license status, antigens used, vaccine adjuvants, vaccine vectors, vaccination procedure, host immune response, challenge procedure, vaccine efficacy, adverse events, etc. All vaccine information in the VIOLIN vaccine database is supported by quoted references. The data generated by a curator is published only after a careful review and approval by a vaccine domain expert.

In addition, VIOLIN includes many vaccine analysis programs. For example, VIOLIN includes Vaxign (http://www.violinet.org/vaxign), the first web-based vaccine design program based on the strategy of reverse vaccinology. Vaxign has been tested in different pathogen models, including uropathogenic E. coli and Brucella spp.

VIOLIN also maintains the official web page for the development of community-based Vaccine Ontology (VO) (http://www.violinet.org/vaccineontology). VO is a formal biomedical ontology in the domain of vaccine and vaccination. VO is targeted for vaccine data standardization and integration, and supporting automated reasoning. VO has been shown to enhance vaccine literature mining.
