= Violone =

Several large, bowed musical instruments

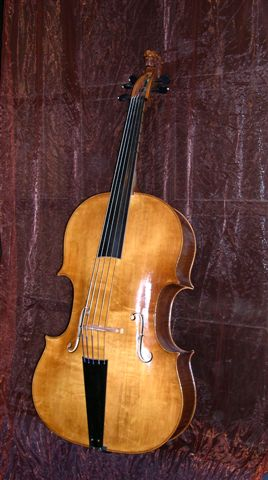
- Classification: Bowed string instrument

Related instruments
- Cello; Bass violin; Viol or viola da gamba; Double bass

Some early double basses were conversions of existing violones. This 1640 painting shows a bass violone being played.

The term violone (Italian pronunciation: [vi.oˈloːne, vjo-]; literally 'large viol', -one being the augmentative suffix) can refer to several distinct large, bowed musical instruments which belong to either the viol or violin family. The violone is sometimes a fretted instrument, and may have six, five, four, or even only three strings. The violone is also not always a contrabass instrument. In modern parlance, one usually tries to clarify the 'type' of violone by adding a qualifier based on the tuning (such as "G violone" or "D violone") or on geography (such as "Viennese violone"), or by using other terms that have a more precise connotation (such as "bass violin", "violoncello", or "bass viol"). The term violone may be used correctly to describe many different instruments, yet distinguishing among these types can be difficult, especially for those not familiar with the historical instruments of the viol and violin families and their respective variations in tuning.

== Usage ==
In modern usage, the term most often refers to the double bass viol, a bowed bass string instrument sounding its part an octave lower than notated pitch in early music groups performing Renaissance, Baroque and Classical era music on period instruments. However, the term can rightly be applied to members of the violin family, and also to ‘cello sized’ instruments, of both the violin and viol families, where those instruments play their parts at notated pitch. Only a few players specialize in these instruments, some of whom use contemporary reproductions rather than actual historical instruments.

== Types ==
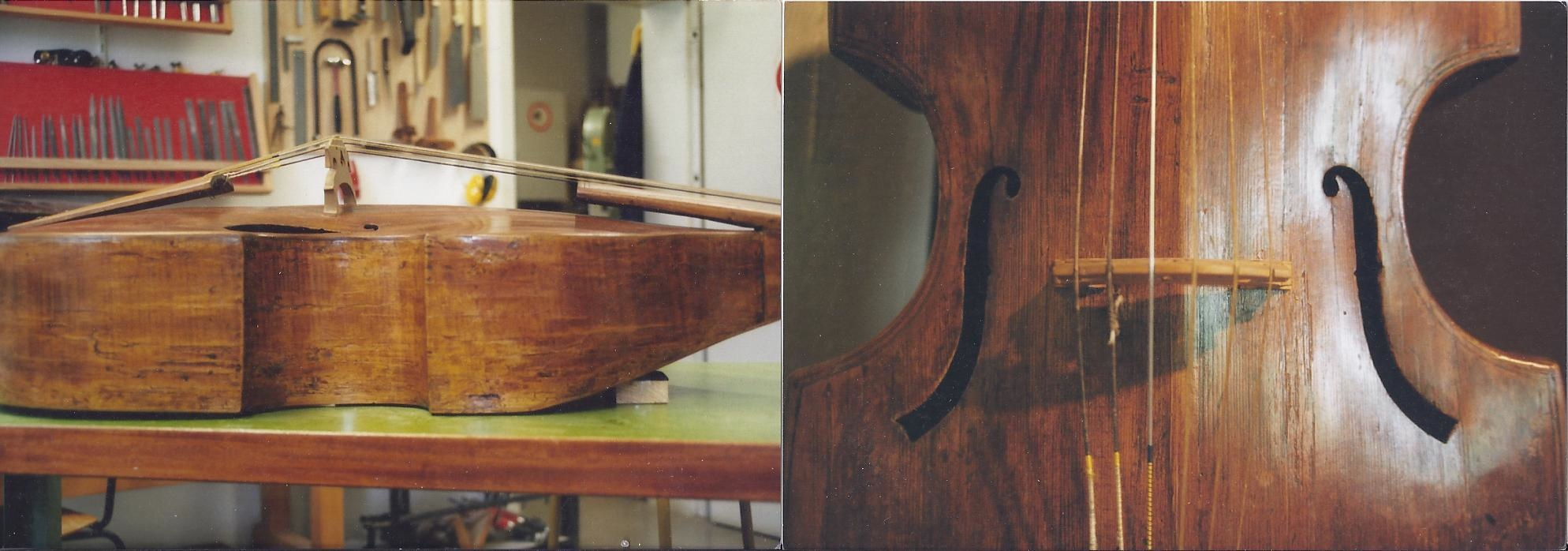
A "G violone" by Ernst Busch, in Berlin

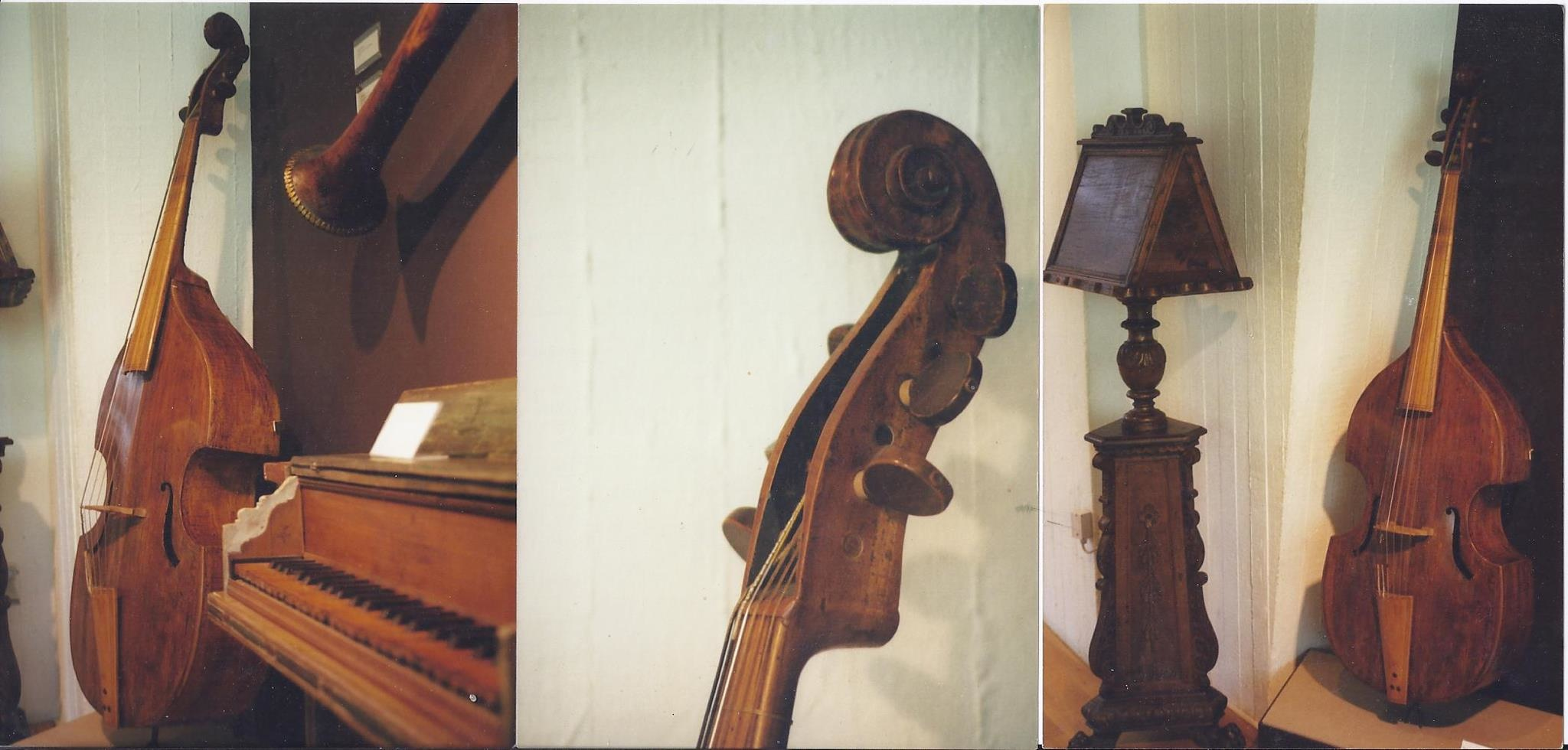
More shots of the "G violone" by Ernst Busch

There are several different instruments that have historically been called by the name "violone". Some of these can be loosely described as 'cello-sized' instruments, and play their parts sounding at the notated pitch. Other types of violone are larger-bodied than the cello (sometimes as large or even larger than modern double basses) – most of those sound their parts an octave below notated pitch, but certain types are flexible about which octave they play in, and sometimes switch back and forth. Ultimately, however, it is not the family or size of the instrument that determines the type, but rather the tuning that is utilized, which generally makes it possible to classify the instrument as a member of either the viol or violin family. During the Renaissance music and Baroque music eras, most players and composers were not precise in describing the specific type of violone they had in mind when that name was written on the page. Some ensemble works do not even indicate which instruments should play the different parts, leaving it up to ensemble leaders to choose the instruments. This contrasts sharply with the standardization of instrumentation which developed during the Classical music period; for example, during this period, a string quartet, with only a few exceptions, is intended to be performed by two violins, a viola and a cello.

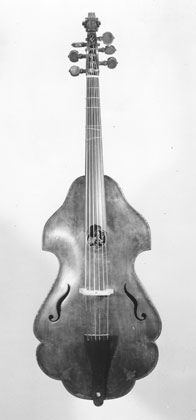
Six-string "G violone" or "A violone" c. 1630 by Ernst Busch, in Stockholm

In the 2000s, musicologists and historians acknowledge the importance of distinguishing specifically which instrument a composer intended, or if the composer allowed the ensemble leader to choose the instruments for each part. Assigning specific names and classifying violoni as different types, as we are doing here, is a modern attempt to clarify things. Loosely described, bowed string instruments are made in families so that different sized members can play in different ranges, with treble instruments corresponding to the soprano and bass instruments corresponding to the lowest vocal range (or even lower, down to the "contrabass" register). Members of the violin family are the easiest to identify in this way: with the violin corresponding to the soprano, the viola to the alto, violoncello to the tenor, and bass to the bass ranges of the human voice (historically, the violin family was made in more than just these four sizes: there were originally several sizes of violas, as well as instruments smaller than the modern violin, for example). The viol family also comprises instruments in a multitude of sizes. In North America in the 21st century, they are classified as 'treble' viols (soprano range), 'tenor' viols (alto range), 'bass' viols (tenor range), and 'great bass' viols, 'violoni' and violones (bass range).

When we refer to the historical term 'violone', we must include almost all the instruments of both the violin and viol families (plus some hybrid instruments) that functioned as either tenor or bass members of those families. As the name 'violone' really means (see below), truly, these are all large string instruments. It was not until the 20th century that players and scholars started to realize that there were so many types of violoni and that not all of them functioned or sounded like double basses. Because of this, the classification of violoni according to tuning, family, and function makes it start to be possible to clarify composers' intentions at different times and places. The most important thing to remember is that different types of violoni sound (and often function) quite differently from each other.

=== Cello-sized instruments ===
Cello-sized instruments are typically the 'tenor' members of the viol or violin families, though in fact their upper compass allows them to play in the alto (and even soprano) range, and their lower compass may enable them to play in the bass (and even contra-bass) range. There are 3 types of instruments in this category:

- The bass viol. This is a 6-string member of the viol family, most often tuned in D. Instruments from the later Baroque may have a seventh string tuned to A_{1}.
- The bass violin or basse de violon. This was usually a 4-string member of the violin family, often slightly larger-bodied and a bit lower in pitch than the cello, and often tuned with each string a whole step lower than the cello: (lowest to highest) B♭_{1}–F_{2}–C_{3}–G_{3}.
- The violoncello or "cello". This one is still used in the 21st century, and is also known as the cello, found in modern symphony orchestras. It has four strings, tuned (lowest to highest) C_{2}–G_{2}–D_{3}–A_{3}.

=== Larger instruments ===
- The great bass viol, also sometimes called the G violone or the A violone. This is the next largest viol after the bass viol, usually with 6 strings, and it can be tuned in A or G. It can play lines at either 8′ or 16′ pitch, and there is a tremendous amount of music for it as a solo and chamber instrument (at 8′), as the bass member of the viol consort (at 8′), playing basso continuo basslines (usually at 8′) and functioning as a double bass instrument in large ensembles (at 16′), playing the deepest fundamental bass pitches in the music.

=== Double bass-sized instruments ===
There are a number of instruments in this category, but not all so easy to differentiate by name. One is a true member of the viol family, and the others have much in common with the violin, but can't necessarily be described as genuine violin family instruments because their tunings, proportions and/or construction issues may be at odds with the other sizes.

- D violone. This is the largest member of the viol family, with six strings, tuned in D, a full octave lower than the bass viol.
- The Viennese violone was a hybrid instrument because it has many features of the viol family (frets, gamba shape, flat back), but as a four- or five-string instrument with a D major tuning in thirds and fourths (F_{1}–A_{1}–D_{2}–F♯_{2}–A_{2}); four-string instruments omit the bottom string. Due to this feature, it does not have a true viol tuning. If a fifth string was present, its tuning could be variable, potentially going as low as D_{1}. It played almost exclusively at 16′, though it was used commonly as a chamber and solo instrument (even from the 17th century) and was the preferred double bass instrument in the Viennese Classical period (c. 1760–1820). Some concertos for the bass, e.g., by Wanhal and Dittersdorf, were composed with this tuning in mind.

Alfonso Ferrabosco the Elder (1543-1588) - Fantasia 'Di Sei Bassi’ from the Sambrook Manuscript, New York. NYp, Drexel 4302, p.255, no.45 (ca.1613-19)

Orlando Gibbons (bap.1583-1625) - Fantasia à4, VdGS No.1GB, Oxford. Christ Church, Mss.732-35 (ca.1630)

Orlando Gibbons (bap.1583-1625) - Galliard à3, Dublin. Marsh's Library, IRL-Dm Mss.z.3.4.1-3 (ca.1650)

Orlando Gibbons (bap.1583-1625) - Fantasia à3 in d, VdGS No.3GB, Oxford. Christ Church, Mss.732-35 (ca.1630)
Performed by Phillip W. Serna, Viols & Violones

- Contrabass or double bass. These terms are again problematic from a historical perspective (often meaning something slightly different from a modern reader might expect), but here refer to three- or four-string instruments that (usually) do not have frets—of all the types of violoni, these are the ones that most closely resemble modern double basses. The strings may be tuned in fourths (E_{1}–A_{1}–D_{2}–G_{2} like most modern double basses) or in fifths (C_{1}–G_{1}–D_{2}–A_{2} a full octave lower than the cello), and if there are only 3 strings, the missing string is almost always the lowest one (i.e. A_{1}–D_{2}–G_{2} or G_{1}–D_{2}–A_{2}). In the 18th and 19th century, many bassists used only three strings, as it was thought that removing a string made the instrument more sonorous and resonant. It may also be tuned in fifths (C_{1}–G_{1}–D_{2} or G_{1}–D_{2}–A_{2}).

=== Other types ===
In the Renaissance and Baroque era and even in the 2000s, there are players who changed or adapted their instruments in unique ways, for example Ganassi's Regola Rubertina (1542–43). In this category we might find bass viols that are tuned in E (E_{2}-A_{2}-D_{3}-F♯_{3}-B_{3}-E_{4}) (instead of D), or where the bottom string is tuned an extra step lower, to a C_{2} (a pitch found in numerous Baroque works). We might find tenor viols that are tuned in F (F_{2}-B♭_{2}-E♭_{3}-G_{3}-C_{4}-F_{4}) (instead of G) (called baritone viols). We might find treble viols that are tuned in B♭ (B♭_{2}-E♭_{3}-A♭_{3}-C_{4}-F_{4}-B♭_{4}) (instead of D) (called contralto viols). Or we might find a contrabass/double bass tuned in fourths, but with a top string a fourth higher than is standard (A_{1}–D_{2}–G_{2}–C_{3}) or another contrabass/double bass tuned in fourths but with its bottom string tuned down to a low C.

Looking only at modern Viol de Gamba based instruments, there are five.

Bass-Range Viol tuning
Instrument	Strings (low to high)							
Instrument	7	6	5	4	3	2	1	Harmonic Relation (low-to-high)
Baritone		F_{2}	B♭_{2}	D_{3}	G_{3}	C_{4}	F_{4}	4th, Maj3rd, 4th, 4th, 4th
Bass	A_{1} (Note: The baroque bass viol has either six or seven strings.)	D_{2}	G_{2}	C_{3}	E_{3}	A_{3}	D_{4}	(4th), 4th, 4th, Maj3rd, 4th, 4th
Violone in A		A_{1}	D_{2}	G_{2}	B_{2}	E_{3}	A_{3}	4th, 4th, Maj3rd, 4th, 4th
Violone in G		G_{1}	C_{2}	F_{2}	A_{2}	D_{3}	G_{3}	4th, 4th, Maj3rd, 4th, 4th
Violone in D		D_{1}	G_{1}	C_{2}	E_{2}	A_{2}	D_{3}	4th, 4th, Maj3rd, 4th, 4th

== History ==
A violone or "great bass viol"; painting by Sir Peter Lely, Dutch-born English Baroque era painter, c. 1640, showing a large bass instrument of da braccio corpus form, but with a very wide fingerboard, played with underhand bow grip, and without an endpin

Both the violin and viol families came into use in the Western world at approximately the same time (c. 1480) and co-existed for many centuries. That being said, during the Renaissance and early Baroque eras, the two families had different uses, and in particular, different social standings. Viols were primarily household instruments, played by well-to-do, educated members of society, as a pleasant and cultured way of passing time. In contrast, violin family instruments were primarily used for social functions, performed on by professional players. During this 'early' period, the largest member of the violin family in common use was a cello-sized instrument, but quite often tuned a whole step lower than the modern cello (B♭_{1}–F_{2}–C_{3}–G_{3}). This is not to say that there were no larger sized violoni described in the violin family at that time, it's just that descriptions of those larger basses are fewer, and there are many different tunings possible. Also, at this early period, there was minimal need for an instrument that would function at 16′ doubling an 8′ bass line. Human-sized members of the violin family were at first used primarily for dramatic effect in operas (and other dramatic works), and later for similar dramatic effect in concerto grosso type 'orchestral' settings.

In contrast, large members of the viol family were much more common, and used from earliest times, playing their lines at 8′ pitch. There is much evidence to show that Renaissance viol consorts were made of many large-bodied instruments. Great bass viols (with both A and G tunings) are described in numerous treatises, and there is a lot of solo and chamber music that necessitates their use because of its low compass. Some of this music is extremely virtuosic in nature (the viola bastarda pieces by Vincenzo Bonizzi, for example, exploit a 3 1/2 octave range). It's also clear that both women and men played instruments of this size – the preface to Bonizzi's 1626 collection is dedicated to the three daughters of his Ferrarese patron, for example, and there are also numerous paintings that depict women playing very large viol family instruments.

A technological advance occurred in the 1660s, centred in Bologna. This was the invention of wound ("overspun" or "overwound") strings. For bass instruments, this was important, because it meant one could now obtain good sounding low strings (that were not thick and rope-like in diameter) without having an excessively long string length. This was also when the term "violoncello" came into use, and the 'standard' cello tuning (C_{2}–G_{2}–D_{3}–A_{3}) became the norm. As well, a solo repertoire for the 'cello started to appear, and the 'cello started to replace the G violone or A violone as the preferred bowed basso continuo instrument (see articles by Stephen Bonta for more detailed information). These advances for the 'cello were likely the first seeds of decline for the G violone/A violone. However, it was also this time period that saw the growth of instrumental ensembles, and the beginning of a taste for 'concerti' and 'symphonies.'

For players and musical communities that had previously favoured G violoni/A violoni as their main bowed basses, once the cello took over the 8' role, the larger bodied G violini/A violoni could be used as 16′ doubling instruments, playing an octave below the cello-sized instruments. It is also from this time period (early 18th century) that most of the D violone tuning descriptions are documented. By this point, most of the other sized members of the viol family had died out (with the exception of the bass viol, which was cherished as a solo and chamber instrument). The largest members of the viol family (G and D violoni) were used in some regions even when other places had started to replace them with three- and four-string contrabasses/double basses. This may explain why the modern double bass to this day is so varied, and lacks a standard form, tuning or playing style. Professional bassists in orchestras have basses with flat backs, curved backs, sloping "shoulders" or rounded shoulders, and tunings including E_{1}–A_{1}–D_{2}–G_{2} and less commonly "C_{1}–G_{1}–D_{2}–A_{2}. The modern double bass combines features of both the viol and violin families.

== Terminology ==
When use of the word "violone" began in the early sixteenth century, "viola" simply meant a bowed, stringed instrument, and did not specify viol or violin. Historically "violone" has referred to any number of large fiddles, regardless of family. The term violone is sometimes used to refer to the modern double bass, but most often nowadays implies a period instrument. As a period instrument, it can refer to any of the different types that are described, above. "Violone" is also the name given to a non-imitative string-tone pipe organ stop, constructed of either metal or wood, and found in the pedal division at 16′ pitch (one octave below written pitch), or, more rarely, 32′ (2 octaves below written pitch).
