= Violin octet =

String instrument family

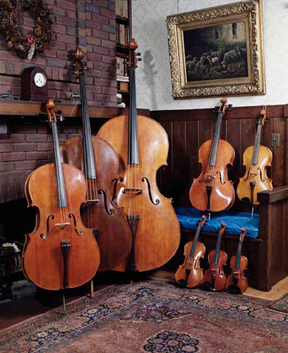
- From left to right: Baritone violin; Small bass violin; Contrabass violin; Tenor violin; Alto violin; Mezzo violin; Soprano violin; Treble violin
- Other names: The New Violin Family
- Classification: Bowed string instruments

Related instruments
- Violin; Viola; Cello; Double bass

The violin octet is a family of stringed instruments developed in the 20th century primarily under the direction of the American luthier Carleen Hutchins. Each instrument is based directly on the traditional violin and shares its acoustical properties, with the goal of a richer and more homogeneous sound. Unlike the standard modern stringed instruments, the main resonance of the body of the violin octet instrument is at a pitch near the two middle open strings, giving the instruments a more balanced, clearer sound.

The instruments were proposed by composer Henry Brant in 1957 and the first octet was completed in 1967.

== Instruments ==
The instruments of the violin octet are:

Instrument	Range	Tuning	Notes
Treble violin		G_{4}–D_{5}–A_{5}–E_{6}, tuned an octave above the violin, like the Kit violin or pochette or the two "kleine Poschen" of the Syntagma Musicum of Michael Praetorius	About the size of a 1/4 violin
Soprano violin		C_{4}–G_{4}–D_{5}–A_{5}, tuned a fourth above the violin, like the violino piccolo	About the size of a 3/4 violin
Mezzo violin		G_{3}–D_{4}–A_{4}–E_{5}, tuned the same as the violin	The body is slightly longer (368–381 mm; 14.5–15.0 in) than a conventional violin (355 mm; 14.0 in) but the strings are about the same length (328–338 mm; 12.9–13.3 in)
Alto violin		C_{3}–G_{3}–D_{4}–A_{4}, tuned the same as the viola	Similar to a viola but larger, and is often played upright, like a cello
Tenor violin		G_{2}–D_{3}–A_{3}–E_{4}, tuned an octave below a standard violin, like the historical tenor violin	The body is similar to a 1/2 cello but with thinner ribs and a longer neck
Baritone violin		C_{2}–G_{2}–D_{3}–A_{3}, tuned the same as a cello	Larger than a conventional cello
Small bass violin		A_{1}–D_{2}–G_{2}–C_{3}, tuned a fourth above a double bass or G_{1}–D_{2}–A_{2}–E_{3}, tuned a fourth below a cello.	About the size of a 5/8 double bass; played like a double-bass or sitting down (like a cello)
Contrabass violin		E_{1}–A_{1}–D_{2}–G_{2}, tuned the same as a double bass or C_{1}–G_{1}–D_{2}–A_{2}, tuned an octave below a cello.	Larger than a conventional double bass; played like a double bass

Note: While the Small Bass and Contrabass violins were designed and originally meant to be tuned in fifths, most bassists find the required extra shifting impractical. The former New Violin Family Association listed tunings for these instruments in fourths, while the Hutchins Quartet retains the original fifths tuning.

== Bows ==
Carleen Hutchins did not design specific bows for the instruments of the violin octet. This is important research which still has not been completed. Players of these instruments use a variety of violin, viola, cello and double-bass bows, looking for the best fit they can at the moment.

== Performing groups ==
Currently, there are three performing groups which play and record on the instruments of the violin octet. The Hutchins Consort (based in San Diego, California) plays on Carleen Hutchins' instruments. The Hutchins Consort Quartet is a subset of the consort and plays on soprano violin, tenor violin, baritone violin and contrabass violin. The Albert Consort (based in Ithaca, New York) uses a set of instruments made by Robert Spear and the New Violin Family Orchestra, organized by the association Octavivo, which also uses instruments made by Robert Spear.

== Use in traditional roles ==
The instruments of the violin octet do not necessarily have to be used in the context of the consort and for playing music written especially for them. They can also be used as alternatives to members of the usual violin family: for example any string quartet could be played by an ensemble consisting of two mezzo violins, one alto violin and one baritone violin, as an alternative to the two violins, viola and cello of the usual string quartet.

The best-known use of a member of the New Violin Family in this sort of role is that of an alto violin by Yo-Yo Ma to perform and record Béla Bartók's Viola Concerto.
