= Baritone violin =

Musical Instrument

- Classification: Bowed string instruments

Playing range
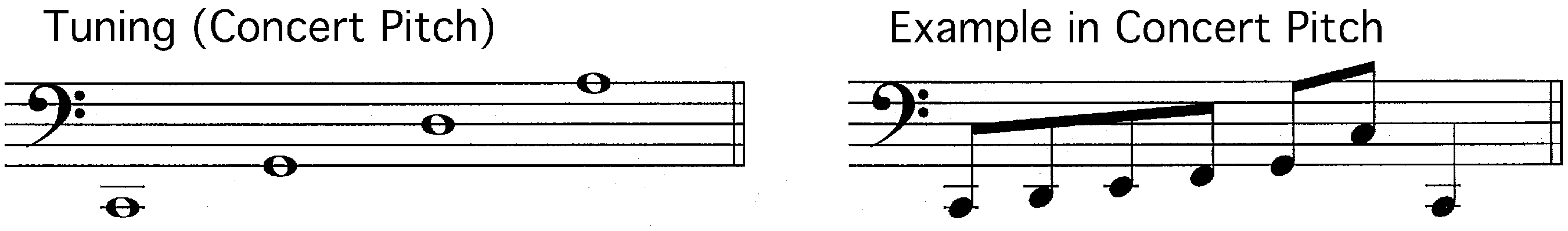

Related instruments
- Violin; Viola; Cello; Double bass

A Baritone violin is a member of the violin family and has two specific meanings:

- a violin tuned an octave below conventional violin tuning (G_{2}–D_{3}–A_{3}–E_{4}). This is commonly accomplished by stringing a standard violin with heavy gauge strings, sometimes specially manufactured for this purpose. Oversize instruments with the same range and tuning also exist and are known as tenor violins.
- the third largest member of the violin octet family of instruments, with the same tuning as a cello (C_{2}–G_{2}–D_{3}–A_{3}) but larger in size.

The most commonly available strings for converting a standard violin to the baritone range are manufactured by Thomastik under the brand "Octavgeige." Performers on the baritone violin commonly use amplification to overcome the limited projection and sonority inherent with a lower range on a relatively small bodied instrument. In modern playing, it is more common to find the baritone violin in a jazz, newgrass, or experimental ensemble than in a classical setting. Some well known performers on the baritone violin include Jean-Luc Ponty, Svend Asmussen, and Darol Anger.
