= Pochette (musical instrument) =

Small bowed string instrument

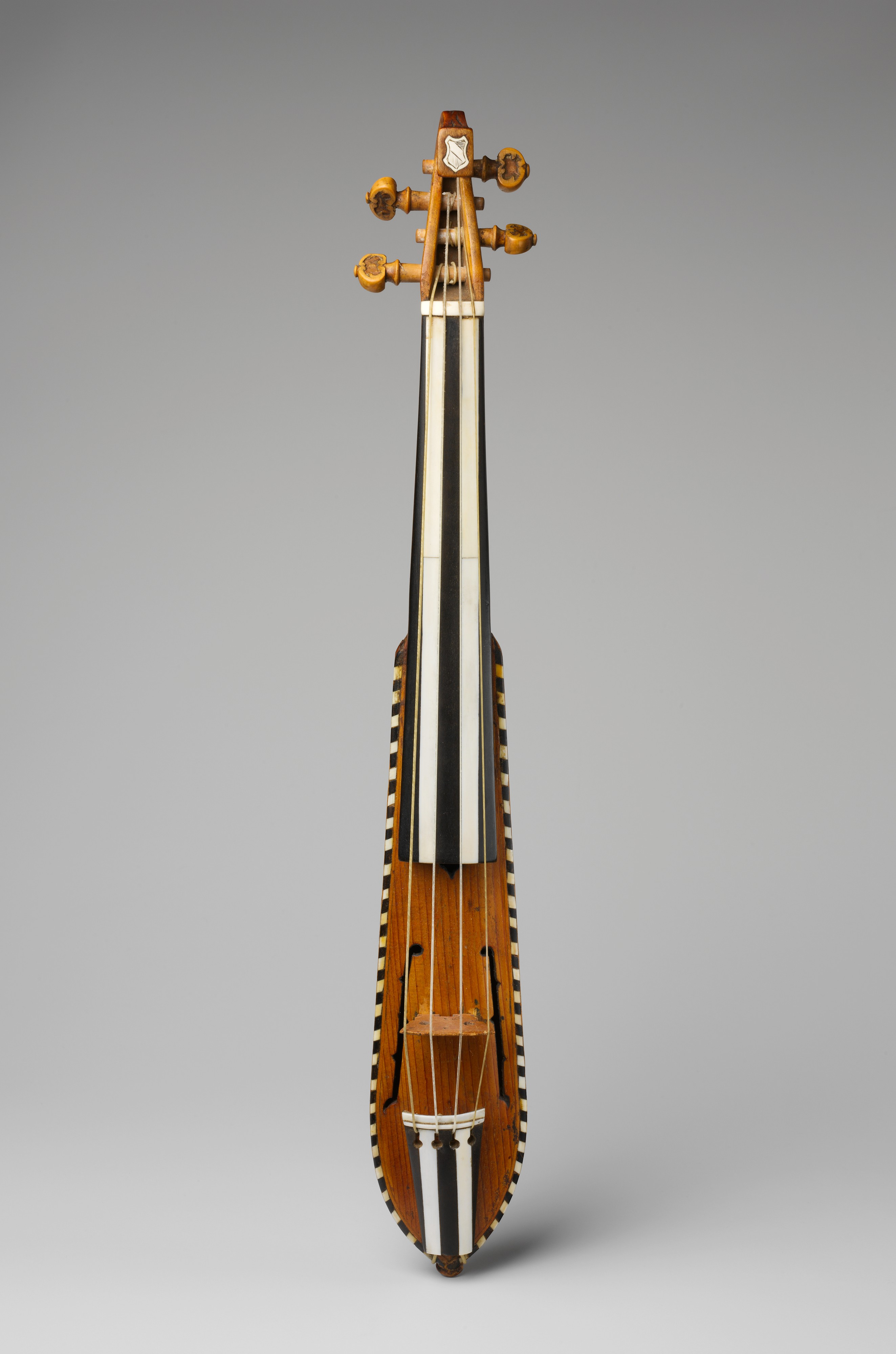
- Decorated pochette
- Other names: Kytte, treble violin; creytertjes; poche, kit violin, dancing master's kit, pochette d’amour, sourdine; Posch, Tanzmeistergeige, Taschengeige, Trögl-geige; canino, pochetto, sordina, sordino; linterculus; Kemençe (Turkish: küçük keman, small violin)
- Classification: Bowed string instrument

Related instruments
- Violin; Viola; Cello; Double bass; Kemenche; Rebec

Traditional Welsh fiddle tune ("Y Crythor Llon") played on a pochette

The pochette is a small stringed instrument of the bowed variety. It is a small violin-like instrument designed to fit in a pocket, hence the name "pochette" (French for small pocket).

Also known as a pocket fiddle, it was designed to be used by dance masters in royal courts and noble households, and by street musicians, from about the 15th century until around the 19th century, becoming especially popular in the 1800s. Prior, the rebec was used in a similar way, and some modern pochettes descend from the rebec instead of the violin family.

A common misconception is that pochettes were intended for children, when in fact they were conceived for adults; their small size allowed them to be used where the larger violins were too cumbersome to carry, or too expensive to own. The instrument's body is very small, but its fingerboard is long relative to the instrument's overall size, to preserve as much of the instrument's melodic range as possible. Pochettes come in many shapes, with the narrow boat-shaped ones called "sardinos" being one of the most common, along with the pear-shaped type. A pochette shaped like a violin is called a "kit violin" or just "kit".

== Etymology ==
In his Traité des instruments de musique, Trichet is said to have described the pochette's leather carrying case as a poche. Similarly, Mersenne wrote that it was common practice among pochette players (such as traveling minstrels or dance teachers) to carry the instrument in a pocket. The word "kit" possibly arose from an abbreviation of the word "pocket" to "-cket" and subsequently "kit"; alternatively, it may be a corruption of "cittern" (Greek: κιθάρα). The word "Kit" is believed to have first been used in the first quarter of the 16th century England where it was mentioned in Interlude of the Four Elements by John Rastell, c. 1517. It is possible that the word "kit" originally referred to a small rebec, which was used in the same manner at the time in England, but came to belong to the violin-shaped pochettes later on as it replaced the rebec.

== History ==
Many fiddlers in the 18th century used pochettes because of their portability. The pochette or pocket fiddle was used by dance masters not only during dances, but when teaching as well.

The great luthier Antonio Stradivari is known to have made a few pochettes in his career; two are known to have survived to modern times, one possibly in bad shape, and the other on display at the Conservatoire de Paris Museum.

== Sound ==
The pochette tends to be tuned one octave above a violin. The three-string variant specifically tends to be tuned the highest. Michael Praetorius declared in volume 2 of his Syntagma Musicum that the "small discant violin" is tuned c-g-d-a and the "very small, three-string violin", which he called Pochetto, is tuned a-e-b or g-d-a.

Claudio Monteverdi used the "chirp" sound of the pochette to suggest bird song in his aria "Ecco pur ch'a voi ritorno" from the 1607 opera L'Orfeo. In the opera they are called violini piccoli alla francese ("small French violins").

The Fellowship of Makers and Restorers of Historical Instruments has expressed that even with a sound post a violin cannot imitate the sound of a pochette enough for the two to be considered the same.

== Notable players ==
- Niel Gow is known to have played a pochette, and reportedly carried one in his pocket whenever he walked from his house in Inver to Blair Castle, where he worked.
- Thomas Jefferson owned at least two pochettes.

== Design ==
Due to being an essential feature of court entertainment and dance, pochettes were often made of expensive materials such as exotic woods, tortoise shells or ivory, as well as being decorated with elaborate carvings.

A pochette shaped like a boat is called a sardino (or Tanzmeistergeige in Germany), while a violin-shaped one is called a kit.

In general pochettes have a narrower body and longer neck in overall relation to its size compared to other bowed string instruments. They often lack frets and have either four or three strings. They also often have a distinctly vaulted and arched back. A pochette is distinguishable from the rest of the violin family due to the fact that the neck is a prolongation of the body, instead of simply being attached to it.

The Fellowship of Makers and Restorers of Historical Instruments has expressed that a pochette's strings ought not to be longer than ten inches (25 cm).

== Playing ==
Due to their small size, pochettes cannot be played resting on the chin or shoulder like a violin, and are instead pressed against the chest or along the upper arm, being played with a short bow.

== Gallery ==
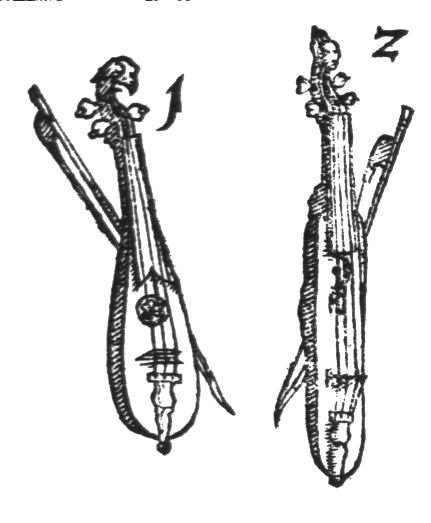
A rebec and a "boat shaped" sardino pochette

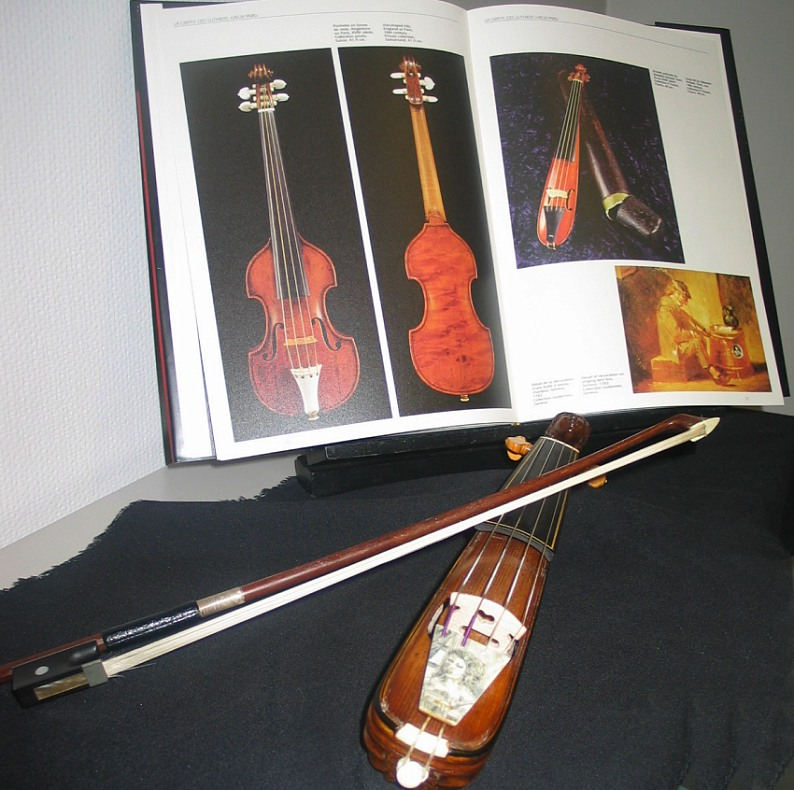
Pochettes

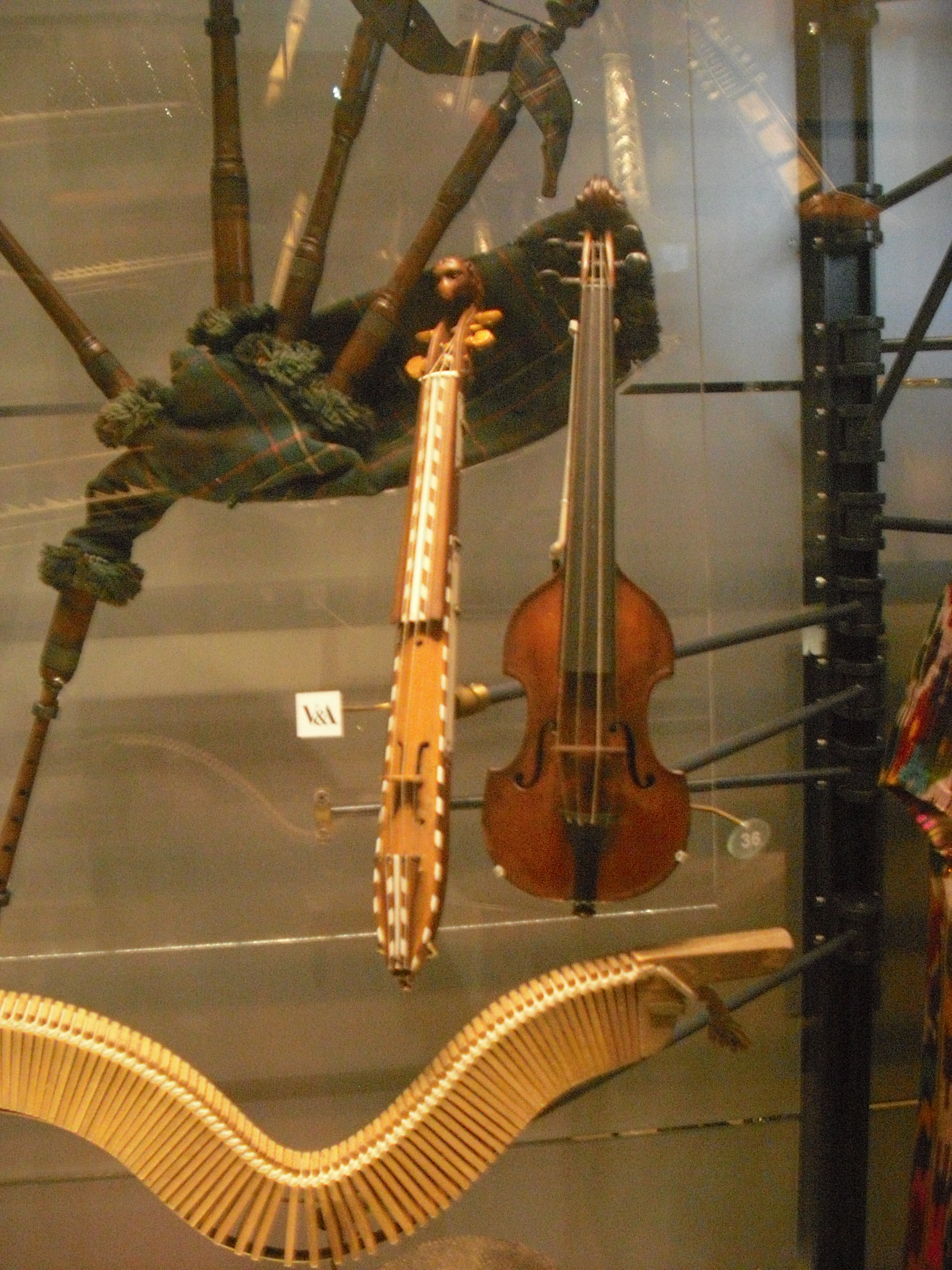
Two pochettes (the one on the left being a sardino and the one on the right a kit) in the Horniman Museum, London, UK.

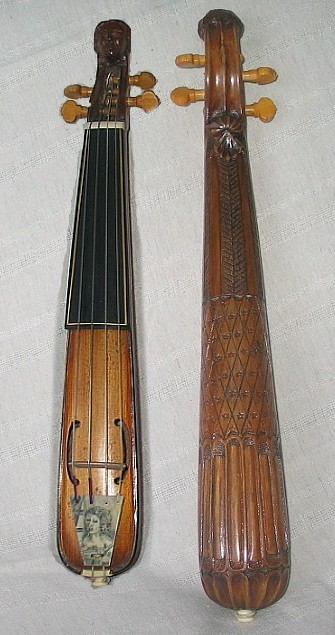
Two so called "pear shaped" pochettes

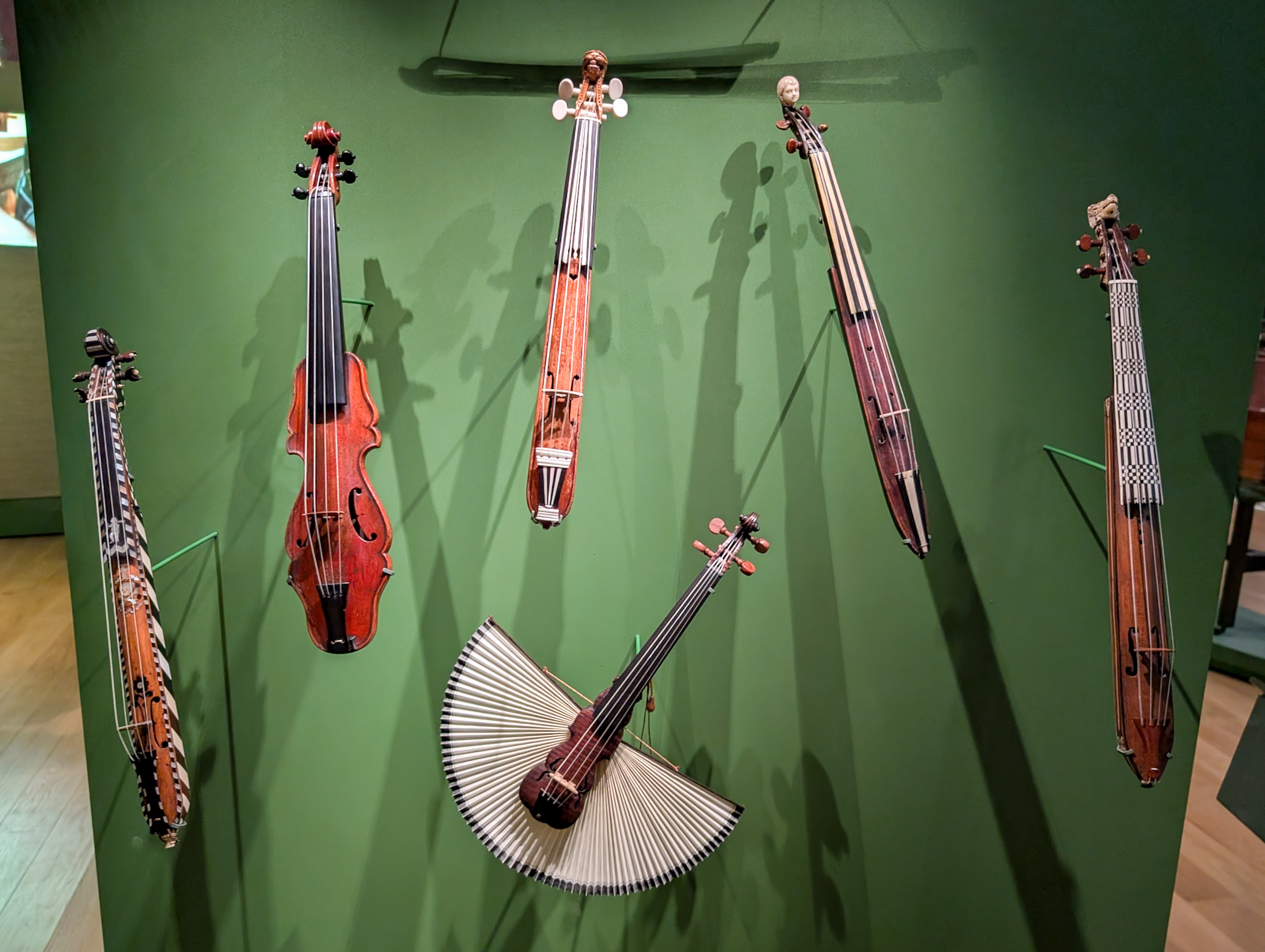
Pochettes including one incorporating a fan, at the Royal College of Music Museum, London

== See also ==
- Fiddle
- Violino piccolo
- Lute
- Kemenche
