= Violin family =

Class of wooden bowed stringed instruments

The violin family of musical instruments was developed in Italy in the 16th century. At the time, the name of this family of instruments was viole da braccio (viola da braccio in singular), which was used to distinguish them from the viol family or viole da gamba (viola da gamba in singular). The standard modern violin family consists of the violin, viola, cello, and (possibly) double bass.

Instrument names in the violin family are all derived from the root viola, which is a derivative of the Medieval Latin word vitula (meaning "stringed instrument"). A violin is a "little viola", a violone is a "big viola" or a bass violin, and a violoncello (often abbreviated cello) is a "small violone" (or literally, a "small big viola"). (The violone is not part of the modern violin family; its place is taken by the modern double bass, an instrument with a mix of violin and viol characteristics.)

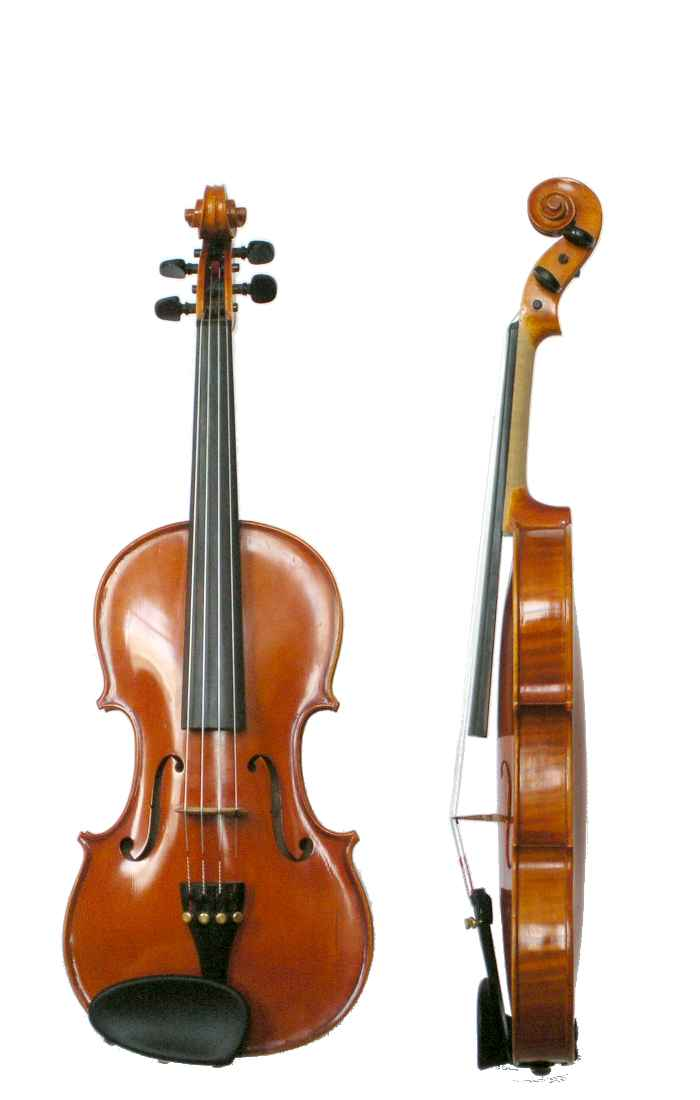
Violin

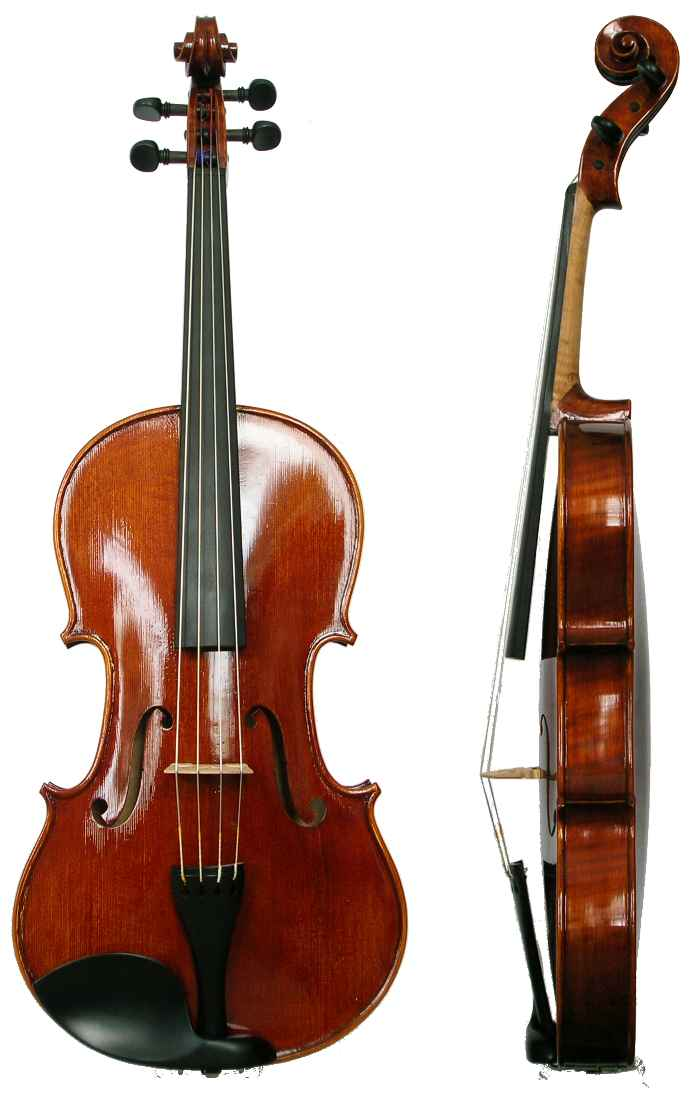
Viola

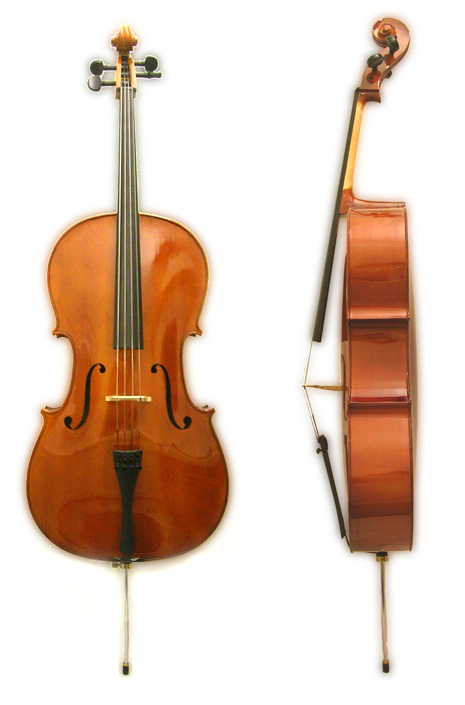
Cello

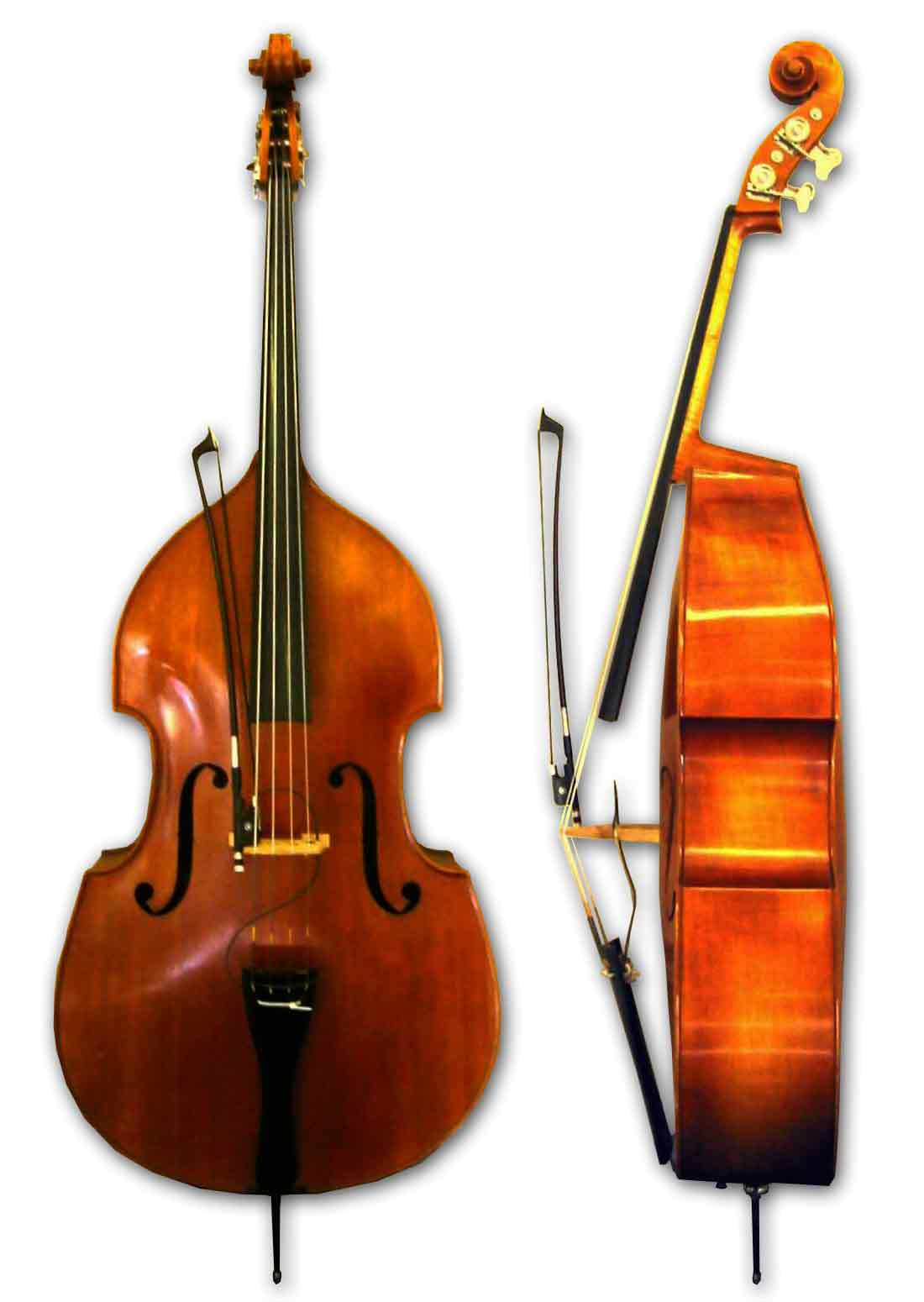
Double bass

== Background ==
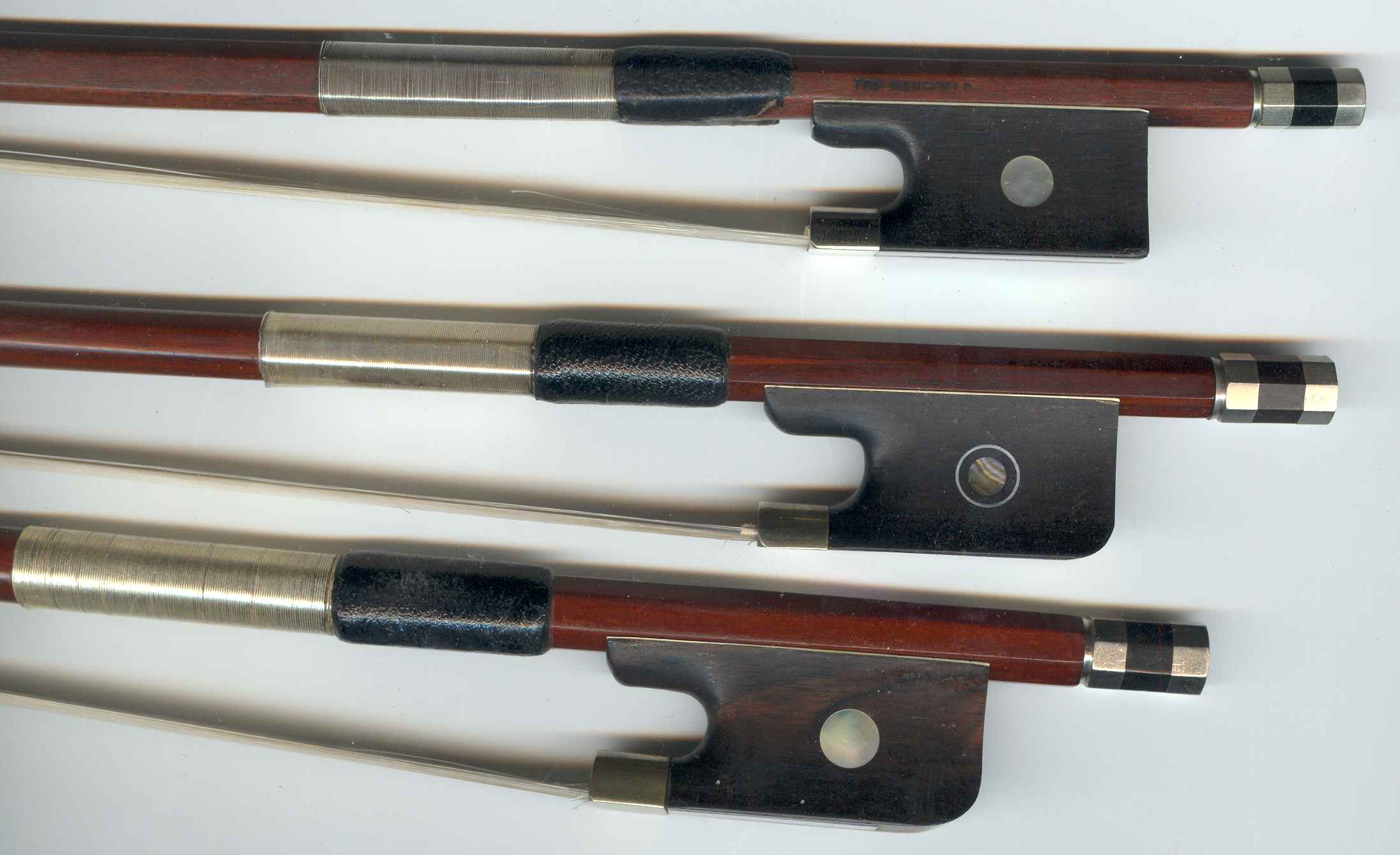
Violin, viola, and cello bow frogs (top to bottom)

The instruments of the violin family may be descended in part from the lira da braccio and the medieval Byzantine lira.

While the cello (which developed from the bass violin), the viola and the violin are indisputable members of the ancestral violin or viola da braccio family, the double bass's origins are sometimes called into question. The double bass is sometimes taken to be part of the viol family, due to its sloping shoulders, its tuning, the practice of some basses being made with more than four strings and its sometimes flat back. Others point out that correlation does not imply causation and say that these external similarities are either arbitrary or that they arose from causes other than a relationship to the viol family. They point to the internal construction of the double bass, which includes a sound post and bass bar like other violin family instruments as a more weighty piece of evidence than the external features. Its origins aside, it has historically been used as the lowest member of the violin family.

All string instruments share similar form, parts, construction and function, and the viols bear a particularly close resemblance to the violin family. However, instruments in the violin family are set apart from viols by similarities in shape, tuning practice and history. Violin family instruments have four strings each, are tuned in fifths (except the double bass, which is tuned in fourths), are not fretted and have four rounded bouts while always having a sound post and bass bar inside. In contrast, the viol family instruments usually have five to six strings with a fretted fingerboard, are tuned in fourths and thirds, often have sloping shoulders, and do not necessarily have a sound post or bass bar.

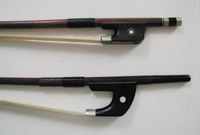
French (top) and German (bottom) double bass bows

== Characteristics ==
The playing ranges of the instruments in the violin family overlap each other, but the tone quality and physical size of each distinguishes them from one another. The ranges are as follows: violin: G_{3} to E_{7} (practical, notes up to A7 are possible); viola: C_{3} to A_{6} (conservative); violoncello: C_{2} to A_{5} (conservative); and double-bass: E_{1} to C_{5} (slightly expanded from conservative estimate). The double bass is often equipped with a mechanical extension or a fifth string that increases its lower range to either C_{1} or B_{0}, respectively.

Both the violin and viola are played under the jaw. The viola, being the larger of the two instruments, has a playing range that reaches a perfect fifth below the violin's. The cello is played sitting down with the instrument between the knees, and its playing range reaches an octave below the viola's. The double bass is played standing or sitting on a stool, with a range that typically reaches a minor sixth, an octave or a ninth below the cello's.

The top of the instrument, crafted from spruce, is thinner at the edges than the center. Similarly of a variable thickness, the back is most commonly crafted from maple (poplar and willow were used for some baroque instruments). The neck, bridge and ribs are maple, while the nut is often ebony.

== Uses ==
The instruments of the violin family are the most used bowed string instruments in the world today. Although all share a place in classical music, they are also used to a lesser degree in jazz, electronic music, rock, and other types of popular music, where they are often amplified, or simply created to be used as electric instruments. The violin is also used extensively in fiddle music, country music, and folk music. The double bass plays an indispensable part in both classical and jazz music forms.

One of the most popular and standardized groupings in classical chamber music, the string quartet, is composed entirely of instruments from the violin family: two violins, one viola and one cello. This similarity in the manner of sound production allows string quartets to blend their tone colour and timbre more easily than less homogeneous groups. This is particularly notable in comparison to the standard wind quintet, which, although composed entirely of wind instruments, includes four fundamentally different ways of producing musical pitch.

== Octobass ==
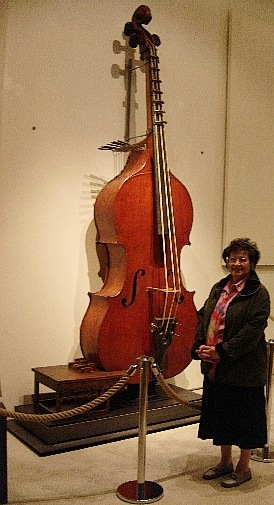
An octobass

The octobass, a larger version of the double bass, is a rarely used member of this family constructed in the 19th century. It is extremely unwieldy to play and thus has not found much acceptance; nevertheless, it can be found in some Romantic-era scores and is called for occasionally in modern works. The octobass is played standing, using a system of levers to fret the strings, as the positions are out of reach of the player. Its range typically reaches an octave below the double bass.

== See also ==
- Violin octet, an experiment in part to create an even more homogeneous blend of instruments related to the violin.
- Kit violin
- Tenor violin
- String instrument
- String orchestra
- List of string instruments
- Viol
