= Tenor violin =

Musical Instrument

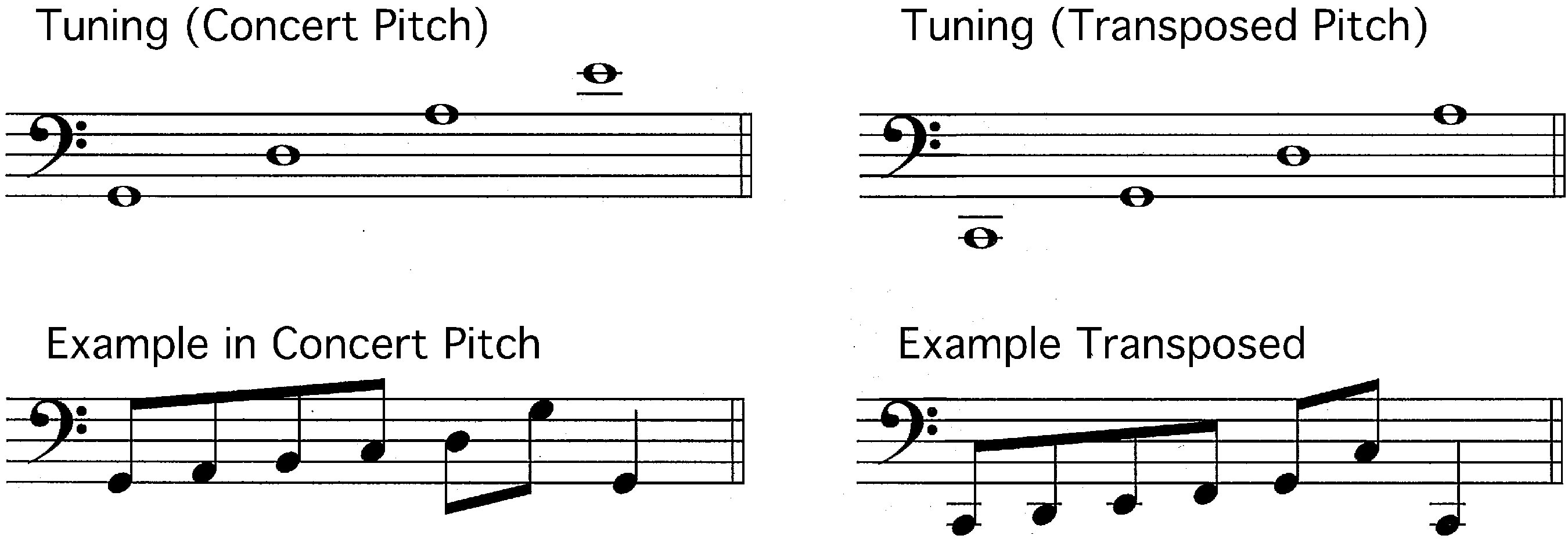
- Classification: Bowed string instruments

Related instruments
- Violin; Viola; Cello; Double bass

A tenor violin (or tenor viola) is a medium pitched bowed instrument with a range between those of the cello and the viola. An earlier development of the evolution of the violin family of instruments, the instrument is not standard in the modern symphony orchestra. Its tuning, typically G_{2}-D_{3}-A_{3}-E_{4} (an octave below the regular violin) places the range between the cello and viola and thus is sometimes confused with the modern baritone violin which has the same tuning on the standard violin body.

== History ==
As a formal development, the 17th-century tenor violin existed as an instrument with a body larger than a viola but with a short neck. In earlier designs, the tenor was played upright in the musician's lap. Tenor violin parts were written in tenor clef. Antonio Stradivari constructed two different models of tenor violin, as well as tenor variations of violas. As with the violins of the period, many of these examples feature fretted fingerboard. The smaller 14-inch (36 cm) tenor violins were of an unusual wide bodied shape and fitted with a very short tail piece to increase the string length sufficiently, thereby dropping the pitch down by an octave. Sometimes no tailpiece was fitted at all but the strings attached to a brass plate fastened to the front ribs.

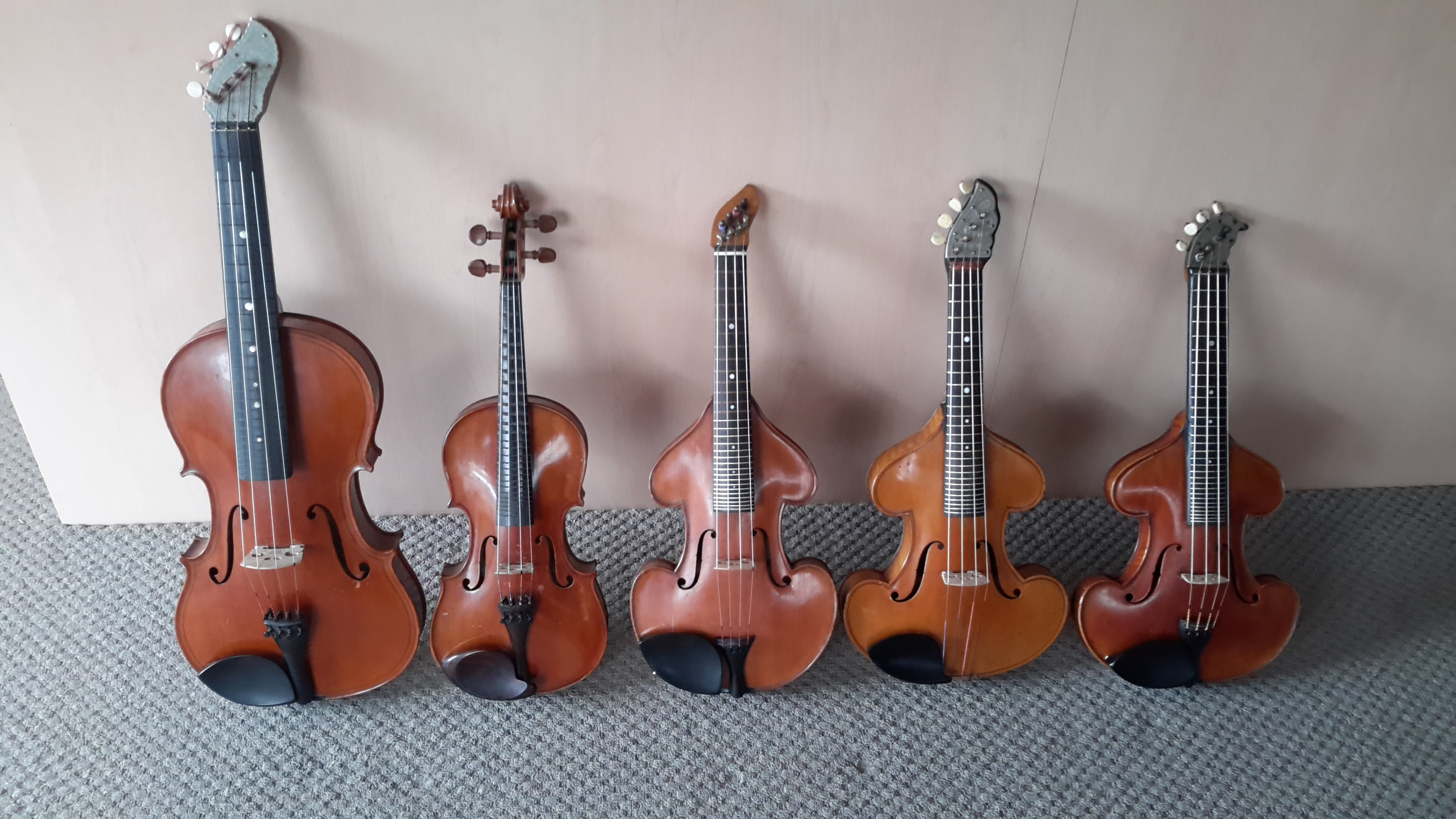
Four 120-year-old tenor violins with a full-size standard violin second from left for size reference.

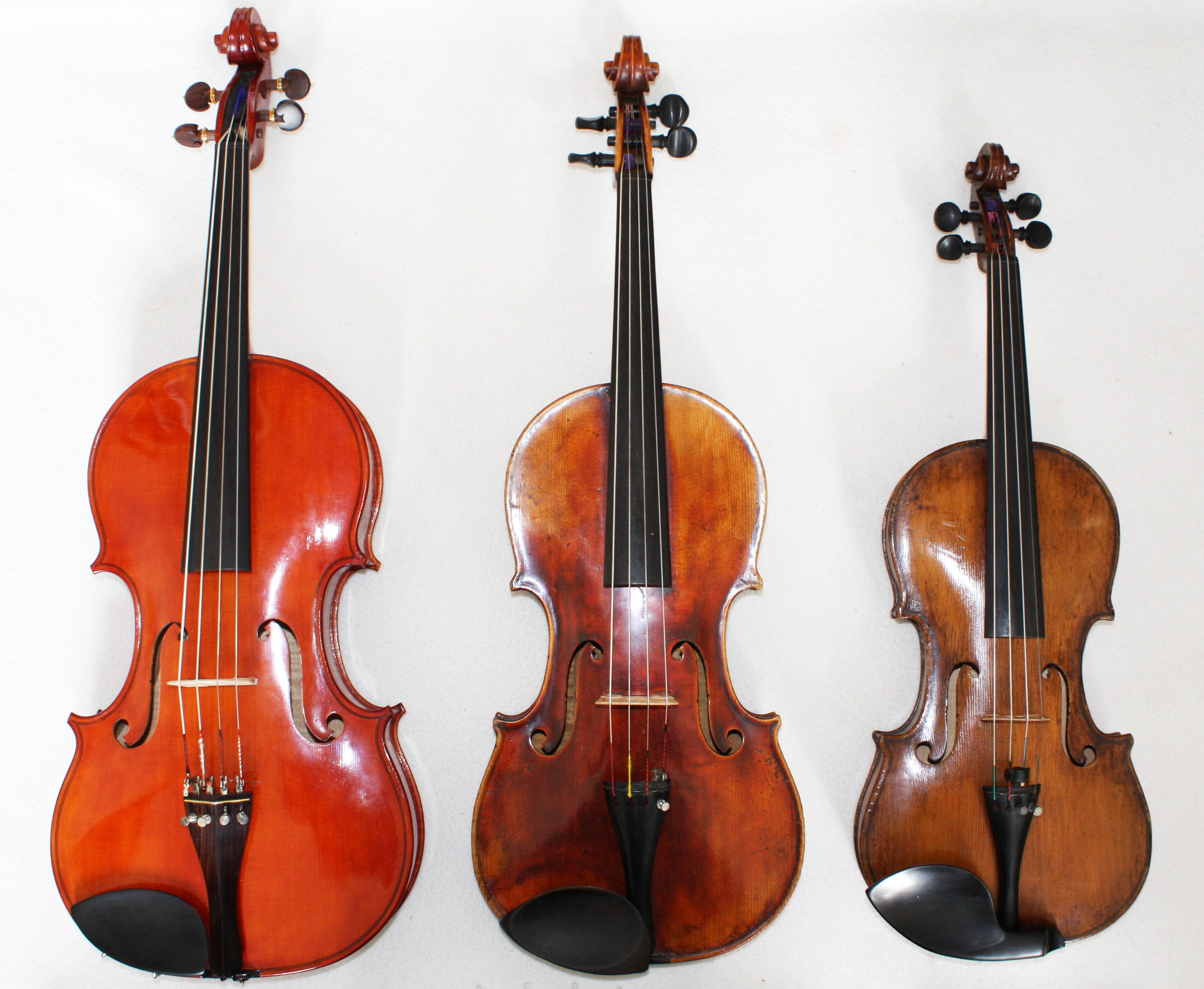
A modern tenor violin next to a standard viola and violin.

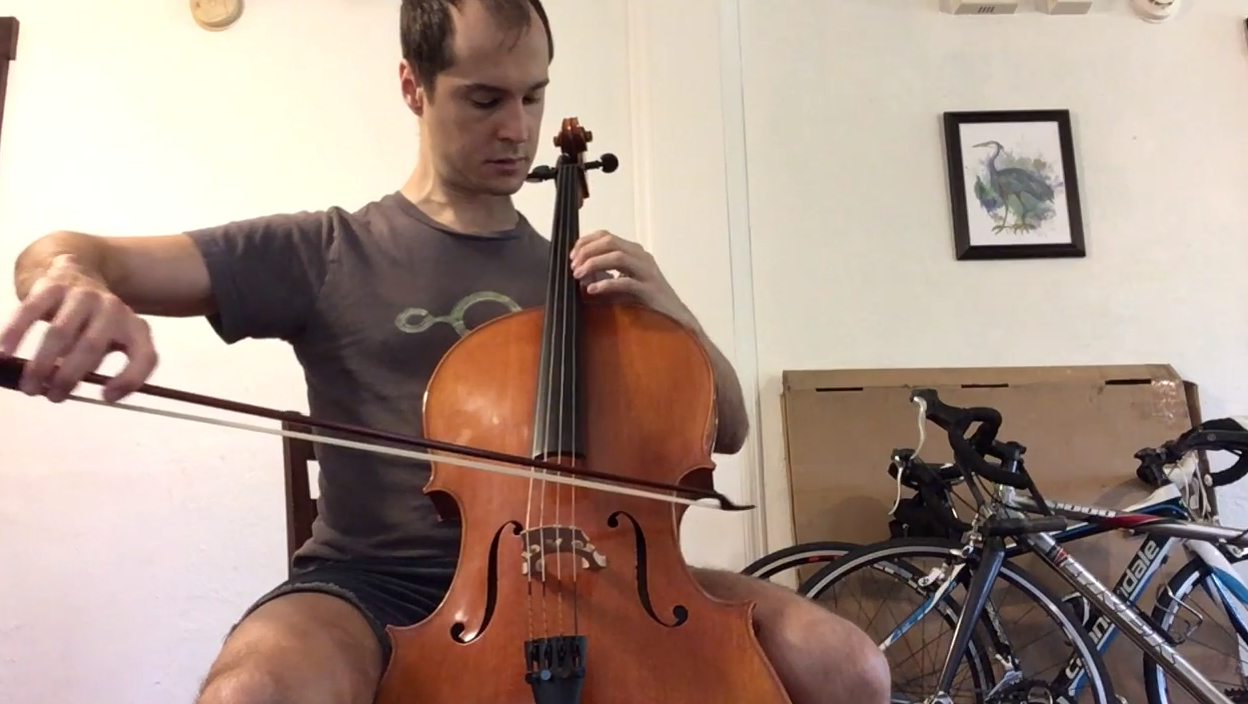
A man playing a tenor violin of the Violin octet family, in a sitting position.

Improvements in string technology in the 18th century led to greater focus of sound coming from the viola and cello ranges leading to a diminished role for tenor violins and violin makers constructed fewer of these instruments. Tenor violins regained popularity in Germany during the late 19th century to the early 20th century. They were meant to be played on the lap, but some were also fitted with chin rests for playing on the shoulder. The body is 18 inches (460 mm) long, while the instrument is 30 inches (760 mm) long overall, with the ribs being 1/8 inch (3.2 mm) higher than today's standard 16-inch (410 mm) viola.

By analogy with the vocal quartet of soprano-alto-tenor-bass, a few composers have featured the tenor violin as the voice between the alto of the viola and bass of the cello (e.g., Felix Draeseke or Sergei Taneyev). In contemporary musical improvisation these instruments are again finding a place.

Modern incarnations of the tenor violin include the violotta and viola profonda (both held at the shoulder). In the violin octet, the tenor violin exists as an instrument tuned an octave below the violin and approximately the same size as a 1/2-size cello; the baritone violin in the same is an enlarged version of the cello.

== Discography ==
- 1971 - Alberta Hurst, Tenor Violin, Plays: J. S. Bach, Arioso; Boccherini, Sonata in A-Major; Telemann, Trio-Sonata; Gal, Suite. With Konstanze Bender, recorder; Ruth Adams, bass viola da gamba; and Ralph Linsley, harpsichord. Crystal Records S735.

== Bibliography ==
- Kory, Agnes (1994). "A Wider Role for the Tenor Violin?". The Galpin Society Journal. 47 (Mar., 1994): 123–153. doi:10.2307/842665. JSTOR 842665.
- Segerman, Ephraim (1995). "The Name 'Tenor Violin". The Galpin Society Journal. 48 (Mar., 1995): 181–187. doi:10.2307/842810. JSTOR 842810.
